= List of Peruvian writers =

This is a list of Peruvian literary figures, including poets, novelists, children's writers, essayists, and scholars.

- Martín Adán (1908–1985), poet
- Katya Adaui (born 1977), novelist
- Daniel Alarcón (born 1977), novelist
- Ciro Alegría (1909–1967), indigenist novelist
- Marie Arana (born 1949), Peruvian-American novelist, biographer, journalist
- José María Arguedas (1911–1969), indigenist novelist and poet
- Federico Barreto (1862–1929), poet
- Jaime Bayly (born 1965), novelist
- Mario Bellatin (born 1960)
- Michael Bentine (1922–1996), Anglo-Peruvian comedian
- Alfredo Bryce Echenique (born 1939), novelist
- Guillermo Carnero Hoke (1917–1985), writer and journalist
- Carlos Castaneda (1925–1998), literary anthropologist
- Gamaliel Churata (1897–1969), socialist essayist and journalist
- Renato Cisneros (born 1976)
- Rafael Dumett (born 1963), playwright and novelist
- José María Eguren (1874–1942), poet
- Jorge Eduardo Eielson (1924–2006), poet
- Inca Garcilaso de la Vega (c. 1539–1616), the first mestizo chronicler
- Manuel González Prada (1844–1918), modernista poet
- Eduardo González Viaña (born 1941), short story writer and novelist
- Javier Heraud (1942–1963), poet and guerrillero
- Rodolfo Hinostroza (1941–2016), influential poet, writer, novelist and essayist
- Luis Jochamowitz (born 1953), journalist and biographer
- José Carlos Mariátegui (1894–1930), socialist essayist and journalist
- Gloria Macher Peruvian Canadian writer
- María Emma Mannarelli (born 1954), feminist writer, historian, professor
- Clorinda Matto de Turner (1853–1909), novelist
- Scarlett O'Phelan Godoy (born 1951), historian
- Angélica Palma (1878–1935), writer, journalist and biographer
- Clemente Palma (1872–1946), writer of fantastic and horror fiction
- Ricardo Palma (1833–1919), writer
- Manuela Villarán de Plasencia (1840–1888), writer and poet
- Felipe Guaman Poma de Ayala, indigenous chronicler
- Santiago Roncagliolo (born 1975), writer, scriptwriter, translator and journalist
- Julio Ramón Ribeyro (1929–1994), short story writer
- Isabel Sabogal (born 1958), novelist, poet and translator
- Sebastián Salazar Bondy (1924–1965), essayist and poet
- Claudia Salazar Jiménez (born 1976) writer, editor and academic
- José Santos Chocano (1875–1934), poet
- Manuel Scorza (1928–1983), novelist and poet
- Iván Thays (born 1968), writer
- Carlos Thorne Boas (1923–2021), novelist, writer and lawyer
- Álvaro Torres-Calderón (born 1975), poet
- Abraham Valdelomar (1888–1919)
- Blanca Varela (1926–2009), poet
- Mario Vargas Llosa (1936–2025), novelist of the Latin American Boom
- Virginia Vargas (born 1945), sociologist
- Cesar Vallejo (1892–1938), influential poet, writer, journalist
- José Watanabe (1946–2007), poet
- Carlos Yushimito (born 1977), writer
- Gunter Silva Passuni (born 1977), writer
- Esteban Pavletich Trujillo (1906–1981), poet, novelist, essayist

== See also ==
- List of Latin American writers
- List of Peruvian women writers
- Peruvian literature
