= List of Peruvian women writers =

This is a list of women writers who were born in Peru or whose writings are closely associated with that country.

== A ==
- Katya Adaui (born 1977), writer
- María Jesús Alvarado Rivera (1878–1971), novelist, playwright, journalist, women's rights activist
- Marie Arana (born 1949), Peruvian-American novelist, journalist

== B ==
- Monica Brown (author) (born 1969), children's book author, literature professor

== C ==
- Gianna Camacho, journalist
- Mercedes Cabello de Carbonera (1845–1909), novelist, essayist
- Aurora Cáceres (1877–1958), novelist, essayist, travel writer, biographer
- Clarinda (17th century), pen name of an anonymous poet, author of Discurso en loor de la poesía

== F ==
- Julia Ferrer (1925–1995), poet

== G ==
- Doris Gibson (1910–2008), journalist, magazine publisher
- Teresa González de Fanning (1836–1918), essayist, journalist, feminist writer, women's rights activist
- Juana Manuela Gorriti (1818–1892), Argentine-born Peruvian freedom fighter, novelist, short story writer, newspaper founder

== L ==
- Ana María Llona Málaga (born 1936), poet

== M ==
- María Emma Mannarelli (born 1954), feminist writer, historian, professor
- Manuela Antonia Márquez García-Saavedra (1844–1890), writer, poet, composer pianist
- Clorinda Matto de Turner (1852–1909), novelist, biographer, essayist, translator

== N ==
- María Nieves y Bustamante (1871–1947), novelist, short story writer

== O ==
- Scarlett O'Phelan Godoy (born 1951), historian and university professor

== P ==
- Angélica Palma (1878–1935), novelist, biographer, journalist

== S ==
- Isabel Sabogal (born 1958), novelist, poet, translator
- Claudia Salazar Jiménez (born 1976), writer, editor, academic

== V ==
- Ana Varela Tafur (born 1963), poet and educator
- Gisela Valcárcel (born 1963), television host, actress, autobiographer, magazine publisher
- Virginia Vargas (born 1945), sociologist
- Blanca Varela (1926–2009), widely translated poet
- Chalena Vásquez (1950–2016), ethnomusicologist

== W ==
- Julia Wong Kcomt (1965–2024), poet, novelist, short story writer

== See also ==
- List of Peruvian writers
- List of women writers
- List of Spanish-language authors
