= Felipillo =

16th-century Amerindian interpreter

"Felipillo" (or Felipe) was a 16th-century Amerindian interpreter who accompanied Spanish conquistadors Francisco Pizarro and Diego de Almagro on their various expeditions to Peru during their conquest of the Inca Empire. His real name is not known. Felipillo was the name given to him by the Spanish conquistadors.

== Biography ==
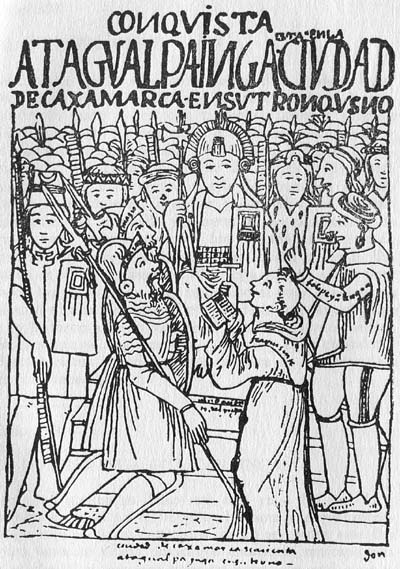
Felipillo, standing, to the right of Vicente de Valverde, dressed in a Spanish costume, according to a drawing by Guaman Poma de Ayala

There is discrepancy between Spanish contemporary sources about Felipillo's place of birth. According to some of them, he was a native of Tumbez, but according to others, he was born in the region of Poechos, and was of Tallán ethnicity. An isolated version claims he was from the island of Puná. Felipillo learned Quechua in Tumbes from natives who spoke it as a second language, and he also learned some Spanish from Pizarro's soldiers. He was later taken back to Panama by Pizarro.

On his return to Peru, Felipillo continued serving as a translator for the Spaniards as the conquest of the country carried its course After Pizarro captured the Inca ruler Atahualpa during the Battle of Cajamarca in 1532, Felipillo served as the main translator for Pizarro and Atahualpa during their first meeting. While chroniclers and early historians agree that the interpretation provided by Felipillo was far from faithful or even helpful for either Spaniards or Incas, they disagree on why this was the case. Most point to Felipillo's limited understanding of Quechua and Spanish. Inca Garcilaso de la Vega, for example, asserts that Felipillo's understanding of the languages was not advanced enough to provide a translation more complex than that of a parrot. Conquistador and chronicler Pedro Cieza de León, however, claims that Felipillo deliberately translated Pizarro's messages inaccurately to the Inca king and spread rumors because he belonged to a rival tribe and was having an affair with one of Atahualpa's concubines. ^{: 200, 211, 252-256}

Cieza de León also accuses Felipillo of later betraying Almagro during his expedition to Quito. In another incident, Felipillo betrayed Almagro again during his expedition to Chile by secretly telling the local natives to attack the Spaniards since they only wanted their gold and urged them to attack them or run away. Some accounts say that when Almagro discovered Felipillo's treacherous motives and his confession about purposely misinterpreting Pizarro's message to Atahualpa, he ordered his soldiers to capture Felipillo and tear his body apart with horses in front of the region's kuraka.

== Legacy ==
Contemporary historians have argued over Felipillo's actions and presence during the initial meeting between Sapa Inca Atahualpa and Fernando Pizzaro outside of Cajamarca. According to some, Felipillo may not have been the main interpreter during that meeting but rather another interpreter called Martinillo. Others argue that the interpreter had been Friar Vincente de Valverde.

Among Peruvians today, the word "Felipillo" has taken a meaning similar to "traitor." This depiction of Felipillo mostly originates from his actions during Pizarro's expeditions in 1532-1533, when he played a major role in the Sapa Inca's capture and trial.

Felipillo is a significant side character in Rafael Dumett's novel, El espía del Inca. This novel was published in 2018 by Lluvia Editores in Peru and later by Alfaguara in Spain. In the novel, Felipillo assists the Spanish invaders against the Incas.

== See also ==
- La Malinche
- Cuxirimay Ocllo
