= Beings: Contemporary Peruvian Short Stories =

- First edition
- Author: Various authors; edited by Elisa Cairati
- Translator: Anna Heath
- Language: English
- Genre: Peruvian literature, neorealism
- Publisher: Berforts Press
- Publication date: 2014
- Media type: Print
- Pages: 256
- ISBN: 9781908616739

Beings: Contemporary Peruvian Short Stories is an anthology that collects eight short stories of Peruvian neorealistic literature from 1960 to 2014. It was edited and introduced in 2014 by Elisa Cairati of the University of Milan and translated into English by Anna Heath. The anthology contains the following stories:

1. Julio Ramón Ribeyro, Alienation
2. Luis Loayza, Cold Afternoons
3. Fernando Ampuero, Bad Manners
4. Jorge Eduardo Benavides, It Doesn't Have to Be This Way
5. Guillermo Niño de Guzmán, No More Than A Shadow
6. Alonso Cueto, The Love Artist
7. Gunter Silva Passuni, Homesick
8. Ricardo Sumalavia, The Offering

César Ferreira describes the anthology as "a welcome and timely contribution that makes available some of the best short fiction to come out of Peru in recent decades".

== Bibliography ==
- BEINGS: Contemporary Peruvian Short Stories (anthology), London, Berforts Press, 2014. ISBN 9781908616739
