= José María Eguren =

Peruvian writer

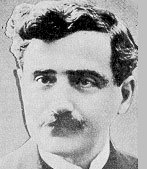
- Born: José María Eguren Rodríguez; July 7, 1874; Lima, Peru
- Died: April 19, 1942 (aged 67); Lima, Peru
- Writing career
- Movement: Postmodernism

José María Eguren Rodríguez (July 7, 1874, Lima – April 19, 1942, Lima) was a Peruvian writer. Although principally known for his poetry, Eguren was also a journalist, painter, photographer and an inventor.

Very much a post-modernist writer, notable works include Simbólicas (1911) and La canción de las figuras (1916).

== Biography ==
Eguren was born in Lima on July 7, 1874. His parents were Eulalia Rodríguez Hercelles and José María Eguren y Cáceda, who had him baptized on the same day of his birth in the San Sebastián parish. Due to health problems, he was weak and sickly since he was little. As a kid and teenager, he would spend much of his time out in the fields, such as the ranches of Chuquitanta and Pro, which his father managed, and where his family fled to in order to escape the wreckage caused by the War of the Pacific, and above all, the Occupation of Lima. It is possible that these experiences provided him with a closeness to nature that refined his senses, which was later reflected in his poetry. In his youth, Eguren belatedly began to attend school, starting his studies in 1884 at the age of ten in the Colegio de la Inmaculada run by Jesuits, and then in the Scientific Institute of Lima. A while later, he abandoned his conventional studies and instead took to teaching himself, with the help of his older brother and mentor Jorge.

In 1897, after the death of both his parents and the splitting up of his family, he moved to the district of Barranco with his older sisters Susan and Angelica (who remained single for the rest of their lives), with whom he would continue to live for the rest of his life. Barranco was a serene seaside town close to Lima, and Eguren resided there in peace and tranquility for more than thirty years, where his friends and apprentices such as fellow poets Martín Adán and Emilio Adolfo Westphalen would come to visit.

For persisting health reasons, Eguren compensated for his lack of formal education by reading extensively, at first, the works of romantic and modernist writers and poets like Julio Herrera y Reissig, and later on, the works of European decadent and symbolist poets, primarily French ones, like Baudelaire, Verlaine, Mallarmé, but also D'Annunzio and Edgar Allan Poe. He also read children's literature (Brothers Grimm, Andersen), and works from the masters of Preraphaelism and English Aestheticism (Ruskin, Rossetti, Wilde). Each of these writers left some sort of impression on Eguren, but a well-absorbed and very personal one nonetheless, that influenced his creativity and aesthetic beliefs.

Eguren died on April 19, 1942, at the age of 67.

== Features of symbolism ==
José María Eguren is a great representative of symbolism in Peru.

- Musicality: The words are worth more for their noise level, which by its semantic content.
- The suggestion: The word must denote not only connote.
- The exoticism
- The adoption of free verse
- The poetic symbol

== See also ==
- List of Peruvian writers
