= Sebastina: The Curse =

- Theatrical release poster
- Directed by: Augusto Tamayo San Román
- Screenplay by: Augusto Tamayo San Román
- Based on: Mujer y Tigre by Ricardo Palma
- Produced by: Augusto Tamayo San Román; Nathalie Hendrickx
- Starring: Silvana Cañote; Luciana Blomberg; Alicia Mercado; Andrea Luna; Paola Nanino
- Cinematography: Juan Durán
- Edited by: Marisabel Ato; Augusto Tamayo San Román
- Music by: Miguel Figueroa
- Production company: Argos Producciones Audiovisuales
- Release date: October 24, 2019
- Running time: 105 minutes
- Country: Peru
- Language: Spanish

Sebastina: The Curse (Spanish: Sebastiana: La maldición) is a 2019 Peruvian supernatural horror film written, co-produced, co-edited and directed by Augusto Tamayo San Román. Based on the short story Mujer y Tigre from Ricardo Palma's Peruvian Traditions. The cast is made up of Silvana Cañote, Luciana Blomberg, Alicia Mercado, Andrea Luna, Paola Nanino, André Silva, Stefano Salvini, Diego Carlos Seyfarth, Gianfranco Brero and Bertha Pancorvo.

== Synopsis ==
Nani is a 20-year-old who, along with her group of friends, visits the old house to investigate Sebastiana (Sebastina) and the tragic story surrounding her death in the 17th century.

== Cast ==
The actors participating in this film are:

- Silvana Cañote as Nani
- Luciana Blomberg as Mafe
- Alicia Mercado as Gianni
- Andrea Luna as Paula
- Paola Nanino as Anto
- André Silva as Javier Cortabrazos
- Stefano Salvini as Carlos
- Diego Carlos Seyfarth as Ricardo
- Gianfranco Brero as Nani's uncle
- Bertha Pancorvo as Teacher
- Valentina Saba as Sebastiana (Sebastina)
- Katerina D'Onofrio as Nani's mom
- Germán Gonzales as Cortabrazos Padre
- Lula Toledo as Nana

== Production ==
Principal photography lasted 4 weeks in Lima and Huarochirí with locations in San Juan Grande, Santiago de Surco, Cocachacra, Instituto Riva Agüero, and the University of Lima.

== Release ==
Sebastina: The Curse premiered on October 24, 2019, in Peruvian theaters.
