= Tafur =

Tafur is a surname. Notable people with the surname include:

- Ana Varela Tafur (born 1963), Peruvian poet
- Gabriela Tafur (born 1995), Colombian lawyer, model, and beauty pageant titleholder
- Martín Yañéz Tafur, Spanish conquistador
- Pedro Tafur (c. 1410 – c. 1484[1]), Castilian traveller, historian, and writer
- Yarol Tafur (2001–2023), Ecuadorian footballer

== See also ==
- Tafurs, Christian participants of the First Crusade
