= Virginia Guzmán Barcos =

Chilean academic

- Born: Virginia Beatriz Guzmán Barcos; 1943 (age 81–82); Santiago, Chile
- Occupation: Academic

Virginia Guzmán Barcos (born 1943) is a Chilean psychologist and sociologist, who was a co-founder of the Flora Tristán Peruvian Women's Center. After completing studies at the Pontifical Catholic University of Chile and École pratique des hautes études (School of Higher Education Practices) at the Sorbonne, she went into exile in Peru because of the military dictatorship in Chile. Continuing her studies, she earned a master's degree in Peru and a PhD in Spain. From 1978, she became interested in women's studies and began researching in the area of women and public policy. After twenty years working at the Flora Tristán Peruvian Women's Center, she returned to Chile. Since 2002, she has been the deputy director of the Centro de Estudios de la Mujer (Center of Women's Studies) in Santiago.

== Early life and education ==
Virginia Beatriz Guzmán Barcos was born in 1943 in Chile. Raised in a household of women, except for her father, she was encouraged to engage in activities usually reserved for men. Exposed to the writing of Simone de Beauvoir at fifteen, she chose to ignore the stereotypical paths open to women in her era. She began to join student organizations and advocate for civil and political rights. She graduated in 1968 from the Pontifical Catholic University of Chile and went on to study psychology, earning a Diplôme d'Etat d'assistant de service social (State diploma of social service assistant) certificate from the École pratique des hautes études (School of Higher Education Practices) at the Sorbonne in Paris in 1970. During her studies, she took note of the lack of women as subject matter in any field except the social sciences, which made her want to research women's roles.

== Career ==
During the military dictatorship in Chile, Guzmán went into exile in Lima, Peru. In 1978, while a student at the Pontifical Catholic University of Peru, she attended the Workshop on women's studies organized by the International Institute of Social Studies of The Hague, through the Peruvian National Institute of Culture. The course, taught by Virginia Vargas, included students like Guzmán, Roxana Carrillo, Concepción Dumois, Narda Henríquez, Magdalena León de Leal, and others. The following year, along with Vargas and others, she founded the Flora Tristán Peruvian Women's Center. The center gave scholars the opportunity to conduct research on women and published their works.

In 1992, Guzmán became affiliated with the Centro de Estudios de la Mujer (CEM, Women's Studies Center) in Santiago, but continued her studies, earning a master's degree from the Pontifical Catholic University of Peru in 1996. She became a professor in the social sciences department at the University of Chile in 1997, but after one year began to teach gender studies at the Academy of Christian Humanism University. Since 2002, she has served as the Subdirector of the CEM. She completed her PhD in sociology from the Autonomous University of Barcelona in 2011, with a thesis, Procesos politico – institucionales e igualidad de genero, Chile 1980–2010 (Political-Institutional Processes and Gender Equality, Chile 1980–2010).

In addition to her teaching, Guzmán has been involved in policy development at both the national and international levels. She helped in the planning process for the 1995 Beijing Conference on Women and has worked with various divisions of the United Nations and feminist organizations in developing and analyzing gender policies in Brazil, Chile, the Dominican Republic, Guatemala, Mexico, Nicaragua, Panama, Paraguay, Uruguay, and Venezuela. She served on the constitutional committee as a gender policy advisor to the second administration of President Michelle Bachelet.

== Research ==
Most of Guzmán's works explore social movements and how women can create institutions to change social processes. This often included an analysis of development areas, such as lack of education, poverty, issues of rural women, societal norms of subordination, violence, and others which were targeted by global initiatives and how effective cooperation between women in the Global North and Global South was at making women more visible and in solving socio-economic challenges. Throughout the 1980s, there had been little focus on issues such as family violence in Latin America, and works like Género en el desarrollo: una nueva lectura (Gender in Development: A New Reading, 1991) showed the depth of the problems.

Guzmán has researched how religion and politics are entwined and often take stances opposing sex education and reproductive rights, and how gender inequalities are often reinforced by public policies, in spite of state goals to democratize institutions and processes. In her study, "Reproducción y cambio de las desigualdades de género en contextos de transformaciones societales" ("Reproduction and Change in Inequalities of Gender in Contexts of Societal Transformations", 2018) with Lorena Godoy, Guzmán traced societal attitudes and changes in inequalities in socio-economic and political spheres in Chile over the forty-year period between 1970 and 2010.

== Selected works ==
- Guzmán, Virginia; Portocarrero, Patricia (1985). Dos veces mujer [Two Times Woman] (in Spanish). Lima, Peru: Centro de la Mujer Peruana Flora Tristán. OCLC 1025808684.
- Galer, Nora; Guzmán, Virginia; Portocarrero, Patricia; Ruiz Bravo, Patricia (1990). Mujer en el desarrollo: balance y propuestas [Women in Development: Balance and Proposals] (in Spanish). Lima, Peru: Centro de la Mujer Peruana Flora Tristán. OCLC 1025708779.
- Guzmán, Virginia; Portocarrero, Patricia; Vargas Valente, Virginia, eds. (1991). Género en el desarrollo: una nueva lectura [Gender in Development: A New Reading] (in Spanish) (1 ed.). Lima, Peru: Centro de la Mujer Peruana Flora Tristán. OCLC 807049906.
- Guzmán, Virginia; Lerba, Sandra; Salazar, Rebeca (1994). La dimensión de género en el quehacer del Estado [The Gender Dimension in the Work of the State] (in Spanish). Santiago, Chile: Centro de Estudios de la Mujer. OCLC 254574338.
- Guzmán, Virginia; Seibert, Ute; Staab, Silke (2010). "Democracy in the Country but not in the Home: Religion, Politics, and Women's Rights in Chile". Third World Quarterly. 31 (6). Taylor & Francis: 971–988. doi:10.1080/01436597.2010.502730. ISSN 0143-6597. OCLC 672937864.
- Guzmán Barcos, Virginia (2011). Procesos politico – institucionales e igualidad de genero, Chile 1980–2010 [Political-institutional processes and gender equality, Chile 1980–2010] (PhD) (in Spanish). Barcelona, Spain: Autonomous University of Barcelona.
- Guzmán Barcos, Virginia; Montaño Virreira, Sonia (2012). Políticas públicas e institucionalidad de género en América Latina (1985–2010) [Public Policies and Gender Institutions in Latin America (1985–2010)] (PDF) (Report). Mujer y Desarrollo: No. 118 (in Spanish). Santiago, Chile: CEPAL. ISSN 1564-4170. OCLC 931598203. Archived (PDF) from the original on 23 April 2023.
- Guzmán, Virginia; Godoy, Lorena (2018). "Reproducción y cambio de las desigualdades de género en contextos de transformaciones societales [Reproduction and Change in Inequalities of Gender in Contexts of Societal Transformations]". In Mora, Claudia; Kottow, Andrea; Osses, Valentina; Ceballos, Marco (eds.). El género furtivo: La evidencia interdisciplinar del género en el Chile actual [Furtive Gender: The Interdisciplinary Evidence of Gender in Present-Day Chile] (in Spanish). Santiago, Chile: LOM Ediciones. pp. 122–139. ISBN 978-956-00-1113-8.
- Guzmán Barcos, Virginia; Gerber Holanyszyn, Elisabet (2021). "Feminismos en Chile a la luz de la historia. Desde las raíces de la subordinación hacia la construcción de formas de vida más democráticas, humanas, y justas [Feminisms in Chile in the Light of History: From the Roots of Subordination towards the Construction of More Democratic, Humane, and Just Ways of Life]". In Bórquez Polloni, Blanca (ed.). Mujeres en tiempos de esperanza, crisis y pandemia [Women in Times of Hope, Crisis and Pandemic] (in Spanish) (Primeraición impresa ed.). Santiago, Chile: Biblioteca del Congreso Nacional de Chile. pp. 34–59. ISBN 978-956-7629-51-0.
