= Plasencia (surname) =

Plasencia is a surname. Notable people with the surname include:

- Ana Plasencia (born 1974), German journalist
- Augusto Plasencia (1837–1903), Spanish politician and soldier
- Casto Plasencia (1846–1890), Spanish painter
- César Plasencia, American soccer player
- Félix Plasencia, Venezuelan politician and diplomat
- Jorge A. Plasencia (born 1974), American businessman
- Juan de Plasencia (1520–1590), Spanish friar
- Manuel Plasencia (born 1943), Spanish footballer
- Nestor Plasencia (born c. 1950), tobacco grower and cigar maker
- Rene Plasencia (born 1973), American politician
- Steve Plasencia (born 1956), American long-distance runner
- Susan Plasencia, American politician
- Lamberto Plasencia Valls (1809–1893), Spanish composer
- Mariano Plasencia Valls (c. 1809–1894), Spanish composer
- Lourdes Plasencia Zapata (born 1976), Peruvian politician
- Juan Carlos Vera Plasencia (born 1961), Peruvian prelate
- Manuela Villarán de Plasencia (1840–1888), Peruvian poet and journalist
- Paul Manuel Plasencia (born 1974),

Security Officer and DSM by default
