= Province of Our Lady of Grace of Peru =

Catholic religious order in Peru

Order of Saint Augustine - Province of Our Lady of Grace of Peru - Orden de San Agustín Provincia de Nuestra Señora de Gracia del Perú
- Abbreviation: OSA
- Formation: June 1, 1551
- Type: Catholic religious order
- Provincial Prior: Alexander Lam Alania
- Key people: Augustine of Hippo

Coming from the Augustinian Mission of Mexico, the Priest Agustin de la Santísima Trinidad came to Peru with 12 Augustinians and created the Province of Peru, dedicated to the Mother of Grace.

In 1889, the Priest Eustasio Esteban came to Peru and refundated the Province, and this past to the Province of Spain. The Priest Ignacio Monasterio was the current Prior, founding the School of Saint Augustin in San Isidro.

In 2005 the Pronvice regained its independence of the Spanish Province of Santisimo Nombre de Jesús de Filipinas, when the Priest Miguel Diez was Prior.

Elected in 2007, the modern day Provincial Prior is Priest Alexander Lam Alania, O.S.A.

The Augustinians have schools and churches in Lima, Pacasmayo and Chiclayo.
