= Julio Ramón Ribeyro =

Peruvian writer

Julio Ramon Ribeyro Zúñiga (31 August 1929 – 4 December 1994) was a Peruvian writer best known for his short stories. He was also successful in other genres: novel, essay, theater, diary and aphorism. In the year of his death, he was awarded the US$100,000 Premio Juan Rulfo de literatura latinoamericana y del Caribe. His work has been translated into numerous languages, including English.

The characters in his stories, often autobiographical and usually written in simple but ironic language, tend to end up with their hopes cruelly dashed. But despite its apparent pessimism, Ribeyro's work is often comic, its humor springing from both the author's sense of irony and the accidents that befall his protagonists. A collection was published under the title La palabra del mudo (The Word of the Mute).

Ribeyro studied literature and law in Universidad Católica in Lima. In 1960 he immigrated to Paris where he worked as a journalist in France Presse and then as cultural advisor and ambassador to UNESCO. He was an avid smoker, as described in his short story ¨Sólo para fumadores¨ (For smokers only), and he died as a result of his addiction.

== Life and career ==
=== Early years (1929–1952) ===
Ribeyro was born in Lima on 31 August 1929. He was the son of Julio Ramón Ribeyro Bonello and Mercedes Zúñiga Rabines, the first of four children (two boys and two girls). His family was middle class, but in earlier generations had belonged to the upper class, counting among his ancestors some illustrious figures in Peruvian culture and politics, mostly of a conservative and "civilist" trend. In his childhood he lived in Santa Beatriz, a middle-class Lima neighborhood, and then moved to Miraflores, residing in the neighborhood of Santa Cruz, close to Huaca Pucllana. He went to school in the Champagnat School of Miraflores. He was deeply affected by the death of his father which also created a dire economic situation for his family.

Later, he studied Arts and Law at the Pontifical Catholic University of Peru, between 1946 and 1952, where he met Pablo Macera, Alberto Escobar and Luis Felipe Angell "Sofocleto" among other youth with intellectual and artistic interests. He began his writing career with the short story The Grey Life which was published in the magazine Correo Bolivariano in 1948. In 1952 he won a journalism fellowship awarded by the Institute of Hispanic Culture, which allowed him to travel to Spain.

=== First trip to Europe (1952–1958) ===
He traveled by ship to Barcelona and from there went to Madrid, where he spent a year and studied at the Complutense University in that city. He also wrote some short stories and articles.

By the end of his fellowship in 1953, he traveled to Paris to prepare a thesis on French literature at the Sorbonne University. By then he had written his first book Los gallinazos sin plumas (The featherless buzzards), a collection of short stories on urban issues, regarded as one of his most successful pieces of narrative writing. There, he decided to drop out and remained in Europe doing odd jobs, alternating his stay in France with brief periods in Germany and Belgium. It was in Munich between 1954 and 1956, where he wrote his first novel, Chronicle of San Gabriel. He returned to Paris and then traveled to Antwerp in 1957, where he worked in a factory of photography products. In 1958, he returned to Germany and spent some time in Berlin, Hamburg and Frankfurt. During his European stay he had to take on many trades to survive, including those of newspapers recycling, concierge, loader on the subway, seller of printing materials, among others.

He returned to Lima in 1958. He was appointed as a professor at the National University of San Cristobal de Huamanga in Ayacucho, and instigated the creation of the Institute for Popular Culture, in 1959. In 1960 he published his novel Chronicle of San Gabriel, which earned him the National Novel Prize that year.

=== Second trip to Europe (1961) ===
In 1961, he returned to Paris, where he worked as a journalist for ten years, Agence France Press. He was also cultural attache at the Peruvian Embassy in Paris, and was also a cultural consultant and ambassador of Peru to UNESCO.

He married Alida Cordero and they had one child. In 1973, underwent his first operation for lung cancer, caused by his addiction to cigarettes, as a result of which he received a long treatment. Inspired by this experience, he wrote a book entitled Only For Smokers.

In 1983, he received the National Book Award, and ten years later, the National Culture.

=== Final years ===
Generous with his friends and with young writers, Ribeyro never had enemies and was always very appreciated by his contemporaries. After being confirmed as ambassador to Unesco in the late 1980s, he had a very rough verbal exchange with fellow Peruvian and friend Mario Vargas Llosa, regarding the political debate in Peru around the proposed nationalization of banks by the first presidential term of Alan García government, which divided public opinion in the country. Ribeyro criticized Vargas Llosa for supporting the conservative sectors of the country, which according to him meant he was opposing the emergence of the popular classes. Vargas Llosa answered in his memoir A Fish in the Water (1993), by pointing out what he considered Ribeyro's lack of consistency, which made him appear subservient to every single government so as to maintain his diplomatic appointment in Unesco. However, apart from this embarrassing episode, Vargas Llosa has consistently praised the literary work of Ribeyro, whom he considers as one of the great storytellers in Spanish. The relationship between the two authors, who shared a flat in Paris, was otherwise complex and full of mysteries.

His last years were spent traveling between Europe and Peru. In the last year of his life he had decided to remain definitely in his homeland in Peru. He died on 4 December 1994, days after getting the Juan Rulfo Prize for Literature.

In 2019, to celebrate the 90th anniversary of Julio Ramón Ribeyro's birth, the literary magazine of the University of Oklahoma published a dossier titled Julio Ramón Ribeyro. The dossier includes texts by Peruvian writer Fernando Ampuero, the author's official biographer Jorge Coaguila, Dr. Paloma Torres, and Peruvian writer Gunter Silva Passuni.

== Bibliography ==
=== Short Books ===
- 1955: Los gallinazos sin plumas. Eight short stories: “Los gallinazos sin plumas”, “Interior «L»”, “Mar afuera”, “Mientras arde la vela”, “En la comisaría”, “La tela de araña”, “El primer paso” and “Junta de acreedores”.
- 1958: Cuentos de circunstancias. Twelve short stories: “La insignia”, “El banquete”, “Doblaje”, “El libro en blanco”, “La molicie”, “La botella de chicha”, “Explicaciones a un cabo de servicio”, “Página de un diario”, “Los eucaliptos”, “Scorpio”, “Los merengues” and “El tonel de aceite”.
- 1964: Las botellas y los hombres. Ten short stories: “Las botellas y los hombres”, “Los moribundos”, “La piel de un indio no cuesta caro”, “Por las azoteas”, “Dirección equivocada”, “El profesor suplente”, “El jefe”, “Una aventura nocturna”, “Vaquita echada” and “De color modesto”.
- 1964: Tres historias sublevantes. Three short stories: “Al pie del acantilado”, “El chaco” and “Fénix”.
- 1972: Los cautivos. Twelve short stories: “Te querré eternamente”, “Bárbara”, “La piedra que gira”, “Ridder y el pisapapeles”, “Los cautivos”, “Nada que hacer, monsieur Baruch”, “La estación del diablo amarillo”, “La primera nevada”, “Los españoles”, “Papeles pintados”, “Agua ramera”, “Las cosas andan mal” and “Carmelo Rosa”.
- 1972: El próximo mes me nivelo. Nine short stories: “Una medalla para Virginia”, “Un domingo cualquiera”, “Espumante en el sótano”, “Noche cálida y sin viento”, “Los predicadores”, “Los jacarandás”, “Sobre los modos de ganar la guerra”, “El próximo mes me nivelo” and “El ropero, los viejos y la muerte”.
- 1974...2010: La palabra del mudo. Short stories compilation. It has been published many times; the last one from the publisher Seix-Barral, in two volumes for Perú (2009) and one for Spain (2010), which besides all the compiled stories, includes six forgotten stories (“La vida gris”, “La huella”, “El cuarto sin numerar”, “La careta”, “La encrucijada” and “El caudillo”), three unknown stories (“Los huaqueros”, “El Abominable” and “Juegos en la infancia”) and an unpublished one (“Surf”).
- 1977: Silvio en El Rosedal. Fifteen: “Terra incognita”, “El polvo del saber”, “Tristes querellas en la vieja quinta”, “Cosas de machos”, “Almuerzo en el club”, “Alienación”, “La señorita Fabiola”, “El marqués y los gavilanes”, “Demetrio”, “Silvio en El Rosedal”, “Sobre las olas”, “El embarcadero de la esquina”, “Cuando no sea más que sombra”, “El carrusel” and “La juventud en la otra ribera”.
- 1987: Sólo para fumadores. Eight stories: “Solo para fumadores”, “Ausente por tiempo indefinido”, “Té literario”, “La solución”, “Escena de caza”, “Conversación en el parque”, “Nuit caprense cirius illuminata” and “La casa en la playa”.
- 1992: Relatos santacrucinos. Ten stories: “Mayo 1940”, “Cacos y canes”, “Las tres gracias”, “El señor Campana y su hija Perlita”, “El sargento Canchuca”, “Mariposas y cornetas”, “Atiguibas”, “La música, el maestro Berenson y un servidor”, “Tía Clementina” and “Los otros”.

=== Novel ===
- 1960: Crónica de San Gabriel. National Novel Prize in the same year.
- 1965: Los geniecillos dominicales. Novel Prize from the newspaper Expreso(Perú).
- 1976: Cambio de guardia.

=== Theatre ===
- 1975: Santiago, el Pajarero. Theater play based on Flying Santiago, character from Peruvian traditions (Ricardo Palma) from Ricardo Palma
- 1981: Atusparia

=== Other genres ===
- 1975: La caza sutil (Essays).
- 1975: Prosas apátridas (Unclassified).
- 1989: Dichos de Luder (Unclassified).
- 1992–1995: La tentación del fracaso (Journals).
- 1996–1998: Cartas a Juan Antonio (Correspondence).

== Awards ==
- Premio Nacional de Novela (1960)
- Premio de Novela del diario Expreso (1963)
- Premio Nacional de Literatura (1983)
- Premio Nacional de Cultura (1993)
- Premio Juan Rulfo de Literatura Latinoamericana (1994)

== See also ==
- Peruvian literature
- List of Peruvian writers
