= Serafina Quinteras =

Peruvian author and songwriter (1902–2004)

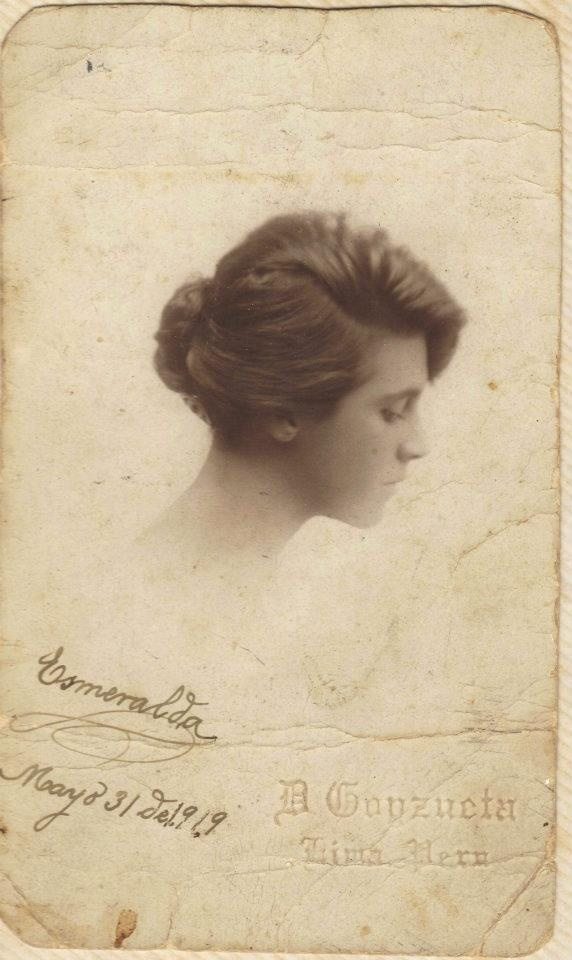
- A portrait of Serafina Quinteras
- Born: Esmeralda Gonzales Castro; August 1, 1902; Lima, Peru
- Died: May 13, 2004 (aged 101); Lima, Peru
- Years active: 1910–2002
- Notable work: "Muñeca Rota" and "Parlamanías"
- Relatives: Mother of - Blanca Varela

Esmeralda Gonzales Castro (1902–2004), better known as Serafina Quinteras, was a Peruvian songwriter, journalist, and poet. She is most famous for the composition of the vals "Muñeca Rota".

== Biography ==
Esmeralda was born on the 1st of August 1902. She was the daughter of the Ecuadorian poet, historian and diplomat Nicolás Augusto Gonzales Tola; her mother was the writer and poet Delia Castro Marquez Indice.

From an early age she took an interest in journalism and used multiple pseudonyms such as "Pancha Remolino and "Demetrio Rueda". Afterward she identified herself with the pseudonym "Serafina Quinteras" and used it for several decades in a collaboration with "El Comercio", a daily newspaper from Peru. She chose the name, because she admired the famous Spanish theater authors Serafin and Joaquin Alvarez Quintero.

Along with Esmeralda, her cousin Emma Castro Pervuli also assumed the pseudonym Joaquina Quinteras, and together they began a career in Peruvian Creole music by composing their first songs like "El Ermitaño", "Todo y Nada" and their largest success was the vals "Muñeca Rota" and "Parlamanías".

Her daughter, Blanca Varela, was also a notable poet.

== Awards and honors ==
Marking the second century of freedom in Peru, the Ministry of Culture made a tribute to Serafina Quinteras, alongside other authors on the 27th of September 2020.

She also received a golden medal for her contribution to music in 1996, given by the National Council of Women. She also received the Orden del Sol in the year 2000.
