= Flora Tristán Peruvian Women's Center =

Peruvian feminist non-governmental organization

- Centro de la Mujer Peruana Flora Tristán
- Named after: Flora Tristan
- Established: 1979; 47 years ago
- Type: NGO
- Field: Women's rights
- Executive director: Liz Meléndez
- Website: www.flora.org.pe

The Flora Tristán Peruvian Women's Center (Spanish: Centro de la Mujer Peruana Flora Tristán or CMP Flora Tristán) is a feminist non-governmental organization established in Lima in 1979 in defense of women's human rights and equality.

It has Consultative Status with the United Nations Economic and Social Council (ECOSOC).

The current executive director is sociologist Liz Meléndez.

== History ==
CMP Flora Tristán has been connected with the advancement of women's rights in Peru since its founding in 1979. It was named in honor of French-Peruvian socialist writer and activist Flora Tristan. Its founders include the feminist sociologists Virginia Guzmán Barcos, Narda Henríquez, and Virginia Vargas. The latter served as the organization's coordinator, and later as its director until 1990.

The cartoonist Marisa Godínez joined in 1980, before they established their first site at Quilca, to run publication and create visual elements for promotion for the organization.

The jurist Giulia Tamayo León was responsible for the legal assistance program for defense of victims of gender violence, including violence and sexual exploitation against minors. She was also the center's director from 1994 to 1996.

In 2004, on the occasion its 25th anniversary, the center organized the national seminar "25 Years of Feminism in Peru", analyzing the evolution of the feminist movement and creating a strategy for working to advance public policies.

== Objectives ==
The organization develops strategies for research, training, advice, communication, legal and health services, as well as the dissemination of information. It conducts specialized training, in addition to promoting and participating in the formulation and negotiation of public policies to advance women's rights.

Among the programs it has developed are the Feminist Studies and Debate Program, research on femicides in Peru – in which the organization was a pioneer – the prevention of violence against women, and the empowerment of women in economic and political spaces. It also promotes the campaign to prevent, punish and eradicate political harassment against women.

== International presence ==
- Consultative Status with the United Nations Economic and Social Council (ECOSOC)
- 28 September Campaign, Day for the Decriminalization of Abortion in Latin America and the Caribbean

== Awards and recognition ==
- 2021: Order Emeritus to the Women of the Bicentennial, awarded by the Peruvian government's Ministry of Women and Vulnerable Populations

== Notable people ==
- María Emma Mannarelli, feminist writer, historian, professor, researcher

== Selected publications ==
- Romero Bidegaray, Inés (September 2002). El aborto clandestino en el Perú [Clandestine Abortion in Peru] (PDF) (in Spanish). Lima. ISBN 9972610438.
- Cevasco, Gaby, ed. (December 2004). 25 años de feminismo en el perú: Historia, confluencias y perspectivas [25 Years of Feminism in Peru: History, Confluences, and Perspectives] (PDF) (in Spanish). Lima. ISBN 9972610675.
- Vargas, Virginia (2006). El movimiento feminista en el horizonte democrático peruano (décadas 1980–1990) [The Feminist Movement on the Peruvian Democratic Horizon (Decades 1980–1990)] (in Spanish). Centro de la Mujer Peruana Flora Tristán. ISBN 9789972610837.
- Zunic, Liliana, ed. (2006). Las mujeres positivas. La situación de las mujeres viviendo con VIH/Sida en el Perú [Positive Women: The Situation of Women Living With HIV/AIDS in Peru] (PDF) (in Spanish). Lima. ISBN 997261087X.
- Tristan, Flora (2007). El tour de Francia [The Tour of France] (in Spanish). Translated by Westphalen, Yolanda. Lima.
- Manual de Formación Política y Gestión Local con Equidad de Género [Manual of Political Training and Local Management With Gender Equity] (PDF) (in Spanish). Lima. February 2007. ISBN 9789972610936.
