= Colegio San Agustín (Lima) =

Location
- Av. Javier Prado-Este 980.San Isidro; Lima; Peru
- Coordinates: 12.0916°S 77.0207°W

Information
- Other name: Saint Augustine School
- Type: Private primary and secondary school
- Motto: Spanish: 110 Años Construyendo la Ciudad de Dios en el Mundo de los Hombres (110 Years Building the City of God in the World of Men)
- Religious affiliation: Catholicism
- Denomination: Order of Saint Augustine
- Patron saint: Augustine of Hippo
- Established: 15 May 1903; 122 years ago
- Grades: K-12
- Gender: Boys (1903-1992); Co-educational (since 1993)
- Enrollment: c. 2,200
- Language: Spanish; English
- Campus: Urban
- Colours: Red and yellow
- Mascot: Eagle
- Website: www.sanagustin.edu.pe

Colegio San Agustín is a private Catholic primary and secondary school, located in Lima, Peru. The school was founded in 1903 as part of the evangelizing mission of the Order of Saint Augustine by the Province of Our Lady of Grace of Peru.

== History ==
The school began operating on March 15, 1903, under the direction of Fr Ignacio Monasterio. Its first location was the Convent of Nuestra Señora de Gracia, commonly known as "St. Augustine" on Ica Street in downtown Lima. The initial teaching staff consisted of 8 clergymen and the student population was fifty-two (52).

The school ran a boarding school until 1920 with a capacity for about eighty (80) students.

The school remained in its original location for 52 years until 1955; that year, authorized by R. M. (Education Ministry Decree) No. 1369 of February 16, 1955, the school was moved to its current campus located at the intersection of Avenida Javier Prado and Paseo de la Republica, in the San Isidro district. On December 21, 1958, the solemn blessing and opening of the college chapel took place. At the same time the section dedicated to the early grades was opened, this area is currently occupied by the 3rd and 4th grades of primary school. In 1959 the School Library was inaugurated. In 1969 the Great Coliseum, which seats some 3000 spectators, was opened. Pre-kinder was reinstated in 1985, under the name 'Initial Education'. In 1978, during the celebration of its Diamond Jubilee, the school was inducted in the Ministry of Education's Honor Registry. In 1992, the school became co-educational; it had been an all-male school until then. Co-ed education started with the earliest grade in 1993; the first co-ed class graduated in 2004.

The school expansion has continued within the confines of the San Isidro campus, a brand new auditorium for 1148 spectators was opened on June 30, 2001, adding a new all-purpose venue to the city of Lima.

== Principals ==
1. M.R.P. Ignacio Monasterio E.
2. M.R.P. Casto Roza R.
3. M.R.P. Francisco Muñiz A.
4. M.R.P. José Maria Alvarez B.
5. M.R.P. Benito González G.
6. M.R.P. Graciano Montes F.
7. M.R.P. Isaac Pajares I.
8. M.R.P. José Robla B.
9. M.R.P. Senén Fernández B.
10. José Garcia P.
11. M.R.P. Ricardo de Canceco S.
12. José Garcia P.
13. Priest Jesús Delgado A.
14. M.R.P. Restituto Diez R.
15. M.R.P. Benito Mancebo M.
16. M.R.P. Honorato García G.
17. M.R.P. Arsenio Anibarro A.
18. M.R.P. Cesáreo Miguélez del R.
19. M.R.P. Juan Manuel Cuenca C.
20. M.R.P. Cesáreo Fernández de las Cuevas
21. M.R.P. José Souto Prado
22. M.R.P José Maria Verdejo Verdejo
23. M.R.P. Senén González M.
24. M.R.P. Elias Neira A.

== Notable alumni ==
- Jaime Bayly, writer, journalist and TV personality
- Sebastián Salazar Bondy, play writer, essayist, poet, journalist and intellectual
- Fernando Carbone, M.D. former Minister of Health
- Jaime Cuadra, actor
- Javier Pérez de Cuéllar, Secretary-General of the United Nations from January 1, 1982 to December 31, 1991

== See also ==
- Education in Peru
- Catholic Church in Peru
