= Fernando de Szyszlo =

Peruvian painter (1925–2017)

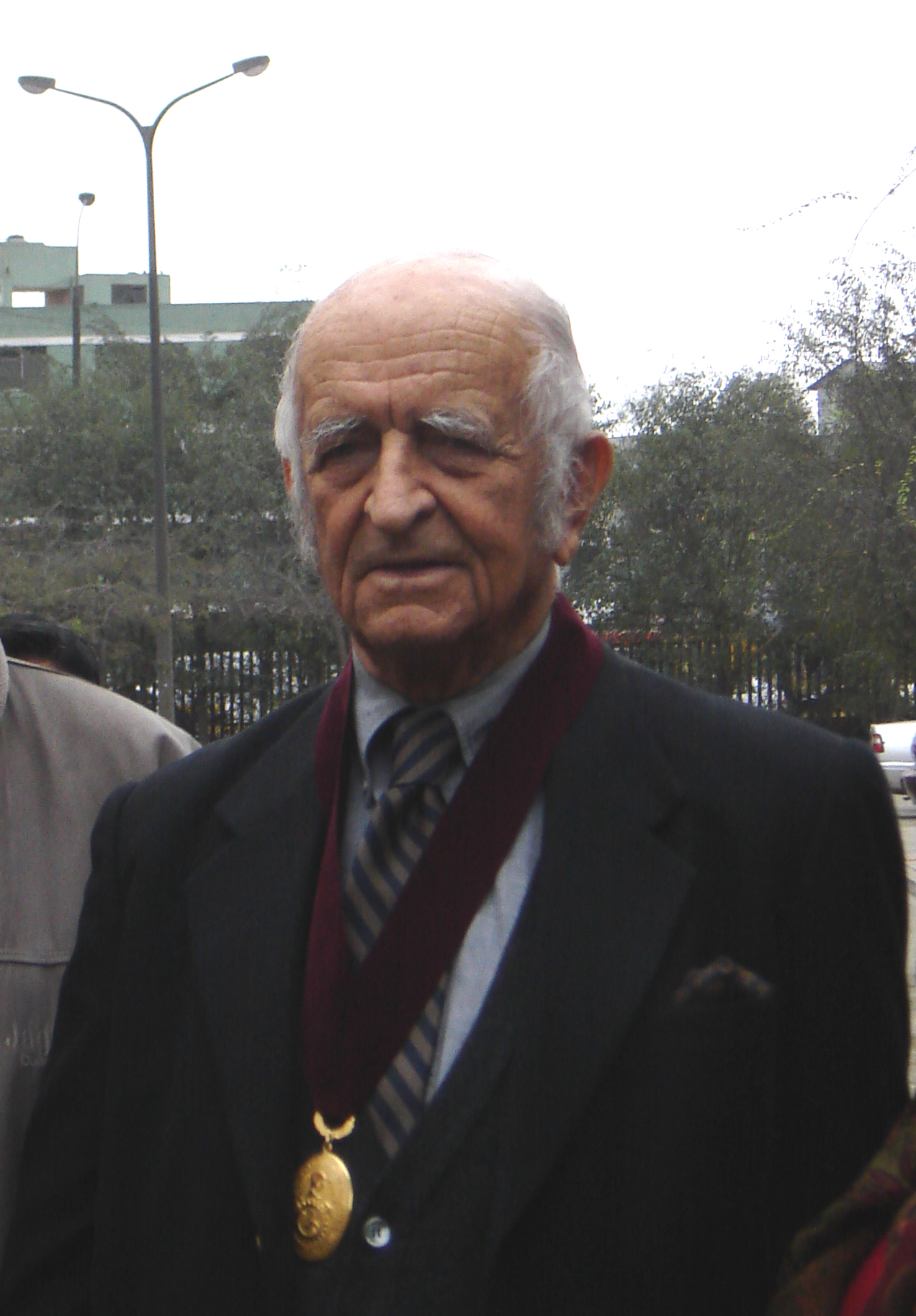
- Fernando de Szyszlo in 2009
- Born: Fernando de Szyszlo Valdelomar; 5 July 1925; Lima, Peru
- Died: 9 October 2017 (aged 92); Lima, Peru
- Education: National University of Engineering; Pontifical Catholic University of Peru
- Known for: Painting, sculpture, printmaking
- Movement: Abstract art, Surrealism, Informalism
- Awards: Order of the Sun of Peru, 2011

Fernando de Szyszlo Valdelomar (5 July 1925 – 9 October 2017) was a Peruvian painter, sculptor, printmaker and teacher. He was a key figure in advancing abstract art in Latin America since the mid-1950s, and one of the leading plastic artists in Peru.

== Life and career ==
Szyszlo was born in Lima, Peru; his mother was a Peruvian citizen of Mestizo ethnicity, and his father was a geographer from Poland. In 1943, Szyszlo entered the architecture school of Peru's National University of Engineering, but abandoned plans to follow that profession and enrolled in the school of plastic arts of the Pontifical Catholic University of Peru. After his graduation in 1948, he traveled to Europe where he studied the works of the masters, particularly Rembrandt, Titian and Tintoretto, and absorbed the varied influences of Cubism, Surrealism, Informalism, and abstraction. Szyszlo lived in Paris and Florence from 1948 to 1955, and then returned to Peru. While in Paris he met Octavio Paz and André Breton and was part of the group of expatriate Latin American artists and writers who met regularly at the Café de Flore, engaging in vigorous discussions on how they could participate in the international modern movement while preserving their Latin American cultural identity. Upon his return to Peru, Szyszlo became a major force for artistic renewal in his country breaking new ground by expressing a Peruvian subject matter in a non-representational style. In 1962, he became a professor of art at Cornell University. In 1965 he became a visiting lecturer at Yale University.

=== Personal life ===
Szyszlo was married to the Peruvian poet Blanca Varela (1926–2009), with whom he had two children. Their second son, Juan Lorenzo, a dual American-Peruvian citizen, was killed in the crash of Faucett Perú Flight 251, near Arequipa on 29 February 1996, aged 36, when he was heading to the city to oversee an exhibition of his father's work there.

Szyszlo died on 9 October 2017, along with his second wife, Lila Yábar (m. 1988) in a domestic accident according to his secretary. At the time of his death, he resided and worked in Lima. A police statement said that Szyszlo "tripped" on the stairs and leaned on his wife, causing them both to fall. They were found with "no vital signs" and "traumatic" head injuries.

== Work ==
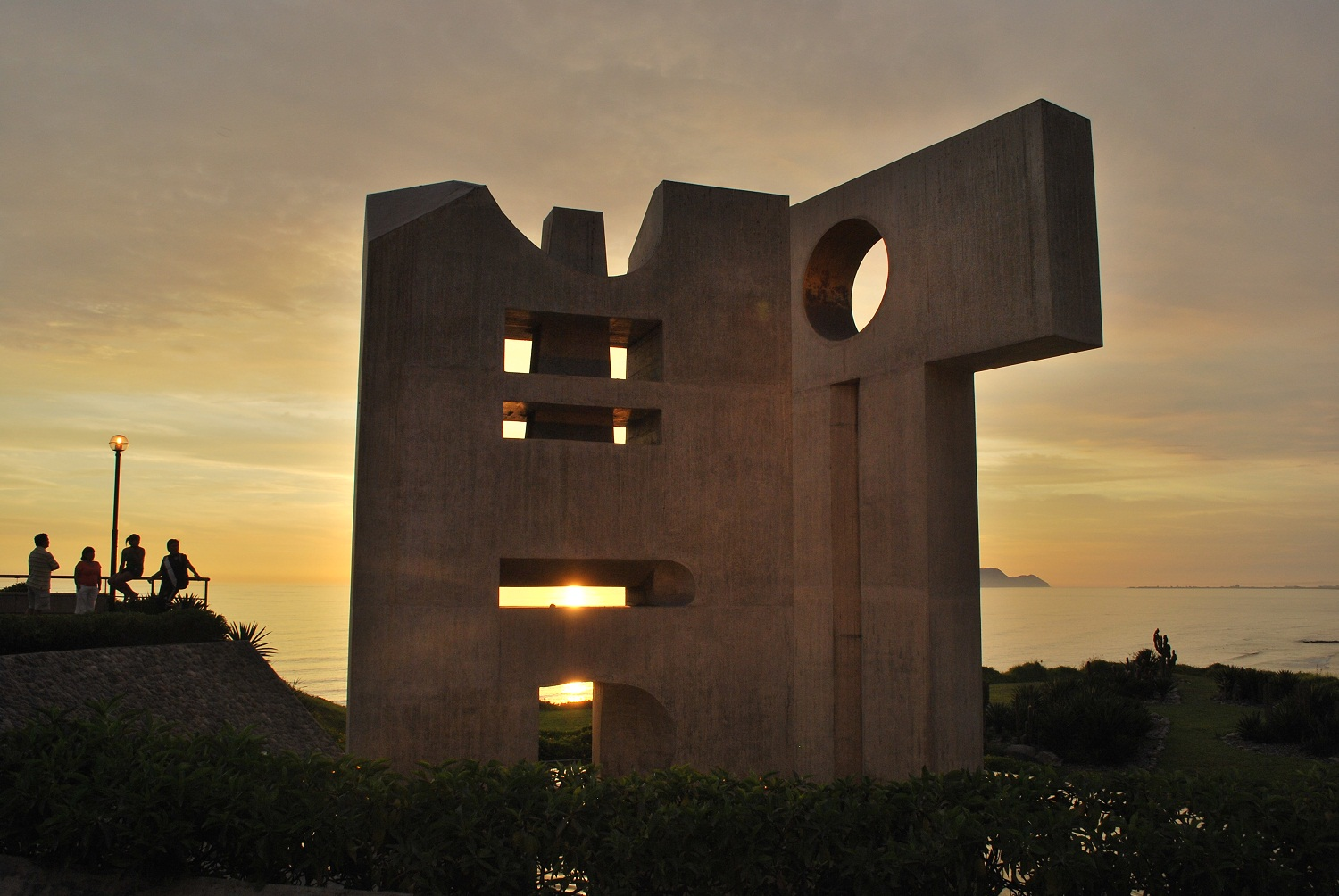
Intihuatana, Szyszlo's sculpture

His work is represented in public and private collections throughout the world, including the Museum of Modern Art, New York; Solomon R. Guggenheim Museum, New York; Anita Shapolsky Gallery, New York; Museum of Fine Arts, Houston; Art Museum of the Americas, Washington, D.C.; Museo de Arte de Lima (Peru); Museu de Arte Moderna, São Paulo, Brazil; Museo Nacional de Arte, La Paz, Bolivia; Museo de Arte Contemporaneo Arequipa (Peru); and the Museum of Latin American Art, Long Beach, California, among others.
