= Blanca Varela =

Peruvian poet

Blanca Leonor Varela Gonzáles (10 August 1926 – 12 March 2009) was a Peruvian poet. Daughter of writer, poet, singer and journalist Serafina Quinteras.

== Biography ==
Blanca Varela was born in Lima. Her mother was a composer who authored many famous creole waltzes.

Varela studied Humanities and Education at the National University of San Marcos where she met other future writers such as Sebastián Salazar Bondy, Javier Sologuren, Jorge Eduardo Eielson, and her future husband, the artist and sculptor Fernando de Szyszlo with whom she had two children. In 1949 they traveled to Paris where she met Octavio Paz, a key figure in her life, who introduced her to the artists and intellectuals there, such as André Breton, Jean-Paul Sartre, Simone de Beauvoir, Henri Michaux, Alberto Giacometti and Fernand Léger, among others; and also other Latin American authors who lived in France at that time, for example Carlos Martínez Rivas.

While in Paris, Varela was part of the group of expatriate Latin American artists and writers who met regularly at the Café de Flore, engaging in vigorous discussions on how they could participate in the international modern movement while preserving their Latin American cultural identity. Paz persuaded her to publish her poetry, and in the preface to the first edition of her debut book Ese puerto existe (1959), he wrote: "At that time we all used to sing. And among those songs, you could hear a lonesome song of one Peruvian girl: Blanca Varela. The most secret, timid, and natural of them all." Rigorous Poetry and Enjoyment; "of rebellion", in the words of Octavio Paz. Later Varela lived in Florence and Washington, D.C. In 1962 she returned to Lima and since then traveled mainly to US, Spain, and France.

She was awarded the Medalla de Honor by the Peruvian National Institute of Culture, the Premio Octavio Paz de Poesía y Ensayo (Octavio Paz Prize for poetry and essays), the Premio Internacional de Poesía Ciudad de Granada Federico García Lorca (City of Granada Federico García Lorca International Poetry Prize, 2006; as the first woman ever), and the Premio Reina Sofía de Poesía Iberoamericana (Queen Sophia's Prize for Iberoamerican Poetry, 2007).

== Personal life ==
Varela was married to Peruvian painter Fernando de Szyszlo, with whom he had two children. Their second son, Juan Lorenzo, a dual American-Peruvian citizen, was killed in the crash of Faucett Perú Flight 251, near Arequipa on 29 February 1996, aged 36.

== Poetry ==
Her poems are surrealist in the way that they try to express the world in an innocent way from the inner space's point of view, yet they cannot prevent cruelty from coming into them from the outside world. This attempt to find perfection with every new poem has, according to Mario Vargas Llosa who used Varela's poem Ternera acosada por tábanos (Calf tortured by horse-flies) as a notable example of her philosophy, "the quality of heroes from ancient myths who die, but fight to the very last moment anyway."

Her books have been translated into English, German, Italian, Portuguese, Russian and Czech.

Collections of poetry

- Ese puerto existe (That port exists), 1959
- Luz de día (Daylight), 1963
- Valses y otras falsas confesiones (Waltzes and other false confessions), 1971
- Ejercicios materiales (Material exercises), 1978-1993
- Canto Villano (Song of dirtiness), 1978
- Camino a Babel (Road to Babel), 1986
- El libro de barro (The Book of Clay), 1993-1994
- Concierto animal (Animals' concert), 1999
- Poesía Escogida
- Como Dios en la Nada (Anthology 1949–1988)
- El falso teclado (The Fake Keyboard), 2001
