= María Nieves y Bustamante =

Peruvian writer

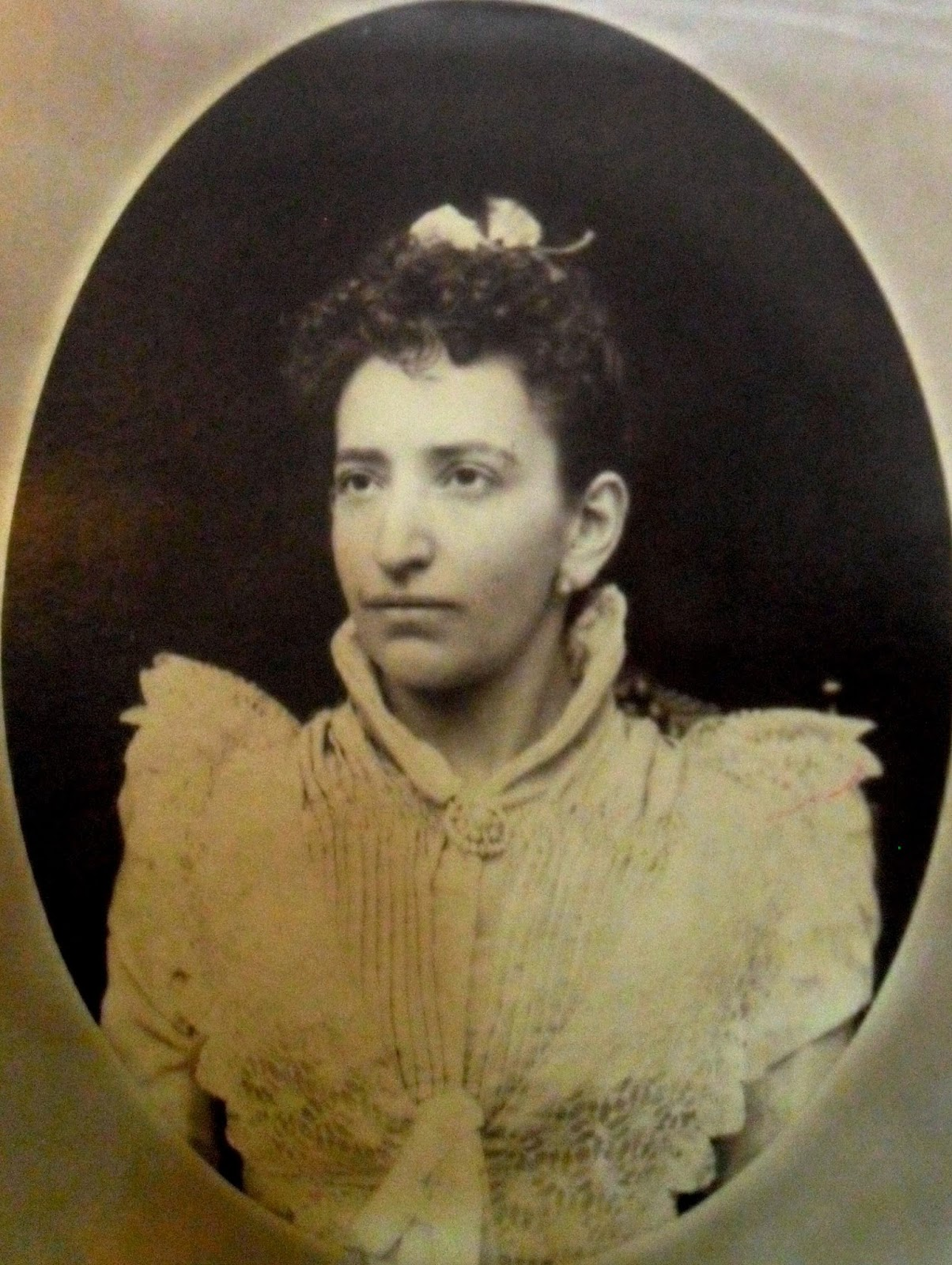
María Nieves y Bustamante

María Nieves y Bustamante (1871–1947) was a Peruvian writer. A contemporary of Clorinda Matto de Turner, they were female members of the country's elite literary circles.
