= Álvaro Torres-Calderón =

Peruvian poet (born 1975)

Álvaro Torres-Calderón Cisneros (born 18 April 1975) is a Peruvian poet and associate professor.

== Biography ==
Torres-Calderón was born in Lima, Peru in 1975.

He obtained his degree in Law and Political Science from the University of Lima, Peru.

He attended the University of Memphis, Tennessee where he graduated with a master's degree in Romance Languages with a concentration in Spanish. He received his doctorate in Latin American Literature of the 19th and 20th centuries from Florida State University.

He has been recognized as member of a new generation of poets in his country. His book of poems Claroscuro talks about his childhood, adolescence and questions about life. It has references to magical beings such as angels, demons and fairies.

He is also a lawyer and studied in his native country and in Spain. Torres-Calderón received his doctorate in literature and Romance languages in the United States.

Torres-Calderón has participated in the publication of the book Alejo Carpentier Ante la Crítica, Caracas: Monte Avila, 2005, with his article "Alejo Carpentier y el Hombre Fronterizo: Una Constante en el Reino de Este Mundo". He also published in the U.S. a set of poems called Spells at the Stonepile Writers Anthology from the North Georgia College & State University Press in November 2010. He has contributed to the Peruvian literary journal Tinta Expresa with the article "Nación, Identidad y Frontera en la Prosa de Clorinda Matto de Turner". Torres-Calderón has participated in several national and international literary conferences as well as interviews in Peruvian newspapers and a radio presentation of his creative works (December 2010). He has performed and assisted in many theatrical works at college and university level and performed musically at the same level. His interests include Integration Law, Latin-American female writers of the 19th century, José Martí, and Latin American civilization.
