= Gloria Macher =

Peruvian-Canadian writer

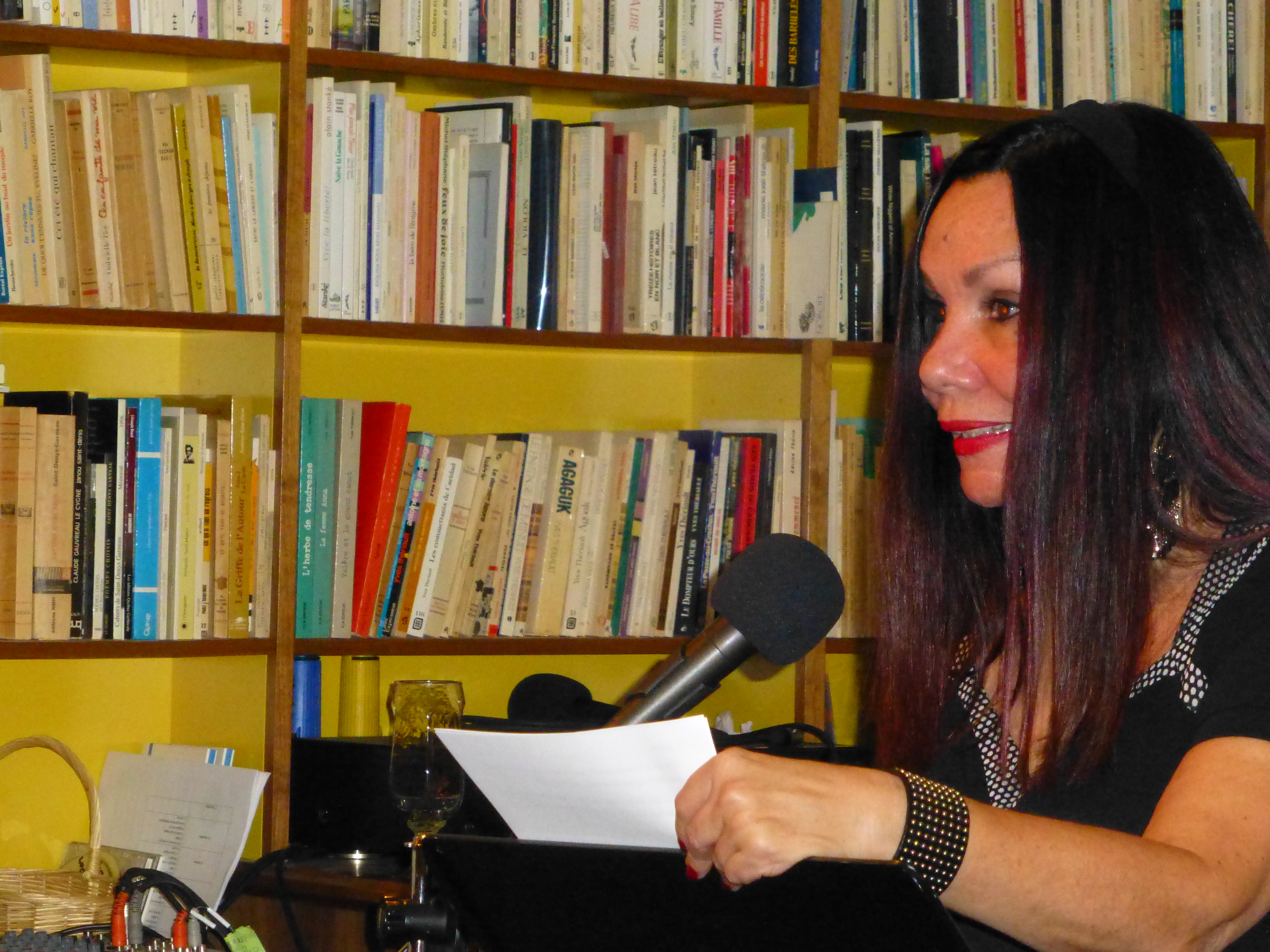
- Born: Lima, Peru
- Education: McGill University; University of Montreal
- Occupation: Writer

Gloria Macher is a Peruvian-Canadian writer living in Montreal. Her work explores social, political, ecological and existential themes. She is considered a main proponent of the contemporary humanistic literary scene.

== Early life and education ==
Macher was born in Lima, Peru and lived in São Paulo and Rio de Janeiro, Brazil, during her childhood and teenage years. She moved to Montreal, Quebec, in 1976 and spent four years in Berkeley, California before making Montreal her permanent residence.

Macher graduated in 1979 with a Bachelor of Arts in Economics, from McGill University and in 1982, she received a Master of Science in Economic and Social Development from the University of Montreal. From 1990 and 1993, she followed courses in Medical Anthropology at McGill University and in 2009, she received a Translation Diploma at the Linguistics Department of McGill University.

== Career ==
During her years working in the research field for the Ministry of Health and Social Services in Quebec, Macher was the author of three publications on the organization of the health and social service sector for the region of Temiscamingue that lead to the restructuring of the health sector in Quebec during the 1980s. She has also participated as co-author and research coordinator in several public health, child adoption, and mental health projects.

After launching her localization and specialized translation firm in 2009, Macher devoted herself to fiction writing. Her novel Las Arterias de Don Fernando has been awarded The International Latino Book Award 2014" by Latin Literacy Now in the United States. Flor de Araribá has been shortlisted for the Verbum Iberoamerican Award 2017 (Finalista del Premio Iberoamericano Verbum de Novela 2017) in Spain. "Protocolo 48" has been shortlisted for the IV Exemplary Novel International Award 2018 granted by the University of Castilla-La Mancha in Spain. She has presented her novels in Europe and the Americas and her short stories and poetry appeared in several anthologies and electronic publications in Canada and Latin-America.

== Influence ==
Her main earliest influence, as a teenager, while living in Brazil, was Charles Dicken's Great Expectations. The social, economic, political and humanistic content was a revelation for Macher and incite her to write at 13 years of age and eventually will also guide her choice of a professional career in economic development. After discovering Charles Dickens, she continued nurturing her taste for social issues with Europeans authors like Victor Hugo, Kafka, and Dostoevsky and later on with Latin American authors like Cesar Vallejo, José Maria Arguedas, and those of the Magic Realism generation. While a teenager Macher also acquired a taste for books dealing with human psychological existence and gender issues, such as Simone de Beauvoir, Jorge Amado, Oscar Wilde and others. Reading was a way of reconciling her sense of loss of having been uprooted at the age of 12 from her birthplace, Lima, Peru.

== Work ==
=== Poetry ===
- Desplazamientos (ISBN 978-84-1337-672-1)

=== Novels ===
- Protocolo 48 (ISBN 978-84-9074-834-3)
- Flor de Araribá (ISBN 978-84-9074-398-0)
- Viajando por Precipicios (ISBN 978-84-9074-398-0)
- La Gringa del Parque (ISBN 978-84-9074-233-4)
- Mi Reina (ISBN 978-84-9074-158-0)
- Las Arterias de don Fernando (ISBN 978-84-9074-107-8)

=== Some of the anthologies and virtual publications ===
- "Flor de Miel" (2017)
- "El Maletín" (2016)
- "La Bella adormecida" y "Bitches Brew" (2016)
- "El Capoeirista" (2016)
- "Todas en Una" (2015)
- "La Sin Nombre" (2014)

== Awards ==
- The International Latino Book Award (2014)
- Finalist for the "Verbum Iberoamerican Novel Award (2017)
- Finalist for the "IV Exemplary Novel International Award 2018" granted by the University of Castilla-La Mancha in Spain
