= Gunter Silva Passuni =

Peruvian writer (born 1977)

Gunter Silva
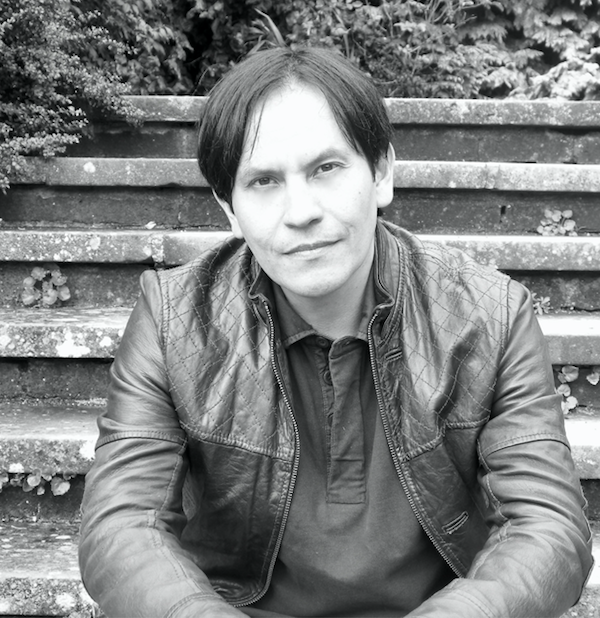
- Gunter Silva Passuni in 2019
- Born: 1977 (age 48–49); La Merced, Junín, Peru
- Education: Catholic University of Santa María, University of Westminster

Gunter Silva (born 1977) is a Peruvian writer.

== Early life ==
Gunter Silva Passuni was born in 1977 in La Merced, Peru. He studied Law at the Catholic University of Santa María in Arequipa. He also holds an MA in Literature and Creative Writing awarded by the University of Westminster.

== Career ==
He published his first short stories collection, Crónicas de Londres (The London Chronicles) in 2012, and in 2016 his second book Pasos Pesados (Steps Through Fire), a novel about a young protagonist called Tiago E. Molina and his turbulent life in Peru during the armed conflict, the setting is the city of Lima at the end of the 80's and the beginning of the 90's. Carlos Fonseca Suárez describes the novel as "the epic of another lost generation that matures in the midst of a ruined and violent homeland". The book was warmly received by the critics, and in 2017 it won a grant from the Danish Arts Foundation, and was translated into Danish as Tiagos overdrevne og vildfarne eventyr.

Neutrino, Cuaderno de Navegación (Neutrino, A Navigator's Logbook), the author’s first exploration of non-fiction, was launched at the Lima International Book Fair in July 2024. Seamlessly combining diary and essay, it explores themes such as the author’s illness, death, and existence, transforming everyday moments and details into profound meditations on human fragility, nostalgia, and uncertainty. The literary magazine Culturamas says about the book: “Neutrino opts for a sober, intimate, and cerebral way of portraying fragility. Its aesthetic approach is an ethical one: facing what hurts head-on, but without embellishment or melodrama.”

He has been invited, among others, to the London Book Fair, Ricardo Palma International Book Fair, Guadalajara, Festival Literatura Copenhagen, and to the First International Conference of Contemporary Peruvian Writers "Palabras Fuera de Lugar" at Milan in 2017, organised by the Peruvian Consulate and the University of Milan.

His short story Herford, won the World Literature Today Translation Prize in 2019.

== Work ==
=== Books ===
- ’'Crónicas de Londres. 'The London Chronicle' (Lima: Atalaya Editores, 2012) ISBN 978 6124 5991 25
- ’'Pasos Pesados. 'Steps Through Fire' (Lima: Fondo Editorial Universitario, UCV, 2016) ISBN 978 6124 1585 82.
- ’’El Baile de los Vencidos. 'The Dance of the Defeated' (Buenos Aires: Equidistancias, 2022) ISBN 9789874866301
- ’'Neutrino, Cuaderno de Navegación’'. ‘Neutrino, A Navigator's Logbook' (Lima: Laboratorio Editorial, 2024) ISBN 978 612 49750 0 4
- ''Viaje al centro de la escritura. 'Ensayos sobre el oficio de narrar'. 'Journey to the Center of Writing: Essays on the Craft of Storytelling' (Lima: Universidad César Vallejo, 2026) ISBN 978-612-5221-29-2

=== Anthologies ===
- Beings, Contemporary Peruvian Short Stories (London, Berforts Press) ISBN 9781908616739
- The Peruvian Short Story, XXI Century (Copenhagen, Aurora Boreal press, No. 17, 2015).
- Lejos. Sedici racconti dal Perú (Roma, Gran Vía Edizioni) ISBN 889 549 268 4
- ‘'Paciencia Perdida. An Anthology of Peruvian Fiction’' Ed. professor Gabriel T. Saxton (Dallas, USA. Dulzorada Press,2022) ISBN 9781953377180
- ‘'La Bruñida Caoba Entre Dos Espejos: Latinoamérica y Escandinavia’’ Eds. professors Jensen, J & Moreno, A (México, Fondo Editorial de la Universidad de Chihuahua, 2022) ISBN 978 607 536 114 7

== See also ==
- Peruvian literature
- Julio Ramón Ribeyro
- Mario Vargas Llosa
- Alonso Cueto
- Daniel Alarcón
- Carlos Yushimito
- Santiago Roncagliolo
