= Martín Adán =

Peruvian poet

Martín Adán (Lima, October 27, 1908 – January 29, 1985), pseudonym of Rafael de la Fuente Benavides, was a Peruvian poet whose body of work is notable for its hermeticism and metaphysical depth.

From a very young age Adán demonstrated great literary talent (talent he shared with classmates Emilio Adolfo Westphalen (ES) and Estuardo Núñez (ES)). As time passed, he lived with increasing economic difficulty and suffered from serious alcoholism. A good part of his final years were spent in sanitariums, until his death in 1985.

The American Beat poet Allen Ginsberg showed interest in Adán's work and in the writer himself. Taking advantage of his trip to Peru where he planned to study the ayahuasca, Ginsberg was able to interview Martín Adán.

He attended the Deutsche Schule Alexander von Humboldt Lima (Colegio Peruano-Alemán Alexander von Humboldt). He made his first studies entering the school at San Jose de Cluny of Barranco. He was educated at the National University of San Marcos (UNMSM) and also at the Pontifical Catholic University of Peru (PUCP).

== Work ==
Martín Adan's first book was the novel La casa de cartón (The Cardboard House). Published in 1928 when the author was only 20 years old, The Cardboard House was influenced by the Avant-garde and is one of the best examples of Peruvian narrative of its time. The novel was told through the paintings of a young man's experiences and reflections and was notable for evoking the district of Lima, Barranco. The Cardboard House's innovative theme and structure can, in some ways, be considered precursorial to novels of the literary boom in Latin America.

The remainder of Adán's work was poetry. It stands out for a profundity of philosophical reflection, that sinks into the mysteries of what is eternal and transcendent. His poetry incorporates a series of images and hermetic, symbolic metaphors (among them, notably, the rose). Adán's poetry mixes novel uses of language with traditional poetic forms like the sonnet. Reality and identity are also common themes in his poetry.

With his body of poetry, Adán tried to achieve a "creación total" (total creation) through "la poesía absoluta" (absolute poetry) and affirm the divine power and omnipotence of the poet who creates realities.

== Books of poetry ==
- La Rosa de la Espinela / (1939)
- Sonetos a la Rosa (1931-1942)
- Travesía de Extramares (1950)
- Escrito a Ciegas (1961)
- La Mano Desasida, Canto a Machupicchu (1964)
- La Piedra Absoluta (1966)
- Mi Darío (1966-1967)
- Diario de Poeta (1966-1973)
- Antología (1989)

== See also ==
- Peruvian literature
- List of Peruvian writers

== Sources ==
- This entry was created as a translation of Martín Adán's entry in the Spanish Language Wikipedia.
- Martín Adán recorded at the Library of Congress for the Hispanic Division's audio literary archive on September 13, 1958.
