= Clemente Palma =

Peruvian writer (1872–1946)

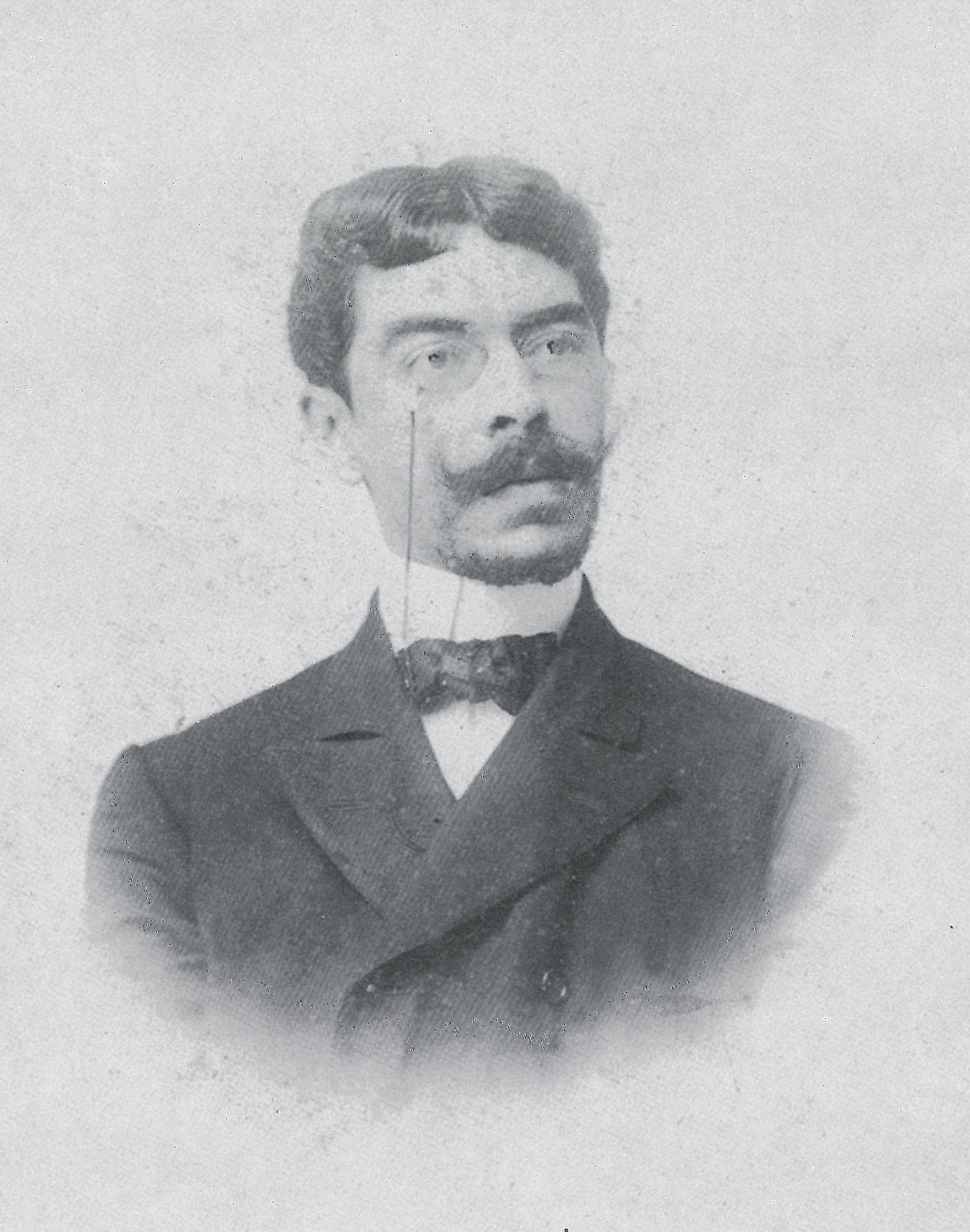
Clemente Palma

Clemente Palma (December 3, 1872, in Lima – August 13, 1946, in Lima) was a Peruvian writer. He was the son of famous Peruvian author and scholar Ricardo Palma and Ecuadorian Clemencia Ramínez. His halfsister Angélica Palma was also a writer.

== Life ==
Clemente Palma y Ramírez was born on December 3, 1872, in Lima, Peru, son of famous Peruvian author Ricardo Palma and Ecuadorian Clemencia Ramírez. On 1876, his father later married Cristina Román, which whom he had seven other children: Félix Vital, Angélica, Ricardo, Peregrina Augusta, Cristina, Cristián and Renée Cristina.

In 1897 he obtained a degree in Letters from the Universidad Nacional Mayor de San Marcos, with a thesis entitled El Porvenir de las Razas en el Perú ("The Future of the Races in Peru") in which he defended the controversial thesis that the Peruvian race had to be improved and that this could be achieved through the introduction of Germans into Peru. He also obtained a doctorate from this university with a thesis on philosophy and art and became a professor at the university subsequently. In 1899 he obtained a bachelor of law degree from the same university. During his university studies, he worked as curator of the National Library of Peru and started his activities as a writer.

From 1902 to 1904 he was the consul of Peru in Barcelona. In Spain he met Maria Manuela Schmalz whom he married in 1902. They had five children: Judith, Clemente Ricardo, Ricardo, Clemencia and Isabel.

Upon his return to Peru, he resumed his position as curator of the National Library of Peru, a post that he held until November 1911. During this period, he founded several cultural and literary magazines such as Prisma and Variedades and the daily newspaper La Crónica. From 1911 to 1918, he dedicated himself to the direction of these magazines. He was director of the magazines Prisma (1906–1908) and Variedades (1908–1931) and the newspaper La Crónica (1912–1929).

Between 1919 and 1930, Clemente Palma was a Member of Parliament, supporting the authoritarian President Augusto B. Leguia, who had taken power through a coup. During this period, he remained active in the press and also taught classes of aesthetics and art history at his alma mater. In 1930, he was imprisoned for a while after the coup of Luis Miguel Sánchez Cerro. He was liberated thanks to the pressure of his friends but was forced into exile to Chile in 1932. He could return to Peru only after the assassination of Luis Miguel Sánchez Cerro in 1933. During his exile in Chile, he wrote the science fiction novel XYZ.

After the publication of this novel, he mainly wrote literary criticism and essays.

== Works ==
Clemente Palma was an important literary critic in Peru and exercised an important influence through the magazine Variedades. In that role, he has been criticized for not recognising the genius of César Vallejo when the latter sent him one of his early poems for review.

Palma's best known works are in the realm of fiction. He is one of the first adherents of modernism in Peru. He made a great contribution to the development of the short story and science fiction in Peru and introduced new themes in its literature. His stories deal mostly with fantastic themes, psychological horror and science fiction. He was attracted to the morbid and many of his characters are abnormal and perverse.

As his father was the director of the National Library of Peru, he had the opportunity to read the works of many foreign authors. His work shows a strong influence of Edgar Allan Poe and, to a lesser extent, nineteenth-century Russian writers and symbolist and decadent French writers, as well as the philosophy of Friedrich Nietzsche. His two short story collections Cuentos malévolos ("Malevolent Tales") (1904) and Historietas Malignas ("Malignant Tales") (1925) are in the style of Villiers de l'Isle-Adam's Contes cruels. Influenced by decadent themes and subject matter, they are filled with dark humor, blasphemy and the supernatural. His Tres cuentos Verdes (1922) were in the style of his father's Tradiciones en Salsa Verde. He also wrote several novels, including Mors et Vita ("Death and Life") (1923) and XYZ (1934). This last novel has some similarities with the science fiction novel The Invention of Morel published by the Argentine Adolfo Bioy Casares in 1940.

The Pontificia Universidad Católica del Perú (PUCP) re-edited the entire narrative work of Clemente Palma, including the novel "XYZ", in 2006.

His major works are:

- "Excursión literaria" (1895)
- "Filosofía y arte" (1897)
- "El porvenir de las razas" (1897),
- "El Perú" (1898)
- "Cuentos Malévolos" (1904)
- "Historietas Malignas" (1925)
- "La cuestión de Tacna y Arica y la conferencia de Washington" (1922)
- "Tres cuentos Verdes" (1922)
- "Mors ex vita" (1923), novel.
- "XYZ" (1934)
- "Había una vez un hombre..." (1935)
- "Don Alonso Henríquez de Guzmán y el primer poema sobre la conquista de América! (1935)
- "Crónicas político-doméstico-taurinas" (1938)
- "La nieta del oidor" (1986, posthumous edition by Ricardo Silva Santisteban).
