= Chalena Vásquez =

Peruvian composer, music researcher and ethnomusicologist

Rosa Elena Vásquez Rodríguez, generally known as Chalena Vásquez, (1950–2017) was a Peruvian composer, music researcher and ethnomusicologist. At the Pontifical Catholic University of Peru (PUCP), she gave courses on folklore and anthropology of art and from 1992 directed the university's Music and Dance Centre. Her books document the history of Andean and Afro-Peruvian music. For La práctica musical de la población negra en el Perú. Danza de Negritos de El Carmen she received the Musicology Award from the Cuban Casa de las Américas in 1982.

== Early life and education ==
Born in 1950 in Sullana, Piura, Rosa Elena Vásquez Rodríguez was the daughter of Héctor Vásquez Rey and Fornariña Rodríguez. She was given the name Chalena by her younger sister who wrote it while she was learning to read. It soon became her official name. From 1967 she studied piano and voice at the music conservatory Carlos Valderrama in Trujillo and then graduated in musicology in 1983 at the National Music Conservatory in Lima. She went on to take post-graduate studies in ethnomusicology and folklore in Venezuela (1977–78).<name=erp/>

== Career ==
In 1987, she undertook a comprehensive study of the carnival in Ayacucho. Later, in 2005, for the National School of Folklore, she completed a methodological proposal covering the entire process behind artistic production in regard to material, social and ideological relationships leading to the distribution and consumption of art.

At the Pontifical Catholic University of Peru (PUCP), she gave courses on folklore and anthropology of art and from 1992 directed the university's Music and Dance Centre. There she edited CDs, DVDs and books while organizing workshops in Peruvian prisons and fighting the oppression of Peru's cultural minorities.

Her major works include La práctica musical de la población negra en el Perú: Danza de Negritos de El Carmen (Musical Practice of Peru's Black Population: Danzas de Negritos from El Carmen, 1981); and in collaboration with Abilio Vergara ¡Chayraq! Carnaval ayacuchano (Chayraq! The Avacucho Carnival, 1988) and Ranulfo, el hombre (Ranulfo, the Mam 1989) are masterpieces of Peruvian musicology.

Chalena Vásquez died in Lima on 11 December 2017.
