= Angélica Palma =

Peruvian journalist and writer

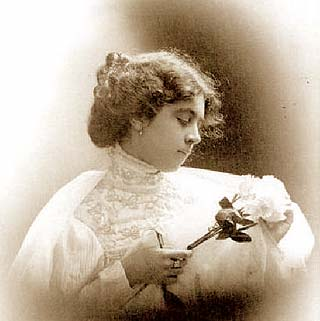
- Angélica Palma in the 1920s
- Born: María Angélica Palma y Román; November 24, 1878; Lima, Peru
- Died: October 25, 1935 (aged 57); Rosario, Argentina
- Occupations: Writer, journalist, essayist
- Notable work: Coloniaje romántico, Por senda propia
- Movement: Modernismo, Feminism
- Relatives: Ricardo Palma (father)

María Angélica Palma y Román (November 24, 1878 – October 25, 1935) was a Peruvian writer, journalist and biographer who was part of the Modernist movement and one of the founders of the feminist movement in her country. She was the daughter of the renowned intellectual Ricardo Palma and the half-sister of the writer Clemente Palma.

== Life ==
Angélica Palma was the daughter of famous Peruvian author and scholar Ricardo Palma and Cristina Román Olivier. Her brother Clemente Palma was also a distinguished Peruvian writer. She received her primary education at a school operated by Teresa González de Fanning. She continued her education under the supervision of her father who held the position of director of the National Library of Peru.

In 1892, she and her brother Ricardo Palma accompanied their father on a trip to Spain, where he represented Peru at the Ninth International Congress of Americanists.

On the death of their father in 1919, Angélica and her sisters Augusta and Renée devoted themselves to the task of publishing their father's principal work, the Tradiciones Peruanas. She edited a selection of her father's writings that was published under the title El Palma de la Juventud (The Palm of Youth) in Lima in 1921. This book constituted a notable contribution to the children's literature of Peru.

She collaborated with various publications in Peru such as Prisma, El Comercio, Variedades, La Crónica until traveling to Spain in 1919.

From 1921 to 1923, she lived in Madrid where she edited her father Ricardo Palma's Tradiciones Peruanas (published in Madrid from 1921 to 1925) and traveled through France, Belgium and England.

In 1926, she attended the Inter-American Congress of Women in Panama and in 1929, she returned to Europe after the Government of Peru appointed her as a delegate to the International Exhibition in Seville. She then participated in the History Congress in Barcelona, where she presented her work on Viceroy Abascal. In 1931, she returned to Lima. In July 1935, the Ministry of Justice and Public Education of Argentina invited her to deliver talks and lectures and participate in various activities in honour of her father such as the unveiling of a bust of her father. Angélica gave talks and lectures at the Cervantes Theater and was present at the tribute paid to her father at the Faculty of Arts at the University of Buenos Aires. She visited la Plata and Montevideo. After traveling to the city of Rosario, she fell ill and shortly after being admitted to the British Sanatorium in Buenos Aires she died from an attack of pneumonia and pleurisy. Her remains were repatriated from Buenos Aires to Peru on 21 March 1936 and buried in the cemetery of Lima.

== Selected works ==
- Vencida (1918)
- Por senda propia (1921)
- Coloniaje romántico (1923)
- Tiempos de la Patria Vieja (1923)
- Uno de tantos (1926)
- Sombra alucinante (1939)
- Contando cuentos, children's stories (1930)

=== Biographies ===
- Fernán Caballero. La novelista novelable (1931)
- Ricardo Palma (1933)

== Sources ==
- Elmore, Nancy, 'Del olvido a la memoria: mujeres peruanas, 1860–1930 : historia gráfica', Lima, Biblioteca Nacional del Perú, 2003.
- Gutiérrez Samanez, Tania C. "La influencia literaria de Ricardo Palma en sus hijos: Angélica Palma", 2007.
- Sirvent de Luca, María Pía de (2012). Angélica Palma: su vida y su obra (1878–1935) (Doctoral thesis). Complutense University of Madrid.
