= Sebastián Salazar Bondy =

- Born: February 4, 1924
- Died: July 4, 1965 (aged 41)
- Occupations: Playwright, journalist

Sebastián Salazar Bondy (February 4, 1924 in Lima – July 4, 1965) was a Peruvian playwright, essayist, poet, and journalist, and among the most important of Peruvian intellectuals.

== Biography ==
Sebastián Salazar Bondy was born in Lima on February 4, 1924. He was born on the street in the Heart of Jesús, in the Chacarilla district in Lima next to the orphan's church [also called the Heart of Jesús], in the heart of the city. At the age of six (1930), he began his formal schooling at the German School of Lima Colegio Alemán de Lima; but after the death of his father he had to move to the Saint Augustine School colegio de San Agustín, of the augustinian priests in Lima. At the age of 13 (1937) the magazine Palabra publishes one of his poems: Canción antes de partir. At the age of 14 (1938) he publishes some of his poems in his school magazine, El mundo agustiniano. At the age of 17 (1941) he entered the Art Faculty of the National University of San Marcos. At the age of 19 (1943) he publishes his first book of poems: Rótulo de la esfinge, in collaboration with Antenor Samaniego; and months later he publishes another entitled: Bahía del dolor. Sebastían Salazar Bondy did not include these two books in any of the relations of his work that he did afterwards.

Despite having started to publish in the 1940s, there are some authors (especially those of teaching literature as a subject in secondary school), who are classified within the generation of the 1950s. What would place him in the same class of writers like Enrique Congrains, Reynoso, Mario Vargas Llosa and Julio Ramón Ribeyro, which is not quite accurate because in some cases he acted as a promoter of the new writers that emerged in that decade.

His theatrical works probably were the most successful of its time. In them, he usually carried out social criticism, in more than one through easy to understand comedies, but with more profound messages which should stimulate reflection about reality. His work denotes a certain influence of Brecht, and is, very likely, the most well-known Peruvian playwright. He died at the age of 41 on July 4, 1965.

== Publications ==
- Voz de vigilia (1944)
- Cuadernos de la persona oscura (1946)
- Máscara del que duerme (1949)
- Tres confesiones (1950)
- Los ojos del pródigo (1951)
- Confidencia en alta voz (1960)
- Vida de Ximena (1960)
- Conducta sentimental (1963)
- Cuadernillo de Oriente (1963)
- El tacto de la araña (1965)
- Lima, la horrible (1964)
- El tacto de la araña / Sombras como cosas sólidas (Poemas 1960–1965) (1966)
- Poemas (1967)
- Sombras como cosas sólidas y otros poemas (1974)

=== Anthologies ===
- Poesía quechua (1964)
- Mil años de poesía peruana (1964)
