= Ricardo Palma =

Peruvian historian (1833–1919)

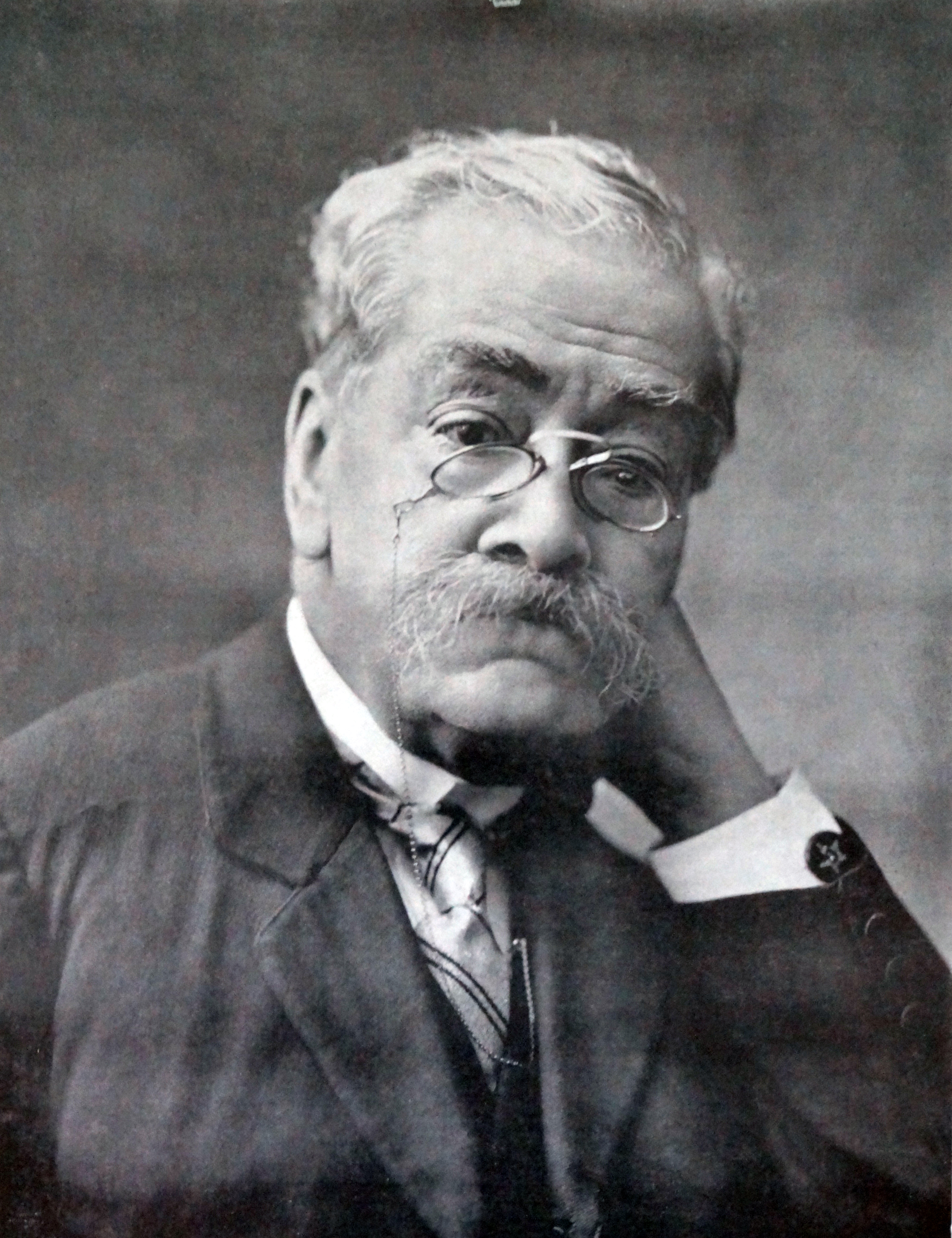
- Palma in 1910
- Born: Manuel Ricardo Palma Carrillo; February 7, 1833; Lima, Peru (disputed)
- Died: October 6, 1919 (aged 86); Miraflores, Lima, Peru
- Occupations: Writer; historian; politician
- Spouse: Cristina Román Olivier
- Children: 8, including Angelica Palma and Clemente Palma
- Writing career
- Notable work: Peruvian Traditions (1872-1910)

Signature
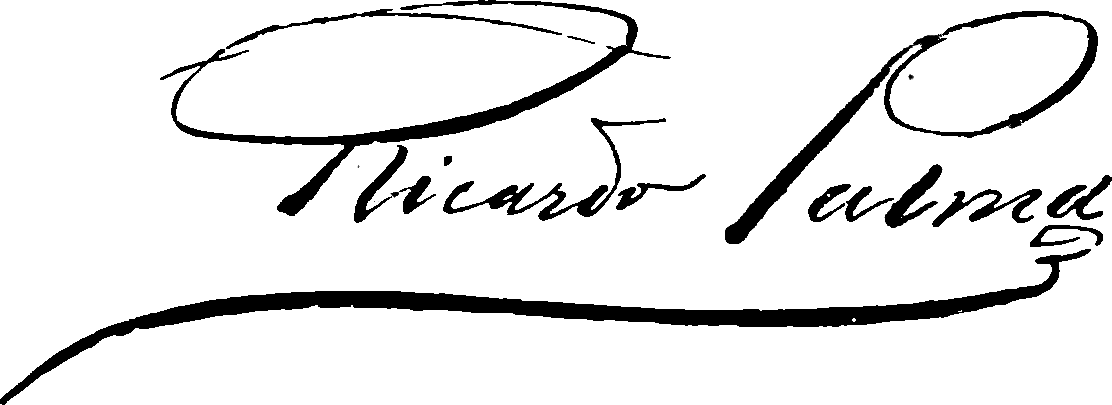

Manuel Ricardo Palma Soriano (February 7, 1833 – October 6, 1919) was a Peruvian author, scholar, librarian and politician. His magnum opus is the Tradiciones peruanas.

== Biography ==
According to the official account, Manuel Ricardo Palma y Carrillo was born on February 7, 1833, in Lima, inscribed as the son of Pedro Ramón Palma and Guillerma Carrillo y Pardos, possibly his grandmother. On April 6, 1837, his father married Dominga Soriano y Carrillo, Guillerma's daughter. However, the documentary evidence shows many contradictions that was pointed out by Monsignor Salvador Herrera Pinto who relying on oral traditions collected and written testimonies directed to him (a catholic bishop) concludes that Ricardo Palma was born in the town of Talavera, province of Andahuaylas, Apurímac Region.

His family was living in Lima after migrating from the province. His mother was a mestiza with African roots. His parents separated when he was still young. He was educated at a Jesuit school and attended the University of San Carlos on an irregular basis. He suspended his studies to perform voluntary service in the Peruvian navy for six years.

From a young age, he dabbled in politics as a member of the liberal camp. In 1860 he, among others, such as José Gálvez Egúsquiza, was believed to have participated in a failed plot against president Ramón Castilla which resulted in an exile to Chile from which he returned in October 1862. He made a trip to Europe in 1864–1865 and when he returned to Lima in 1865 he became involved again in political affairs and public service until 1876. He held the positions of Consul of Peru in Pará, Brazil, Senator for the Loreto and official in the Ministry of War and Navy.

The War of the Pacific (1879–1883) between Chile and Peru disrupted Palma's life and resulted in the virtually complete destruction of his own library as well as that housed in the National Library of Peru. After the war, Palma was named the director of the National Library, a post he held until his retirement in 1912. Palma successfully took on the task of rebuilding the National Library that was ransacked by the occupation forces of the Chilean Army in 1881 following the battle of Lima during the War of the Pacific. Palma was able to bring the National Library back from the ashes so that it regained its previous stature and became recognized once again as one of the top libraries in South America. It was through his personal friendship with the then Chilean president Domingo Santa María that Palma was able to recover an estimated 10,000 books from Chilean hands, as well as many other works which were recovered through his own personal efforts.

With his lover Clemencia Ramírez in 1872, he had his son Clemente Palma, who became a prominent writer of fantastic tales, usually horror stories, that were influenced by Edgar Allan Poe. In 1876, he married Cristina Román y Olivier with whom he had seven children: Félix Vital, Angélica, Ricardo, Peregrina Augusta, Cristina, Cristián and Renée Cristina. His daughter Angélica Palma was also a writer and a member of the early feminist movement in Peru.

== Literary work ==
Ricardo Palma published his first verses and became the editor of a political and satiric newssheet called El Diablo (The Devil) at 15.

During his early years, Ricardo Palma composed romantic dramas (which he later repudiated) and poetry. His first book of verse, Poesías (Poems), appeared in 1855. He gained an early reputation as a historian with his book on the activities of the Spanish Inquisition in Peru during the period of the Viceroyalty (Anales De La Inquisicion De Lima: Estudio Historico, 1863).

He also wrote for the satirical press of Peru where he distinguished himself as a prolific columnist and one of the bastions of Peruvian political satire in the nineteenth century. He collaborated with the satirical sheet El Burro (The Donkey) and became later one of the principal contributors to the satirical magazine La Campana (The Bell). Later he founded the magazine La Broma (The Joke). He was also a regular contributor to serious publications such as El Mercurio, El Correo, La Patria, El Liberal, Revista del Pacífico and Revista de Sud América. He was further active as a foreign newspaper correspondent during the War of the Pacific.

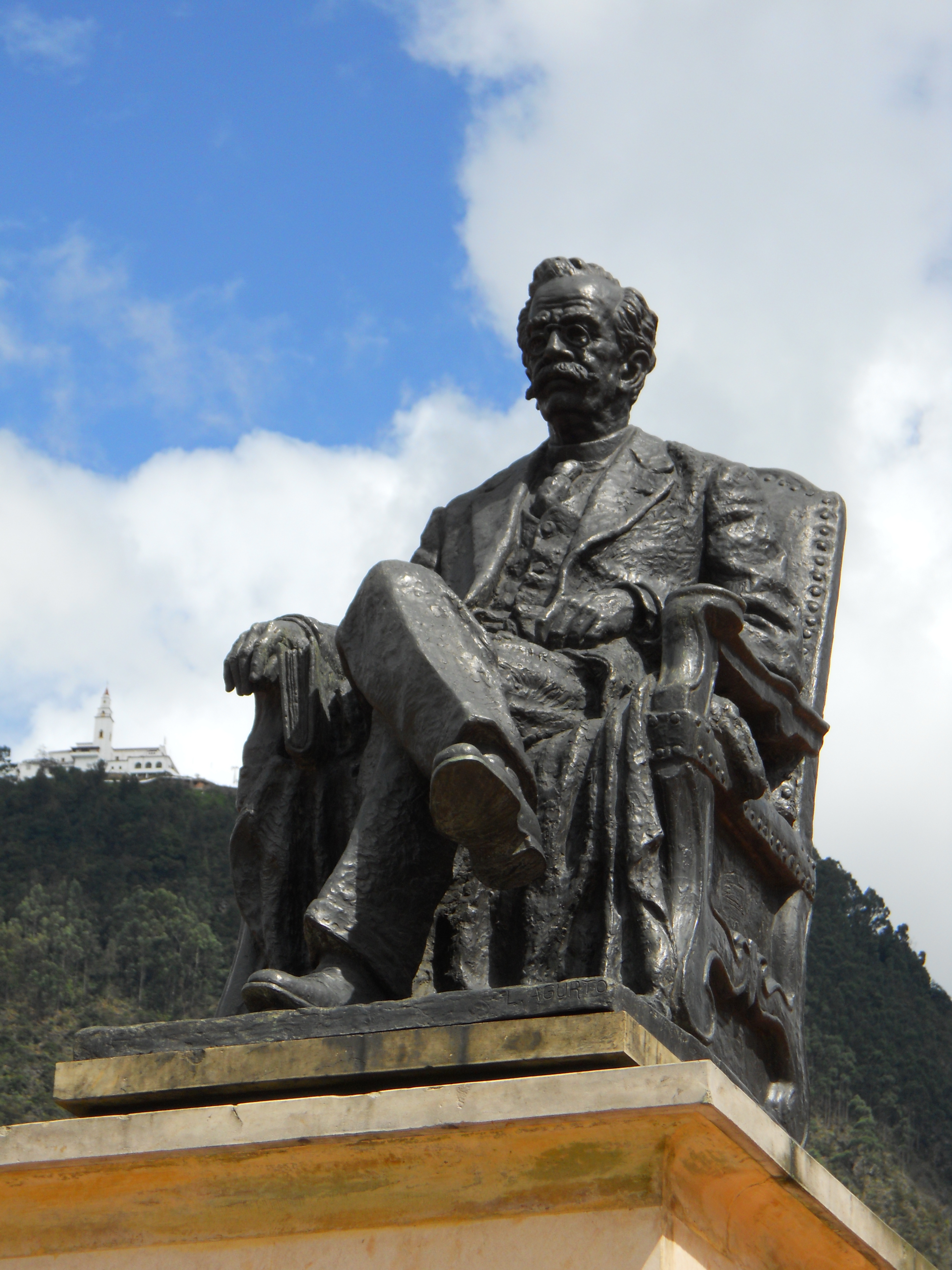
Statue of Palma in Bogotá.

Palma's literary reputation rests upon his creation and development of the literary genre known as tradiciones, short stories that mix history and fiction, written both to amuse and educate, according to the author's declared intention. It was by creatively using poetic license and by deviating from "pure" history that Palma gained his large South American readership. His Tradiciones peruanas span several centuries, with an emphasis on earlier colonial and republican times in Peru.

The Tradiciones were published from 1872 to 1910 in a series of volumes, some of which are freely available on the internet (see the bottom of this page for links). There are also many different editions and selections of the Tradiciones commercially available. The Tradiciones peruanas do not meet formal historical standards of accuracy or reliability sufficiently to be considered "history," but Palma never intended them to be read as "pure" history. Since they are primarily historical fiction, they should be understood and enjoyed as such.

The author's opinion, the opinions of the other primary sources or oral narrators of the stories he collects and transmits, as well as hearsay, play a large role in his stories. One of the best-known of the Tradiciones, especially within American Spanish literature classes, is "La camisa de Margarita"..

Some of the Tradiciones peruanas have been translated into English under the title The Knights of the Cape and Thirty-seven Other Selections from the Tradiciones Peruanas of Ricardo Palma (ed. by Harriet de Onís, 1945) and more recently under the title Peruvian Traditions (ed. by Christopher Conway and translated by Helen Lane, Oxford University Press, 2004).

The Tradiciones peruanas are recognised as a considerable contribution to Peruvian and South American literature. Some critics have classified the Tradiciones as part of nineteenth-century Romanticism.

Palma's Tradiciones en Salsa Verde were published posthumously. These stories are similar to the Tradiciones peruanas but, because of their bawdy nature, they were not published during Palma's lifetime for fear of shocking the sedate Lima establishment.

Throughout his life, Ricardo Palma published various articles and books on history, the results of his own historical research such as the Anales De La Inquisicion De Lima: Estudio Historico (1863) and Monteagudo y Sánchez Carrión (1877). He was a noted linguistic scholar and wrote a number of works on the subject including the Neologismos y americanismos and Papeletas lexográficas. He campaigned for recognition by the Real Academia Española of the Latin-American and Peruvian contributions to the Spanish language.

== Personal letters ==
In 1999, a well-known London auction house announced the sale of a batch of 50 letters that Ricardo Palma had written to an Argentinian friend. The Ministry of Foreign Affairs of Peru persuaded the National Library of Peru on Lima to participate in the auction. It had been more than 50 years since Peru had bought cultural heritage abroad. Today these letters are kept at the National Library of Peru. Ricardo Palma University has recently published the letters of Palma in three volumes (2005–2007).

== See also ==
- Peruvian literature
- List of Peruvian writers
- Sebastina: The Curse, a 2019 film that adapted his short story Mujer y Tigre
