= Manuela Antonia Márquez García-Saavedra =

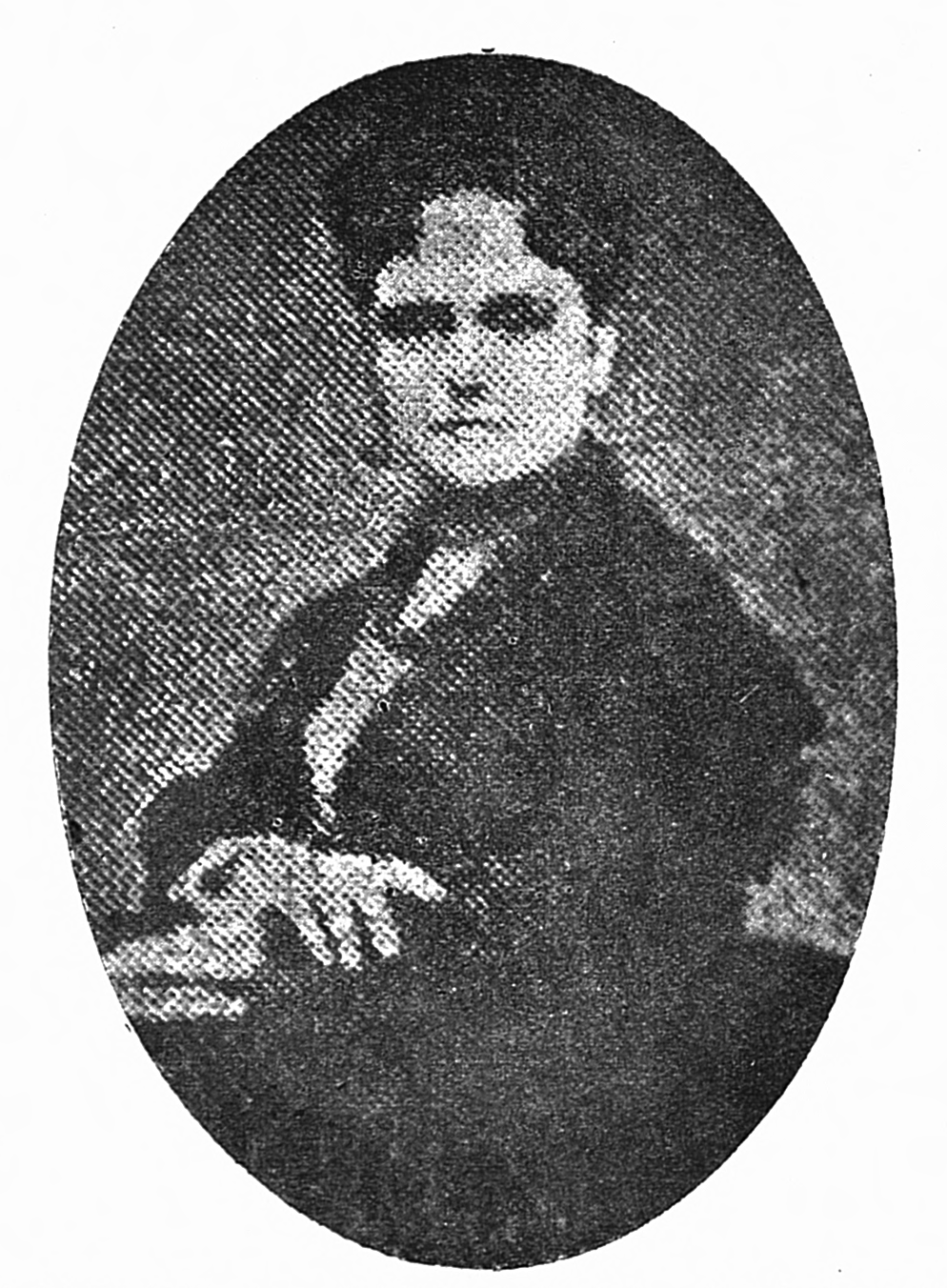
- Born: 1844; Lima
- Died: 1890 (aged 45–46)
- Occupation: Writer
- Relatives: José Arnaldo Márquez

Manuela Antonia Márquez García-Saavedra (1844–1890) was a Peruvian writer, poet, composer and pianist. She was considered to be one of the most prominent poets of the 1870 generation. Marquez also wrote prose articles, and a score for the dramatic zarzuela composed by brother, Arnaldo Márquez, titled La Novia del Colegial. Her first articles were published in El Correo del Perú and El Cosmorama, always with a pseudonym.

== Biography ==
Manuela Antonia Márquez García-Saavedra descended from a family that was successful in the fine arts. She was the sister of Luis and Arnaldo Márquez, considered among the first great writers of Peru.

She studied at the Colegio Sagrados Corazones Belén of Lima, and published articles and poems with diverse publications like El Correo de Perú, El Cosmorama, or La Alborada. Some poems were included in the collective works Parnaso peruano (1871) and Poetisas americanas (1896). Her numerous poems were scattered in magazines over many years, but were forgotten later.

In addition to her literary talents, Marquez was an excellent pianist who also wrote beautiful lyrics. She was the author of several compositions for singing and piano, as well as a dramatic zarzuela entitled La novia del colegial.

Marquez was the mother of the writer Delia Castro Márquez and grandmother of the writer Serafina Quinteras.
