= Manuela Villarán de Plasencia =

Peruvian writer (1840-1888)

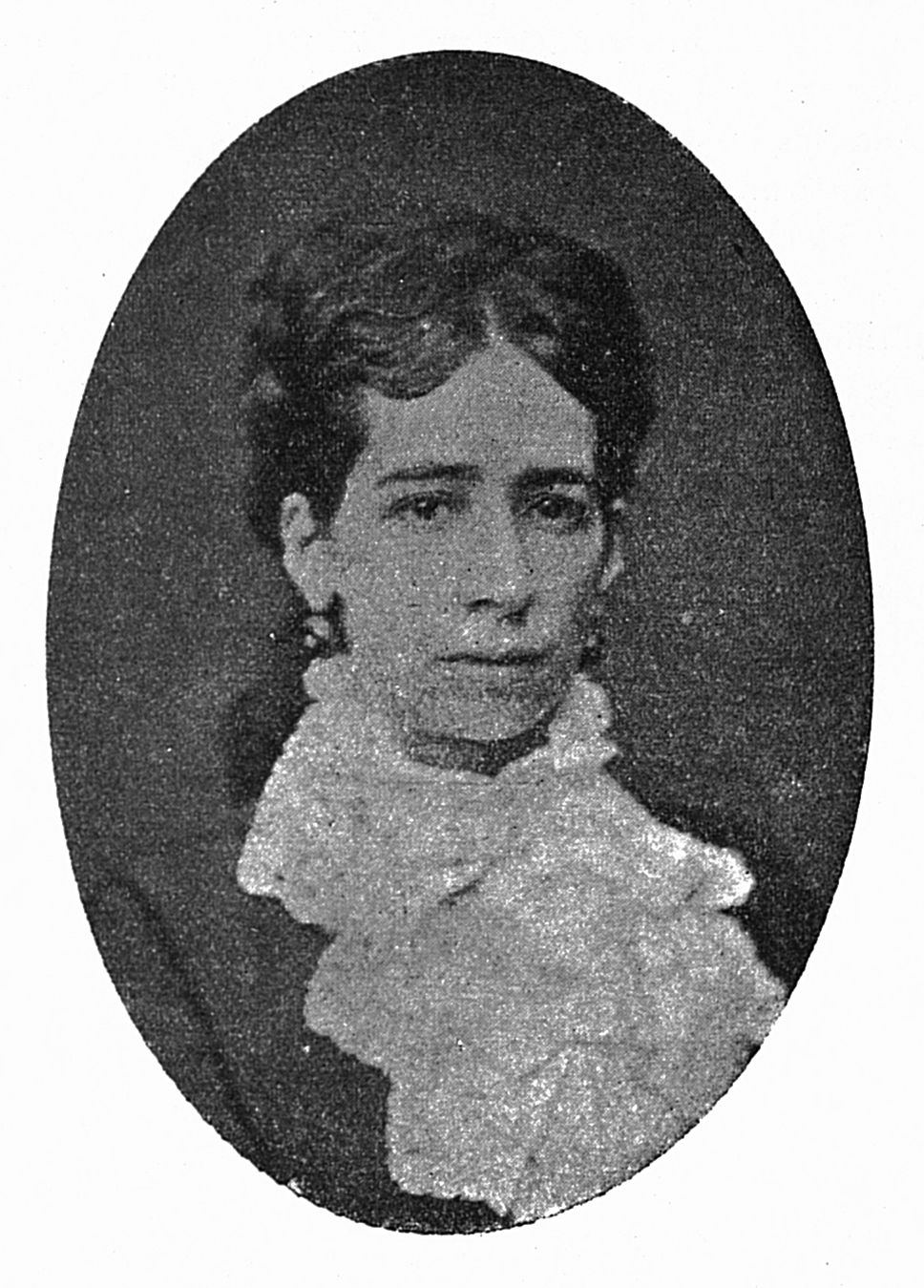

Manuela Villarán de Plasencia (1840–1888) was a Peruvian writer, poet, and journalist.

== Biography ==
Manuela Villarán de Plasencia was born in 1840 in Lima. Her father was Manuel Vicente Villarán González and her mother Nicolasa Angulo Jiménez.

In 1854, Manuela married Rafael Fuentes, the captain of the Ayacucho battalion. Manuela Villarán de Plasencia became one of the first enlightened Peruvian women to actively pursue a career in journalism. She worked with several magazines, such as El Álbum, La Alborada, El Parnaso Peruano, and many others.

Aside from that, during 1876 and 1877, she helped in organizing the gatherings of the Argentine writer Juana Manuela Gorriti. She also dedicated a poem to Juana Manuela Gorriti, who inspired her by nurturing a close relationship with Manuela, among other disciples. The name of the poem is "A la eminente escritora Juana Manuela Gorriti".

When the War of the Pacific between Chile, Peru, and Bolivia started, she lost her only son Ernesto Plasencia. Which motivated her to write an elegy titled "To Ernesto" or "A Ernesto".

She died a few years later in 1888 at the age of 48.

== Literature ==
=== Theater plays ===
- "Agencia matrimonial"
- "A la Eminente Escritora Juana Manuela Gorriti"
- "A Ernesto"

=== Poetry ===
- "Cantos íntimos de una madre"

=== "Inconvenientes para la emancipación de la mujer" fragment ===
Venga la pluma, el tintero,

y de papel un pedazo:

es preciso que comience

á escribir hoy un mosaico,

pero tocan. Quién será?

suelto el borrador y salgo

es un necio que pregunta

si aquí vive don Fulano.

Vuelvo á mi asiento y escribo

tres renglones. Oigo el llanto

de mi última pequeñita

que reclama mis cuidados

acudo á tranquilizarla

aun con la pluma en la mano;

vuelvo a la mesa y ya traigo

un cuartetito pensado....

Vuelvo á mi empezado escrito,

voy medio el hilo tomando...

Me sorprende una visita,

á saludarla me paro,

los papeles se me vuelan

y se cae el diccionario.

Por supuesto que me olvido

de lo que estaba buscando...

Cumplo, pues, con mis deberes

más allá de lo mandado.

Mi conciencia está tranquila

á pesar de mis trabajos;

pero esta vida, lectora,

que ves a vuelo de pájaro

es lo que yo considero

un verdadero mosaico.
