= Ana Varela Tafur =

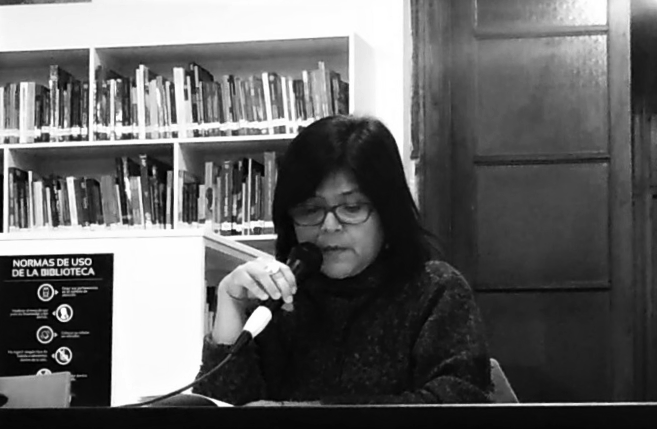
- Born: 15 June 1963 (age 63); Iquitos, Peru
- Education: Universidad Nacional de la Amazonía Peruana (UNAP)
- Occupations: Poet and professor
- Notable work: Lo que no veo en visiones, Voces desde la orilla

Ana Denise Varela Tafur (born 15 June 1963) is a Peruvian poet part of the literary 90's Generation. She is a member of the Urcututu group, and she won the Premio Copé in Poetry in 1991.

== Biography ==
Ana Varela was born on 15 June 1963 in Iquitos, the capital city of the Maynas Province and Loreto Region. She is the Daughter of Luis Alberto Vaerla Lozano and Teolina Tafur Pasmiño, both Loreto natives. Her formal education began in 1968 at the Jardín de Infancia Emilia Barcía Boniffatti(the first kindergarten in Iquitos). Her primary education continued through the Colegio República Alemana Unificada and the Colegio Parroquial Nuestra Señora de Loreto. From 1975 to 1979, she studied at the Colegio Secundario Sagrado Corazón. She began writing at a young age through diaries, writing about her day-to-day life.

In 1980 she was admitted into the Department of Education and Humanities at the Universidad Nacional de la Amazonía Peruana (UNAP) to study Chemical Engineering, and later, Language and Literature.

Iquitos was the cultural and literary epicenter of the Amazon in the 20th century Peru. During this time, most of the notable works and cultural movements emerged from this city.

One example is the Grupo Cultural Urcututu. In 1983, Ana Varela was invited, along with the poets Carlos Reyes Ramírez y Percy Vílchez Vela, to become a part of the Urcututu group, a cultural collective that gathered Loretan painters, performers, and writers. Collectively, they sought to reaffirm an Amazonian Identity and publicly denounce the problems suffered by Amazonians in their historical context.

In 1988 she directed the “Bubinzana”, the cultural column of the newspaper Revista Proceso, headed by the loretan poet and editor Javier Dávila Durand. Previously, she headed the magazine Revista Cultural Varadero and collaborated with Semanario Kanatari de Iquitos.

== Urcututu Group ==
The Grupo Culutral Urcututu - which gets its name from the sound an owl makes, known as the wise bird - began in 1979 as a theatrical group under the direction of the Cuzco actor and director Manuel Luna Mendoza. He gathered painters, theater artists and writers from Loreto. Collectively, they had the objective of reaffirming the identity of the Amazonian towns, the realization of the native tradition and the public condemnation of the different problems suffered by the communities in the Amazon. They additionally aim to do so within the regions' historic context, such as the exploitation of natural rubber, oil extraction, the cultivation of cocoa, the destruction of the forests, the exploitation of animals, the contamination of rivers and waterways, and the numerous consequences that climate change has had on the region.

== Recognition ==
Ana Varela was recognized as a Personalidad Meritoria de la Cultura by the Ministry of Culture of Peru for her intellectual and creative contributions to the nation, most notably her work promoting Amazonian literature in 2021. In 2022, the Embassy of Peru in Italy recognized four nationals, Tafur among them, for their work in promoting Peru’s culture in Rome. They were recognized for their work in fields including performing arts, dance, literary production, and cinematography. And, in 2023, Varela won the Premio Nacional de Literatura in the category of poetry.
