= Rafael Dumett =

Peruvian writer

Rafael Dumett (born 1963 in Lima) is a Peruvian writer, author of El espía del Inca (2019) and El camarada Jorge y el Dragón (2023). For the latter book, he was awarded Peru's National Prize for Literature.

El espía del Inca is described by the Argentine newspaper, Página 12, as a "monumental novel about the rise and fall of the Tahuantinsuyu."

Dumett has been featured at the Hay Festival for literature as well as at universities such as Harvard, King's College, London, and Whitman College.
