= María Emma Mannarelli =

Peruvian writer

María Emma Mannarelli Cavagnari
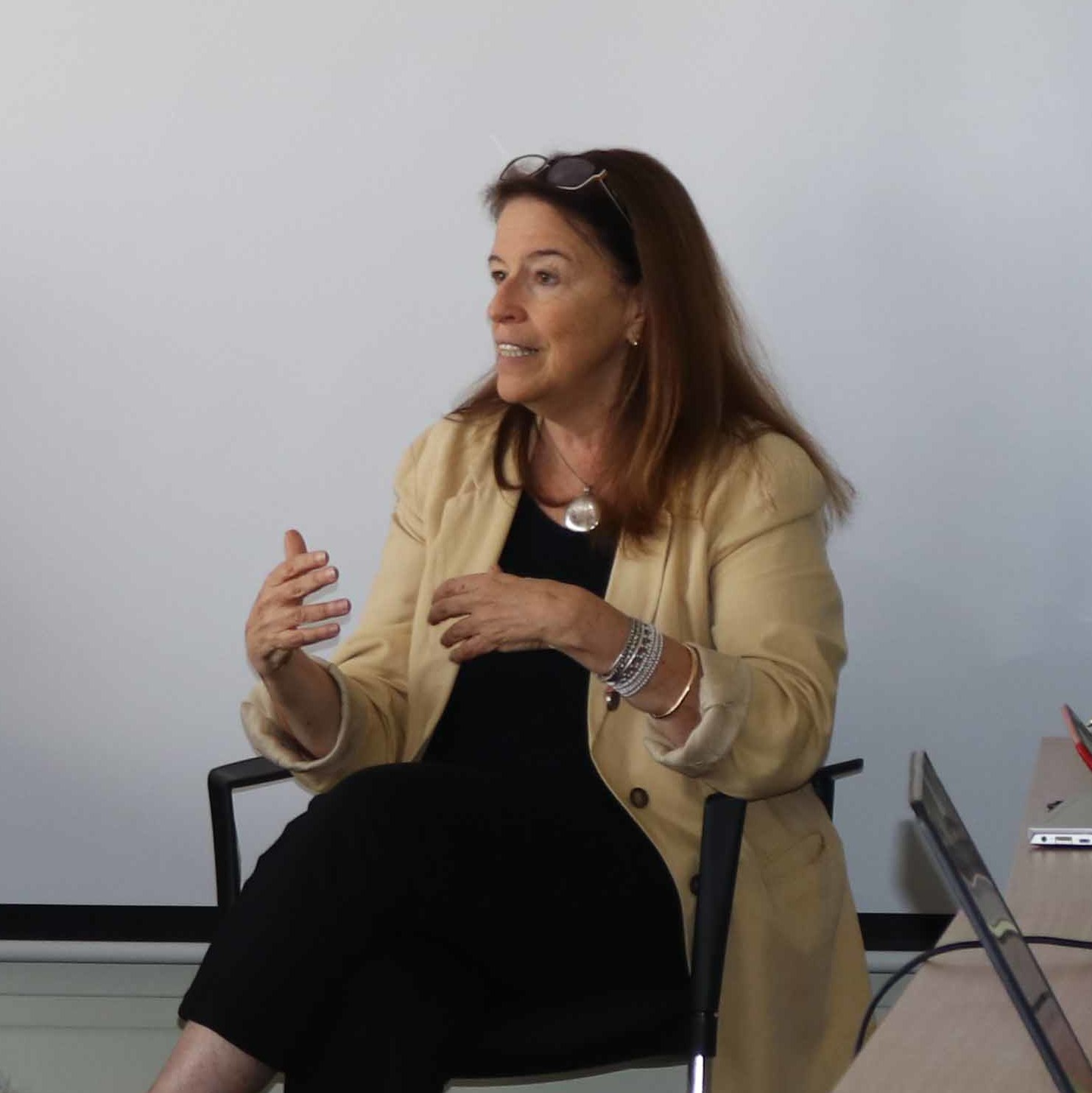
- Born: October 11, 1954 (age 72); Lima, Peru
- Occupations: writer; historian; professor

Academic background
- Education: National University of San Marcos (Ph.D.); Columbia University (Ph.D.)

Academic work
- Discipline: gender studies; social history
- Institutions: National University of San Marcos

María Emma Mannarelli Cavagnari (born October 11, 1954) is a Peruvian feminist writer, historian, and professor. She is the founder and coordinator of the Gender Studies Program at the National University of San Marcos (UNMSM), where she also serves as director of the School of History and coordinator of the Master's in Gender and Development Studies.

== Early life and education ==
María Emma Mannarelli Cavagnari was born in Lima, Peru, on October 11, 1954. She decided on her vocation within the family environment, where her grandmother proudly remembered the exploits of her father during the war with Chile.

Mannarelli studied history at Pontifical Catholic University of Peru (PUCP) where she obtained a bachelor's degree with the thesis entitled "Jorge Basadre: su obra y 'La República Aristocrática'" (Jorge Basadre: his work and 'The Aristocratic Republic') (1982), graduating later. She pursued graduate studies at Columbia University (New York City), earning a master's degree in Philosophy and Arts, and in 1994, a Ph.D. in history.

== Career and research ==
Upon her return to Peru, Mannarelli was the founder and coordinator of the Gender Studies Program at UNMSM, where she is a senior professor at the Faculty of Social Sciences. She has served as visiting professor at Harvard University, Stanford University, the University of California, Davis, Columbia University, and the College of the Holy Cross, as well as Cayetano Heredia University, Universidad Andina Simón Bolívar, and others. She is a researcher at the Flora Tristán Peruvian Women's Center. From 2018 til November 2019, she served as Institutional Head of the National Library of Peru.

She has received research grants from the Tinker Foundation, the Carlos Chagas Foundation, the Fulbright Program, the Latin American Council of Social Sciences, South-South Exchange Programme for Research on the History of Development (SEPHIS), the John Simon Guggenheim Memorial Foundation, and the David Rockefeller Center for Latin American Studies.

Mannarelli's most influential works include, Pecados públicos. La ilegitimidad en Lima, siglo XVII (1993), Limpias y modernas. Género, cultura e higiene en la Lima del Novecientos (1999), Hechiceras, beatas y expósitas. Mujeres y poder inquisitorial en Lima (1998), and Las mujeres y sus propuestas educativas, 1870-1930 (2013).

== Selected works ==
- Pecados públicos. La ilegitimidad en Lima, siglo XVII (1993)
- Private Passions and Public Sins, Men and Women in Seventeenth-Century Lima (Thesis/dissertation; 1994)
- Limpias y modernas. Género, cultura e higiene en la Lima del Novecientos (1999)
- Hechiceras, beatas y expósitas. Mujeres y poder inquisitorial en Lima (1998)
- Relaciones con condiciones : el Estado peruano frente a su infancia. (with Nicola Anne Jones; 2007)
- Desarrollo rural y sexualidad : reflexiones comparativas (2008)
- Las mujeres y sus propuestas educativas, 1870-1930 (2013)
- Educación del ciudadano y disciplina social 1821-1860 (with Magdalena Chocano Mena; 2013)
- De la casa a la política : escritos colectivos de las mujeres organizadas de Lima (with María Arboleda; 2015)
- La domesticación de las mujeres : patriarcado y género en la historia peruana (2018)

=== Contributor ===
- Jerarquías en jaque estudios de género en el área andina : (resultado del Seminario Estado del debate sobre las relaciones de género en el área andina, en Lima, 11 y 12 de septiembre del año 2003) (2004)
- Colección pensamiento educativo peruano (2013)
- Autobiografía del Perú republicano : ensayos sobre historia y la narrativa del yo (2015)
