= Peruvian Traditions =

Short story collection by Ricardo Palma

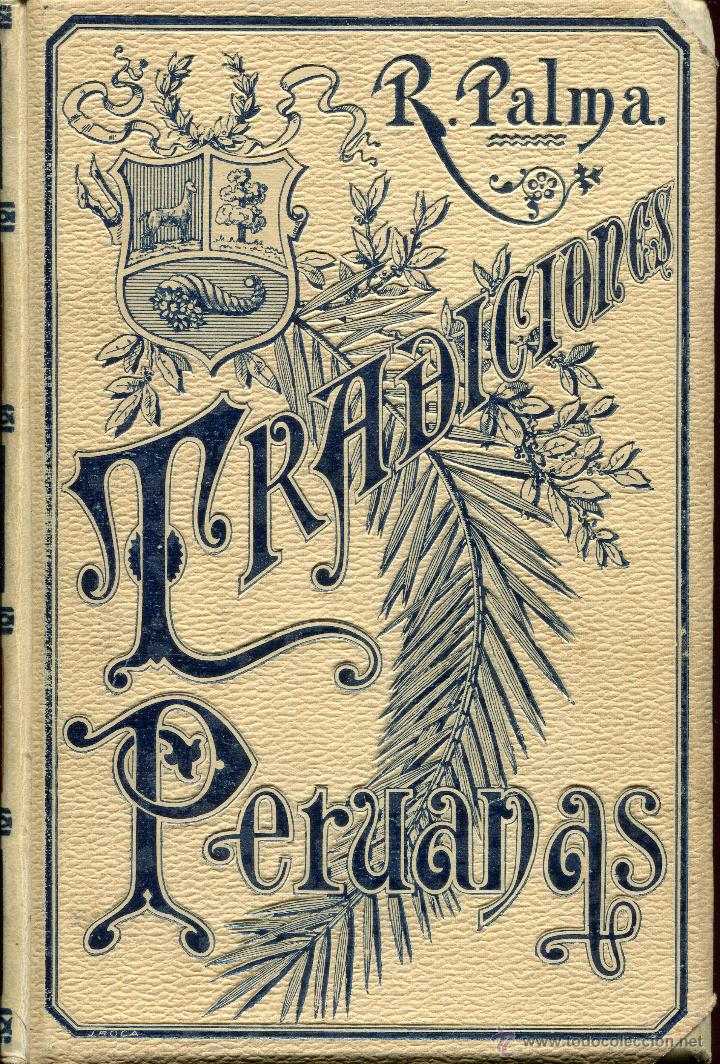
- Author: Ricardo Palma
- Original title: Tradiciones peruanas
- Language: Spanish
- Publication date: 1872–1910
- Publication place: Peru

Peruvian Traditions (Spanish: Tradiciones peruanas) is a compendium of some of the writings of the Peruvian writer Ricardo Palma.

== Introduction ==
The writings, which are collectively known as the Tradiciones, started appearing in 1863 in newspapers and magazines. They are short stories of historical fiction that relate events based on historical fact and that are descriptive of the way people lived in different moments in the Peruvian history. Their value as historical sources is limited, but their literary value is great.

Some of the Tradiciones peruanas have been translated into English under the title The Knights of the Cape and Thirty-seven Other Selections from the Tradiciones Peruanas of Ricardo Palma (ed. Harriet de Onís, 1945) and more recently under the title Peruvian Traditions (ed. Christopher Conway and trans. Helen Lane, Oxford University Press, 2004).

== Characteristics ==
Some of the key characteristics of the Traditions are:

- Use of popular language full of proverbs, sayings, songs and verses.
- Some stories are based on historical events that are backed up by archives or documents (Palma was librarian of the Biblioteca Nacional del Perú)
- Other stories with no firm historical basis are used to explain facts, such as the names of streets and houses in Lima.
- Oral tone, often containing a dialog with the reader. (The writer sometimes refers to himself in the third person plural).
- Critique of political, social, and religious institutions of the era.
- Mostly set in Lima, but with a significant portion of the stories set in the rest of what used to be the Viceroyalty of Peru.

== Publications ==
The Traditions were published in the following order:

- 1872 First part.
- 1874 Second part.
- 1875 Third part.
- 1877 Fourth part.
- 1883 Tradiciones, from the first to the sixth part recompilation.
- 1889 Ropa vieja, seventh part.
- 1891 Ropa apolillada, eighth part.
- 1906 Mis Últimas Tradiciones, ninth part.
- 1910 Apéndice a mis últimas tradiciones peruanas, tenth part.

The adjective "Peruanas" ("Peruvian") was not used by Palma. The adjective was used for the first time in 1890 on their first publication in Argentina.

There are in total 453 Traditions of which six are set during the Incan Empire, 339 during the Viceroyalty, 43 during the Emancipation, 49 during the Republic and 16 that cannot be placed within a specific period.
