= Virginia Vargas =

Peruvian sociologist

Virginia "Gina" Vargas Valente (born 23 July 1945) is a Peruvian sociologist and a well-known figure in the women's movement in her country.

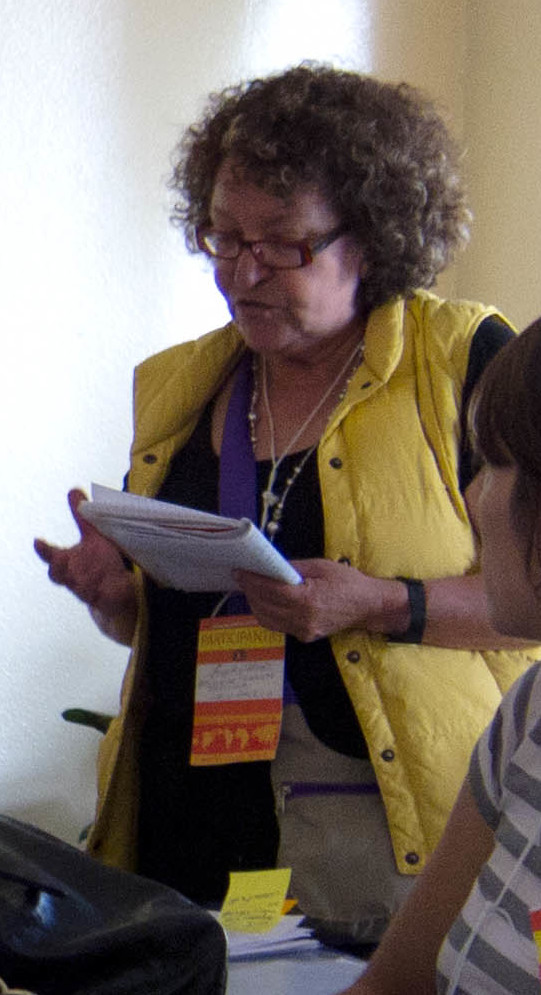
Vargas at the World Social Forum 2011

== Biography ==
Virginia Vargas was born on 23 July 1945 in Lima, Peru, the second of four children. Following secondary school, Vargas attended Pontifical Catholic University of Peru from 1963 to 1968. She was initially interested in drama and literature, but later turned her focus to political science.

In 1978 Vargas founded the Flora Tristán Center, a non-governmental Peruvian organization that studies, educates, and lobbies for women's rights. She served as the organization's coordinator and later its director until 1990. Vargas has pushed for reproductive rights for women in Peru and is recognized internationally as a leading Peruvian women's rights campaigner.

As a researcher, Vargas has studied social movements of the Southern Cone and the role of women in economic development.

Vargas traveled throughout Peru during the 1980s through a program of the Red de Mujeres de Educación Popular de Consejo de Educacion de Adultos de Americano Latino (CEAAL), a regional organization of the International Council for Adult Education. She organized regional women's movement seminars around methodology and theory.

Vargas worked as an organizer and activist in Latin America from 1990 until 1998. She founded the Latin American division of DAWN (Development Alternatives with Women for a New Era) and campaigned against the sterilization of women in 1998. She took a position as professor at the International Institute of Social Studies in The Hague, Netherlands for the Women and Development Program, teaching for two months out of the year. She has been a visiting professor to gender studies programs at the University of Wisconsin in the United States as well as in Latin America and Peru. She is an active participant in the Articulación Feminista Marcosur, a Latin American feminist political network.

Vargas was the recipient of a UNIFEM Award during the United Nations' Fourth World Conference on Women in Beijing in September 1995. She was the Latin American and Caribbean NGO Coordinator for the conference's NGO Forum. Beginning in 2001, Vargas became part of the World Social Forum's International Committee. She is also on the Advisory Council of the National University of San Marcos' Institute for Democracy and Global Transformation.

== Selected publications ==
=== As editor ===
- "Peasantry in History: A Chronology of the Peasant Movements, 1956‑64" (1981)
- "Economic and Social Participation of Women in Peru" (1982)
- compiled "A New Approach: Gender in Development" (1991)
- "Gender in Development" (1992)
- "The Triangle of Empowerment", “The Road to Beijing” (1998)
- El movimiento feminista en el horizonte político peruano . Ediciones Flora Tristán. Lima (2007)
- Feminismos en América Latina. Su aporte a la política y a la democracia. Colección Transformación Global. Programa Democracia y Transformación Global. Fondo Editorial Universidad Nacional Mayor de San Marcos. Flora Tristán Ediciones, Lima (2008)

=== As author ===
- "The Contribution of Women's Rebellion" (1989)
- Vargas, Virginia (1990). The Women's Movement in Peru: Rebellion into Action. The Hague: International Institute of Social Studies. ISBN 9781856493185.
- "How to Change the World Without Losing Ourselves" (1992)
- Vargas, Virginia (November 2003). "Feminism, globalization and the global justice and solidarity movement". Cultural Studies. 17 (6): 905–920. doi:10.1080/0950238032000150093. S2CID 146567590.

== See also ==
- Women in Peru
