= Jorge Vinatea Reinoso =

Peruvian painter

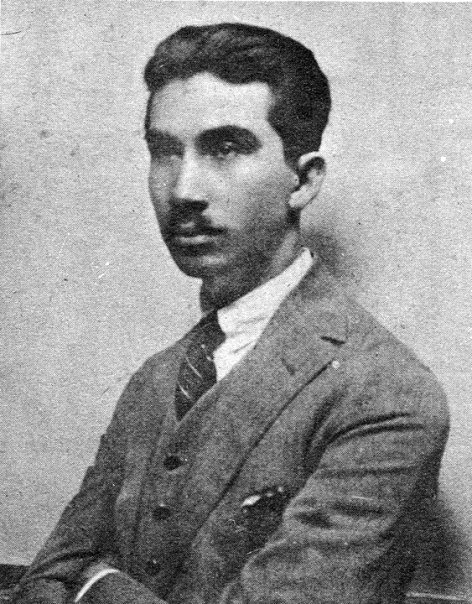
- Born: Jorge Segundo Vinatea Reinoso; April 22, 1900; Arequipa, Peru
- Died: July 15, 1931 (aged 31); Arequipa, Peru
- Education: Escuela Nacional Superior Autónoma de Bellas Artes
- Known for: Painting, caricature, illustration
- Notable work: Travesuras de Serrucho y Volatín (comic strip)
- Style: Indigenismo, caricature
- Movement: Indigenismo (associated)

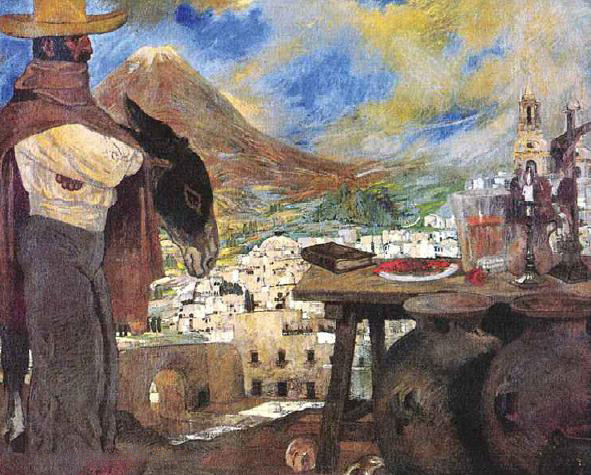
The Peasant Poet

Jorge Segundo Vinatea Reinoso, or Reynoso (22 April 1900, in Arequipa – 15 July 1931, in Arequipa) was a Peruvian painter and caricaturist. His art falls within the indigenismo category, although he was not part of the movement led by José Sabogal.

== Biography ==
He was the eighth child of a poor family, but he was able to study at the "Colegio Nacional de la Independencia Americana", a government school created by order of Simón Bolívar. His talent for art had manifested itself at an early age, when he made watercolor landscapes of the area around his home. His first exhibition was held when he was only seventeen, in the photography studio of Max T. Vargas (1874–1959), father of Alberto Vargas.

The following year, he went to Lima, where he found employment drawing caricatures and cartoons for the weekly cultural and literary magazine Sudamérica, whose contributors included José Carlos Mariátegui, César Vallejo and Abraham Valdelomar. That same year, he enrolled at the Escuela Nacional Superior Autónoma de Bellas Artes, where he studied with Daniel Hernández Morillo, a rigorous teacher in the Academic style who had spent most of his life in Europe. He also studied with the Spanish sculptor, Manuel Piqueras Cotolí. In the following years, he worked as an illustrator for the magazines Mundial and Variedades. In 1922, his comic strip, Travesuras de Serrucho y Volatín, was one of the first in Peru to use speech balloons.

In 1924, he finished his studies and joined the faculty at the Escuela. Two years later, he held a major exhibition and his works received critical praise. Together with his friend, Alejandro González Trujillo, he travelled to Puno, Cuzco and other parts of southern Peru, where he created some of his best known indigenista paintings.

Intensely concentrated on his work, he ignored his health and died of tuberculosis, aged only thirty-one.
