= Centralism (Peru) =

Centralization of wealth in Lima, Peru

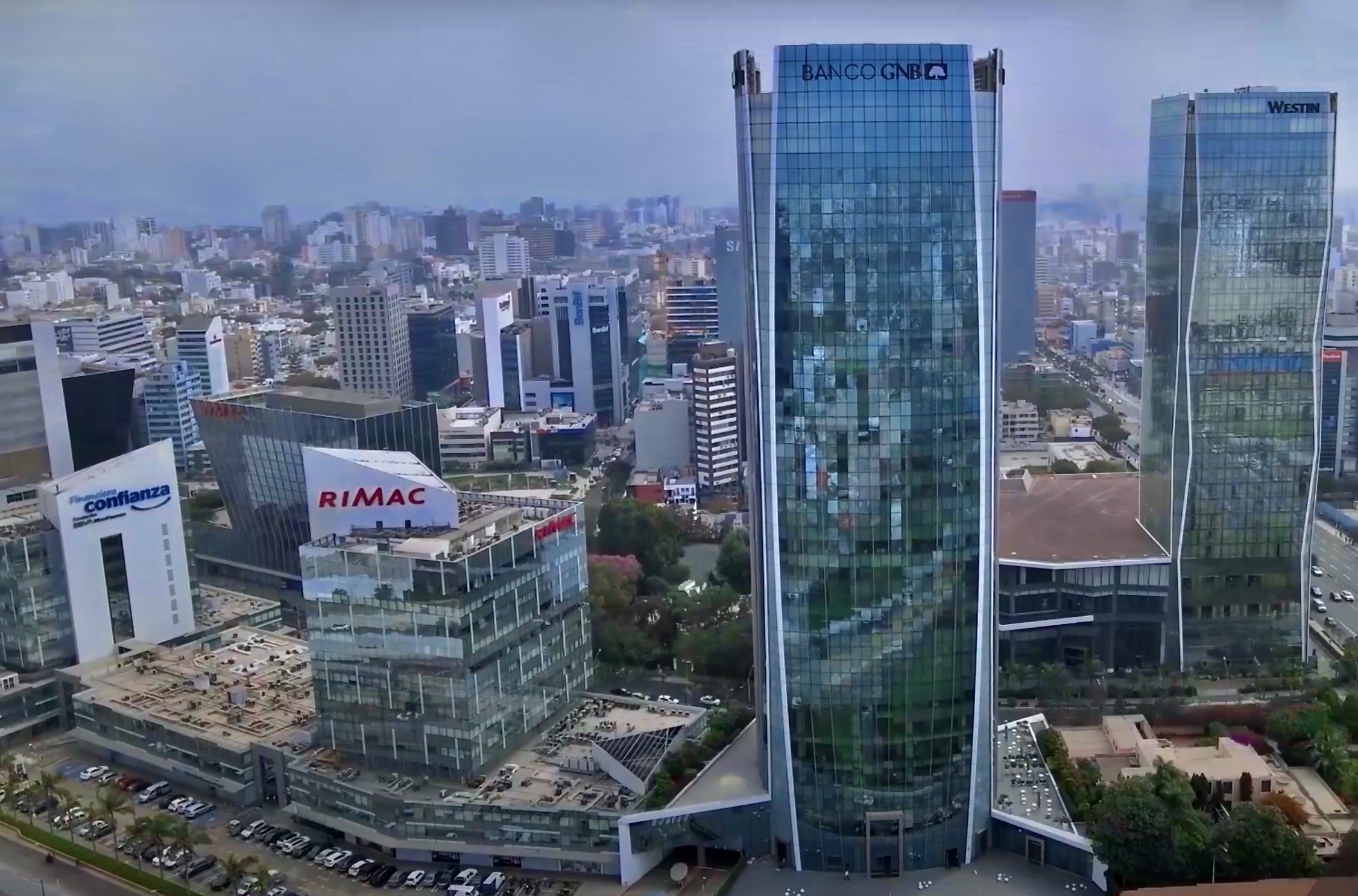
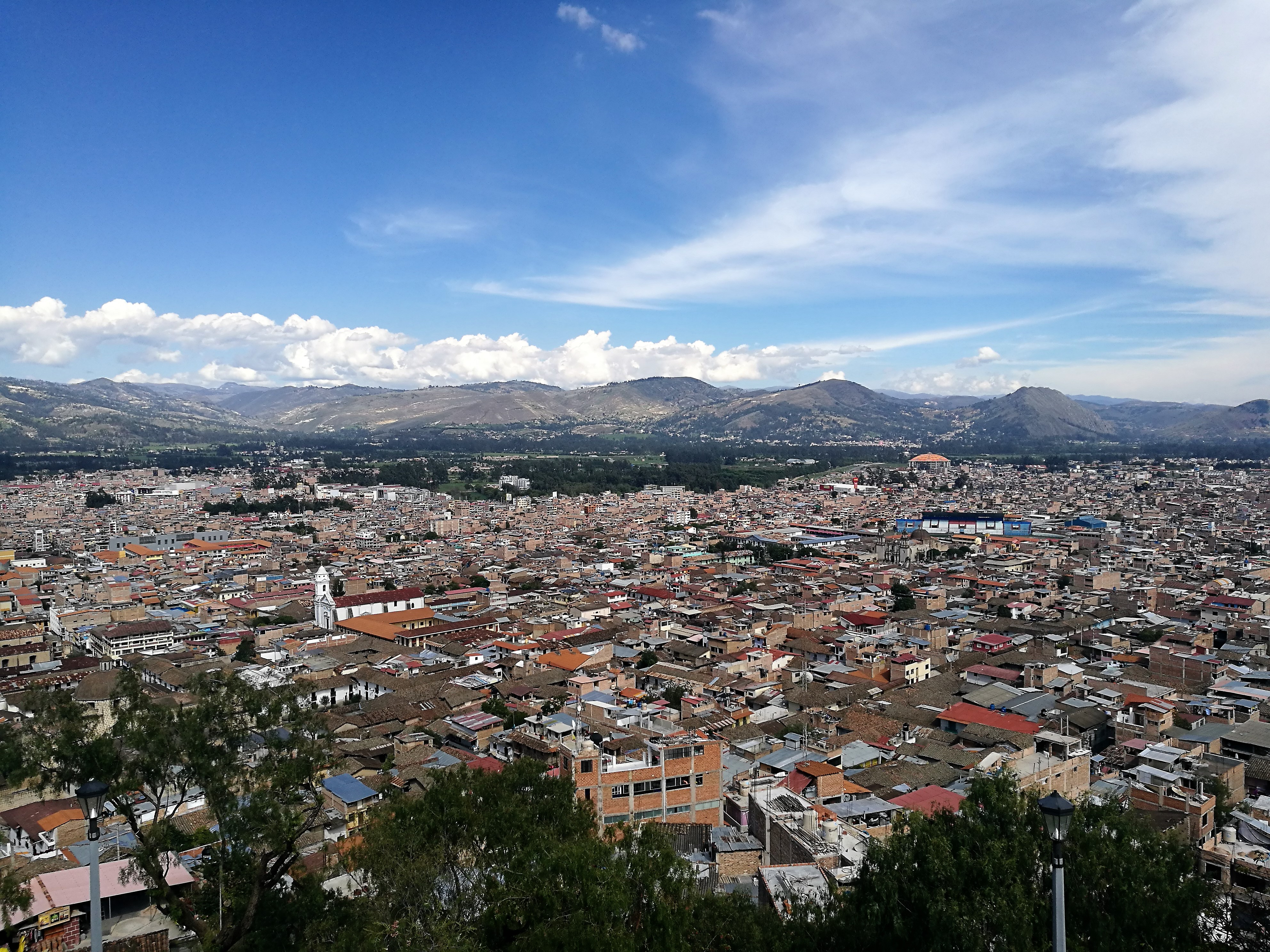
San Isidro (left), the modern financial center of Lima
Cajamarca (right), one of Peru's poorest cities near the world's fourth largest gold mine

Centralism (Spanish: centralismo) is the common act of the social elite in Peru accumulating, or centralizing, wealth and development along the coast of the Pacific Ocean, particularly in the capital city of Lima. This practice has occurred throughout Peru's history and has resulted with large levels of economic inequality, political alienation and other disparities in rural regions, with Lima acquiring the majority of socioeconomic benefits in the nation.

== History ==
The Viceroyalty of Peru was the most centralized colony of the Spanish Empire, with administration being limited outside of Lima, especially throughout the Andes. Following the independence of Peru from the Spanish Empire, the economic elite focused their power on the coastal regions while the rural provinces were governed by existing serfdom practices by hacienda landowners. This centralization mainly benefited the criollo elites. While founding the nation, elites worked towards cultural hegemonization and homogenization, enforcing Lima's control over smaller local governments. One method of achieving this was through the design of education in Peru; aristocrats organized a national education system that promoted conservatism and authoritarianism while also defending a social hierarchy that prevented social mobility.

The Government of Peru displayed little interference in the public sector throughout the nation's history since Peru frequently experienced commodities booms that benefitted white elites on the coast, instead of the indigenous majority in rural areas, with businesses focusing on bringing commodities from inland Peru to export on the coast. During the Guano Era in the mid-1800s, the income obtained from guano and other resources was used to "[placing] the rest of the nation under the influence of its centralizing military and bureaucracy." President Ramón Castilla would use state funding to enforce control over local governments as Peru experienced this economic growth. Until the middle of the twentieth century, the government in Lima would enforce policy in outlying areas through an intermediator known as a gamonal, usually a prominent local individual, with the state and gamonal achieving their objectives while the native populations had little influence on local decisions.

As globalization intensified later into the twentieth century, distances between urban and rural areas increased, with larger cities increasing their ability to connect to the economy and increasing their wealth while smaller cities experienced resource and human capital flight to larger cities. President José Pardo y Barreda during the Aristocratic Republic period attempted to establish centralized support of his government by promoting Peruvian nationalism. When Fernando Belaúnde won the 1963 Peruvian general election, his government made modest improvements by increasing industrialization and constructing highways into the Andes. Belaúnde held a doctrine called "The Conquest of Peru by Peruvians", which promoted the exploitation of resources in the Amazon and other outlying areas of Peru through conquest. In one 1964 incident called the Matsé genocide, the Belaúnde administration targeted the Matsés after two loggers were killed, with the Peruvian armed forces and American fighter planes dropping napalm on the indigenous groups armed with bows and arrows, killing hundreds.

There were attempts on the part of trying to decentralize the administration. One of them was the fight against the "Lima centralism" of President Alejandro Toledo, who, in the context of the privatization of public companies in the 1990s, was responsible for the "national participatory budget" and for reforming the 1993 Constitution to promote subnational entities. However, the differences in income between the capital and the rest of the country did not decrease. The government of the president and military Juan Velasco Alvarado at the time, he sought to fix this problem with the agrarian reform of 1969, in addition to trying to decentralize the media outside of Lima, due to geographical and linguistic difficulties. However, due to the large number of nationalizations, monopolization and political control at the general level was only sought from the military.

Many Peruvians in rural areas were not able to vote until 1979 when the constitution allowed illiterate individuals to vote, with eleven of eighteen democratically elected presidents of Peru being from Lima between 1919 and 2021. The wealth earned between 1990 and 2020 was not distributed throughout the country; living standards showed disparities between the more-developed capital city of Lima and similar coastal regions while rural provinces remained impoverished.

During the 2021 Peruvian general election, the candidacy of Pedro Castillo brought attention to the centralism divide, with much of his support being earned in the exterior regions of the country. In May 2021, Americas Quarterly wrote: "Life expectancy in Huancavelica, for example, the region where Castillo received his highest share of the vote in the first round, is seven years shorter than in Lima. In Puno, where Castillo received over 47% of the vote, the infant mortality rate is almost three times that of Lima's." The existing disparities in Peru caused a "globalization fatigue" according to Asensio, resulting in a polarization between rural and urban areas that saw differing priorities with lifestyle, economics and politics. Asensio writes that Castillo, being recognized as a "true Peruvian" by his supporters, was able to capitalize on the "globalization fatigue" sentiments shared by the rural population and establish support by saying he would reverse the favoritism of Lima and defending regional rights. This divide created by centralism would be a factor contributing towards the 2022–2023 Peruvian protests.

The northern and southern coasts of Peru are underveloped in terms of port capacity relative to the central region around Lima and El Callao. This contributes to most of Bolivias maritime trade going through Chilean ports. The opening of the large port of Chancay in central Peru in 2024, albeit needed given crowding at El Callao, conforms to this pattern.

== Effects ==
Centralism prevented development in Peru, hampering progressivism movements and making the establishment of a national economy impossible. It also contributed to systemic racism in Peru since the wealth and education centralized in Lima created a perception amongst Limeños that rural indigenous individuals were inferior. Younger and more mobile individuals moved from rural regions to Lima as well, contributing to slower development in the outlying province among an aging population.

== Analysis ==
Centralism has been described as "one of the structural evils that accompanied the Republic from its inception to the present", with the disparities between the provinces and Lima being one of the largest examples of income inequality in Latin America. Beginning in the early 1900s, Peruvian intellectuals from the rural provinces began to respond to centralism by promoting regionalism, or the spread of development from Lima to the outlying regions. Thorough analysis of the phenomenon began with the Marxist–Leninist philosopher José Carlos Mariátegui in his essay "Regionalism and centralism" of his Seven Interpretive Essays on Peruvian Reality.

In the context of Peru's socioeconomic crisis during the COVID-19 pandemic in Peru, Kahhat stated that "market reforms in Peru have yielded positive results in terms of reducing poverty ... But what the pandemic has laid bare, particularly in Peru, is that poverty was reduced while leaving the miserable state of public services unaltered – most clearly in the case of health services." Some sociologists describe that Peruvian people see that all the natural resources are in the countryside but all the benefits are concentrated mostly in Lima.

== See also ==
- Lima Consensus
- Western alienation, similar concept in Canada.
