= Seven Interpretive Essays on Peruvian Reality =

1928 book by José Carlos Mariátegui

- First edition cover by Julia Codesido.
- Author: José Carlos Mariátegui
- Original title: Siete Ensayos de Interpretación de la Realidad Peruana
- Language: Spanish
- Published: 1928
- Publication place: Peru
- Original text: Siete Ensayos de Interpretación de la Realidad Peruana at Spanish Wikisource

Seven Interpretive Essays on Peruvian Reality (Spanish: Siete Ensayos de Interpretación de la Realidad Peruana, also known as Los 7 Ensayos or the Seven Essays), published in 1928, is the most famous written work of the Peruvian socialist writer José Carlos Mariátegui and considered his magnum opus. It was published in Lima, in 1928, and is credited with establishing its author as one of the most widespread Marxist voices in Latin America. It is a work that has been reissued dozens of times, in addition to being translated into Russian, French, English, Italian, Portuguese and Hungarian.

== Background ==
As a framework for the author's book, Mariátegui used a series of articles he had published periodically in magazines such as Mundial and Amauta. In this book, Mariátegui proposed to apply the principles of historical materialism to attempt a complete re-evaluation of the Peruvian reality. In the prologue, he advises that he is not an impartial and objective critic, but that his judgments are informed by his ideals, sentiments, and passions. The essays cover diverse subjects: the economic evolution, the problem of the Indian, the problem of the land, the public instruction, the religious factor, regionalism vs. centralism, and a "process" or prosecution of the national literature. Additionally, the author thought to include an essay on the political and ideological evolution of Peru, but as the number of its pages seemed excessive, he planned to develop this subject in a separate book. He was also aware of his limitations, as he makes it clear that none of his essays were finished and that he would return to those topics. However, his untimely death two years later put an end to these plans. Beyond the successes or failures of the author in his goal of contributing to the socialist critique of the problems of Peru, this book had the merit of encouraging new work on the interpretation of the Peruvian reality and start the search for different conceptions that diverge from the traditional understanding.

== Content ==
=== Framework of the economic development in Peru ===
Mariátegui studies the economic evolution of Peru applying historical materialism, although not in a rigorous way. In summary, he affirms that the economic development of the Inca Empire, of a socialist type, was interrupted by the Spanish conquest. The Spaniards imposed a feudal economic structure that enforced slavery. This feudalism extends to the Republic, with the Latin American social issue gamonalismo while slavery is abolished. Gamonalismo or "bossism" (caciquismo or "large landowner") refers to the exploitation of indigenous communities by landowners of European descent. The national bourgeoisie (capitalist class) emerged during the period of guano and nitrate (nineteenth century) and began to strengthen at the beginning of the twentieth century, but without supplanting the landlord class or latifundia (semi-feudal). According to Mariátegui, in his time the three economies coexisted in Peru: the feudal, the bourgeois and some residues of the indigenous communist economy in the Sierra.

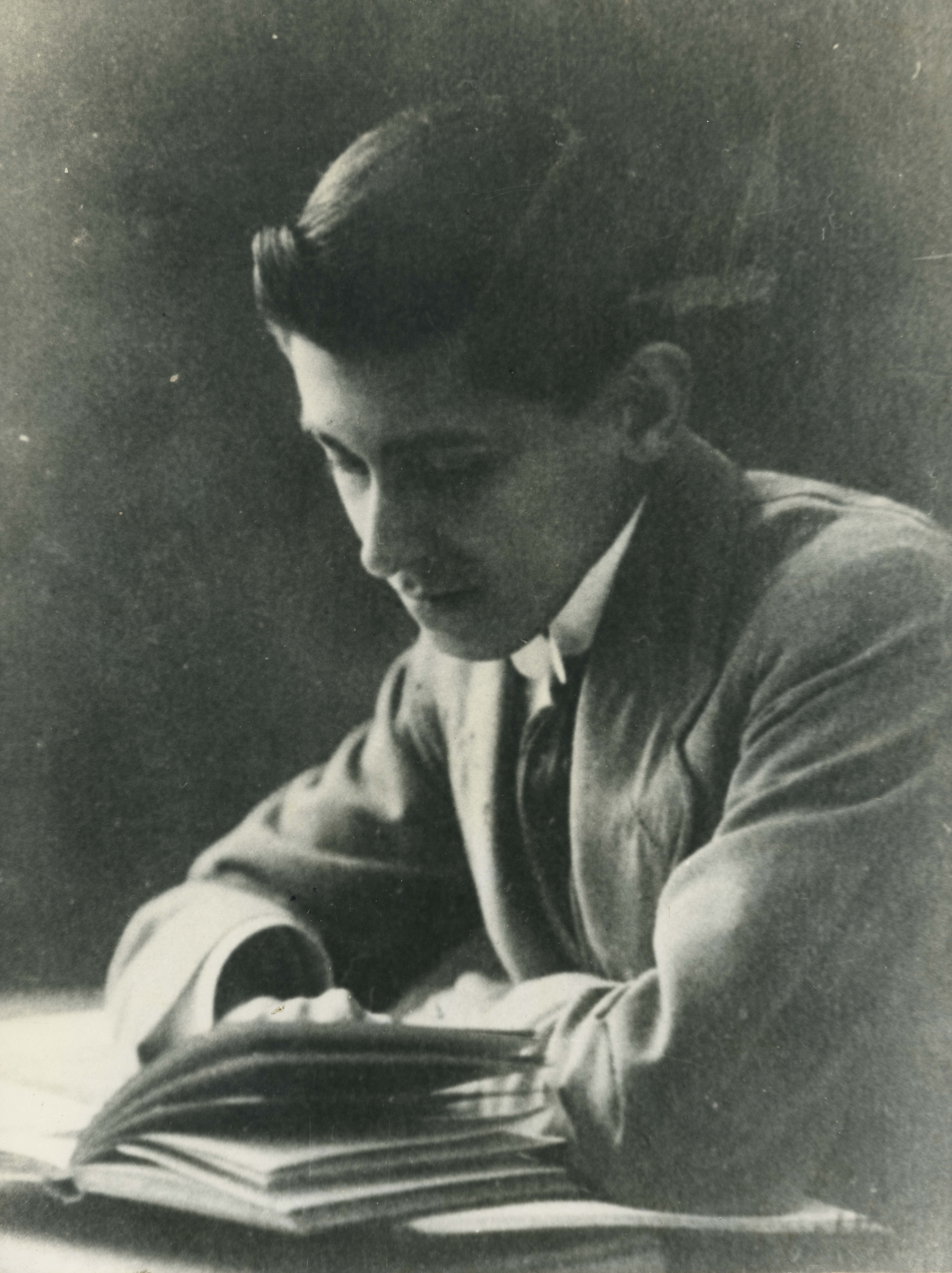
José Carlos Mariátegui in 1917

==== The colonial economy ====
Mariátegui praises the economic development of the Inca Empire, which he describes as "socialist" and "collectivist"; especially when highlighting the collective work that guaranteed the material well-being of the empire's entire population. This significant economic development was "split" (interrupted) by the Spanish conquest. The Spaniards destroyed the machinery of Inca production; then they embedded their political and economic structures. The socialist economy of the Incas was replaced by another feudal one. The Spaniards did not seek to develop a solid economy but solely aimed to exploit natural resources. The fundamental activity of the Spaniards was the exploitation of the gold and silver mines. When there was not enough labor for the work of the haciendas or "villages" of the coast, they resorted to the importation of black slaves; this is how they formed not only a feudal society but also a slave society. According to Mariátegui, the colonial economic structure remained as the historical basis of the Peruvian economy.

==== The economic bases of the republic ====
The second stage of the Peruvian economy is founded from another political and military event: Independence. This originates from the same policy of the Spanish Crown, which impeded the free economic development of the colonies. The Creole bourgeoisie, although still embryonic, began to adopt the revolutionary ideas of the European bourgeoisie and promoted independence to ensure its prosperity. Independence is then decided by the needs of capitalist development; in this sense, the United Kingdom, known as the birthplace of the free trade economy, played a fundamental role in supporting the developing American nations. The struggle for independence brought together the various Latin American nations, but once it was achieved, each one took its own path. The nations benefiting most from free trade, along with the rest of the world, were those located on the Atlantic side, specifically, Argentina and Brazil, which attracted immigrants and European capitals, which allowed those countries to strengthen bourgeois and liberal democracy; while Peru, due to its geographical position, did not receive that dynamic flow of immigration and limited itself to receiving Chinese immigrants, who went on to work in the haciendas or "villages" under the feudal, quasi-slave model. However, Peru needed "the machines, the methods and the ideas of the Europeans, of the Westerners".

==== The period of Guano and Saltpeter ====
Another chapter in Peruvian economic history opens with the discovery of the wealth of guano and saltpeter. Guano, also known as the excrement of seabirds and bats, is used as fertilizer. Saltpeter, a component known as Potassium nitrate, is used to preserve meat. These easily exploited products quickly increased the wealth of the State, since industrial Europe needed these resources to maintain its agricultural productivity. The riches that came from the exploitation of these products were squandered by the Peruvian State, but they allowed the appearance of commercial and banking capital. It began to constitute a capitalist class, but whose origin was in the old Peruvian aristocracy. Another consequence was the consolidation of the economic power of the coast since until then, the mining had configured the Peruvian economy a mountain character. In short, guano and saltpeter allowed the slow transformation of the Peruvian economy from a feudal system to a capitalist system, although the dependence on foreign capital continued to be accentuated. These riches were lost after the War of the Pacific.

==== Characteristics of the current economy ====
After the war with Chile, the post-war period opened with a period of the collapse of the productive forces. The currency was depreciated, and the foreign credit was canceled. The militarism born from defeat took power, but soon the old capitalist class that emerged in the days of guano and saltpeter resumed its place in the guidelines of national politics. To achieve economic resurgence, it was necessary to resort to the assistance of European investors. Due to the Grace Contract (1888) the railways were given to European bondholders as a pledge and guarantee of new investments in Peru. The operationalization of the railways in the central region activated large-scale mining in that region. Slowly, the Peruvian economy was recovering, with bases more solid than those of guano and saltpeter, but without losing its character as a colonial economy. In that line, the government of Nicolás de Piérola (1895–1899) was at the service of the interests of the plutocracy, according to Mariátegui's perception. Then, it lists the fundamental characteristics of the Peruvian economy of its time (towards 1928):

• The emergence of modern industry.

• The function of modern capital (emergence of banks).

• The shortening of distances and the increase in traffic between Peru, the United States, and Europe (opening of the Panama Canal).

• The gradual transition of European influence to American influence.

• The development of a capitalist class (bourgeoisie), which replaces the old aristocracy with viceregal surnames.

• The illusion of rubber

• The rise of Peruvian products in the world market, which generates a rapid growth of the national private fortune.

• The borrowing policy was distinct for its time (Oncenio de Leguía). The main creditors are the bankers of the United States.

Mariátegui concludes by pointing out that in his time three economies still coexisted in Peru: the feudal, the bourgeois, and the remaining part of the indigenous communist economy in the Sierra.

==== Agrarian economy and feudal "latifundismo" ====
Despite the increase in mining activity since the late nineteenth century, Peru maintained its status as an agricultural country. The vast majority of the population was engaged in agriculture. The Indian, who made up four-fifths of that population, was traditionally a farmer. The agriculture of food products was concentrated in the mountains and supplied the national market. Agroindustrial crops destined for export (sugar cane and cotton) were concentrated on the coast and were under the control of the landowning class. This maintained a semi-feudal organization that stood as the heaviest obstacle to the development of the country. According to Mariátegui, the Creole owner, due to his Spanish heritage and training, could not fully develop a capitalist economy. The author's interest in the complete development of capitalism in Peru was due to the fact that, according to the communist ideology, this phase was necessary for the emergence of the socialist revolution.

=== The problem of the Indian ===
==== His new approach ====
Mariátegui conceived the problem of the Indian not as a racial, administrative, legal, educational or ecclesiastical issue, but as a substantial economic problem whose origin was in the unjust system of land ownership concentrated in a few hands (gamonalismo or latifundismo); as long as this form of property subsisted, any attempt to solve the Indian's problem would be unsuccessful. The gamonalismo was opposed successfully to all law or ordinance of indigenous protection. The hacendado, latifundista, or gamonal was practically a feudal lord. In front of him, the law was impotent. The Republic had prohibited free labor, but even so, free labor, and even forced labor, survived on the latifundio.

==== A brief historical review ====
It is estimated that the population of the Inca Empire was ten million inhabitants. The Spanish conquest was a tremendous butchery; the native population was decimated. The viceroyalty established a regime of brutal exploitation. The Spanish imposed the feudal regime of land tenure and gave more importance to the extraction of gold and silver. The indigenous population was subjected to an overwhelming system of forced labor, in mines and sawmills. The coast was depopulated, thus black slaves were imported for the work of the haciendas. The Spanish destroyed society and the Inca economy, without replacing it with another economy of equal performance. The system they established was a feudal system dependent on slave labor. The independence revolution was led by the Creole and even by some Spaniards, who took advantage of the support of the indigenous masses. The liberal agenda of the revolution included the redemption of the Indian, but when independence was consummated, it remained only as a promise. This is because the landed aristocracy of the colony, or owner of power, kept intact their feudal rights over the land. The situation of the Indian worsened during the period of the Republic. In the Sierra or "mountain range", the region inhabited mainly by the Indians, Mariátegui's time subsisted the most barbarous and omnipotent feudality. The domain of the land was in the hands of the gamonales or latifundistas. However, the propagation of socialist ideas gave rise to a strong movement of vindication among the indigenous masses. "The solution of the Indian problem has to be a social solution. Its makers must be the Indians themselves. This concept leads to a historical event at the meeting of the indigenous congresses. The indigenous congresses, distorted in recent years by bureaucratism, did not yet represent a program; but their first meetings indicated a mode of communication to the Indians of different regions. The Indians lack national ties. Their protests have always been regional. This has contributed, in large part, to his [the Indian] depression," concludes Mariátegui.

=== The problem of the land ===
In general terms:

• Colonialism amounted to feudalism.

• The politics of colonialism led to depopulation and slavery, to ethnocide.

• The Spanish colonizer as an exploiter was more interested in extracting gold and silver, contrary to the Northern European colonizers of North America, which were known as creators of wealth.

• The agrarian policy was accentuated negatively in the Republic. Haciendas or "villages" emerged that expanded and in turn affected the lands of indigenous communities.

• Political power was held by the landowners (hacendados or latifundistas), from the parliament and the ministries.

• A stunted indigenous community coexisted with a buoyant latifundismo influence; both in the Sierra and on the industrialized coast.

• Concludes with final propositions.

==== The agrarian problem and the Indian problem ====
Mariátegui says that "the question of the Indian, more than pedagogical is economic, is social". The liquidation of feudalism in Peru should have been carried out by the demo-bourgeois regime established after independence. However, this did not happen because there was no real capitalist class in Peru. The old feudal class, disguised as a republican bourgeoisie, kept its positions. There were two expressions of surviving feudalism: Latifundio and Servitude. The servitude that weighed on the indigenous class could not be freed if the latifundium was not finished first. The agrarian problem thus appeared, in all its magnitude, as a socio-economic problem, and therefore, a political one.

==== Colonialism – feudalism ====
In the Middle Ages (inquisition, feudalism, etc.), Spain brought to Peru the Counter-Reformation. In the majority of these institutions, the Peruvians were painfully liberating themselves. But the economic foundation, that is, the feudal inheritance remained after the independent revolution. The Creole ruling class, which succeeded the Spanish one, did not change the socio-economic structures of the colonial regime. The regime of land ownership determined the political and administrative regime of the entire nation. On a semi-feudal economy, neither democratic nor liberal institutions could prosper nor function. The Inca people were an agrarian civilization ("life comes from the land" was their motto). He lived dedicated to agriculture and herding. The fundamental characters of the Inca economy were the following:

• Collective ownership of arable land.

• Collective ownership of waters, forests, grasslands.

• Common cooperation at work

• Individual appropriation of crops and fruits.

The colonial regime disorganized and annihilated the Inca agrarian economy, without replacing it with an economy of higher yields. But not only did that but it reduced the indigenous population through ethnocide.

==== Politics of colonialism: depopulation and slavery ====
Mariátegui observes that the Spanish colonial regime proved incapable of developing an economy of pure feudal type in Peru and that it engrafted elements of the slave economy into its structure. The Spanish colonizer, who had not developed the idea of the economic value of man, established a policy of depopulation, that entailed the extermination of the indigenous mass (ethnocide). The time came when the Spaniards needed labor and then resorted to the importation of black slaves, thus bringing slavery. However, the Indians practically suffered a slave regime, because the preferred activity of the Spaniards, mining, was ensued through slave labor. In that sense, the Spaniards established the mining Mita, a system of work supposedly inspired by the Inca mita, but which was nothing but a form of slavery in which many indigenous people were subjected. "Mita" means "forced labor". In Mariátegui's time, the colonial character of coastal agriculture came largely from the slave system. This is because the coastal landowner searched for labor to cultivate their lands. Thousands of Indians went down to the coastal haciendas, where they labored as pawns in the worst conditions.

==== The Spanish colonizer ====
Mariátegui compares the Spanish colonizer with the Northern European one. The Spanish did not have the conditions of the "pioneer" colonizers. He thought that the riches of Peru were his precious metals. Thus, with the practice of mita or "forced labor", they annihilated human capital, bringing the decline of agriculture. The Spanish colonizer was never a creator of wealth, compared to the Anglo-Saxon.

==== The revolution of independence and agrarian property ====
The revolution of independence, not having been led by the indigenous masses, had no agrarian claims. It was directed and financed by the criollos (merchant bourgeoisie), who were more interested in defending their commercial interests. Although the republican government abolished mita (forced labor), encomiendas (entrustment), etc., the landed aristocracy continued to be the dominant class.

==== Agrarian policy of the republic ====
The Republic tried to legislate with an aim to strengthen small individual property, according to the current form of liberalism. This amounted to dismantling both the latifundio (large estate) and the indigenous community. However, this intention did not prosper. The latifundio (estate) was consolidated and extended, while the indigenous community was the most affected, both by the ambition of the landlords and by the unwise policy directed from the capital.

==== The great property and the political power ====
The political class of the Republic had power over the ownership of the land (latifundia feudalism). Politicians and tyrants were usually owners of large estates. While the provincial communities maintained a very limited advancement in its production system, the coastal provinces catered to the interests of foreign merchants, and were more technologically developed, although its exploitation still rested on feudal practices and principles.

==== The "community" under the republic ====
Although the tendency in the Republic was to diminish the indigenous community with the intent to give way to individual properties. However, there were no policies established in this regard. The community survived, albeit with difficulty. Then, an intellectual of liberal tendency like Manuel Vicente Villarán claimed the protection of the communities against agrarian exploitation. However, the most consistent defense would come from socialist intellectuals such as Hildebrando Castro Pozo, author of the interesting study Our indigenous community.

==== The "community" and the latifundio (agrarian exploitation) ====
The defense of the indigenous community, assumed by many thinkers such as Castro Pozo, did not rest on abstract principles of justice or traditionalist sentimentality, but on concrete economic and social reasons. The comparison of the latifundio serrano with the indigenous community as an agricultural production enterprise, disadvantaged the first.

==== The work regime – servitude and "salaried" ====
When the feudal latifundio survived in Peru, bondage also survived, under various forms and different names. The difference between the agriculture of the coast and the mountains, was that the first had a more developed technical level, but no more. Both continued to have feudal or semi-feudal character. Applied feudal methods were the yanaconazgo and the "enganche". The yanaconazgo consisted of a peasant or yanacona working in the lands of a landowner, receiving a part of the production in exchange for his work. The hitch was a system applied on the coast, by which workers or braceros were hired by giving cash advances, but in general, that debt tended to grow, leaving the worker practically tied to the contract, without being able to have his freedom. On the coast, the land worker was, in addition to the Indian, the black slave and Chinese coolie. In the mountains, exclusively the Indian. The coastal landowner admitted, although very attenuated, the regime of salary and free labor. On the other hand, in the Sierra, the power of the landowner was practically absolute and maintained feudalism in its entirety.

==== Colonialism of our coastal agriculture ====
The development of the agroindustrial crop of the Peruvian coast (sugarcane and cotton) was due to the interest of foreign capital in these products. The best valleys on the coast were planted with cane and cotton and formed immense latifundia, while food crops occupied a much smaller area and were run by small landowners and ranchers. All this, despite the fact that the soil of Peru did not produce everything that the population needed for its subsistence and it was necessary to import wheat. Problem that was not resolved by the State, more striving to make a policy of subsistence. That shows that the economy of Peru is a colonial economy, because its movement and its development were subordinated to the interests and needs of the great powers.

==== Final proposals ====
1. The character of agrarian property in Peru is presented as one of the greatest obstacles to the development of national capitalism.

2. The large estate in Peru is the most serious barrier to white or European immigration, because it is not attractive because of its low wages and its almost slave system.

3. The orientation of coastal agriculture to the interests of foreign capitals (agro-export) prevents the testing and adoption of new crops of national necessity.

4. The agrarian property of the coast is unable to meet the problems of rural health.

5. In the mountains, surviving agrarian feudalism is completely inept as a creator of wealth and progress. The latifundios have miserable production.

6. The reason that this situation of the highland latifundia was not only due to the difficulty of communications, but more than anything to the gamonalismo (caciquismo latifundista).

=== The process of public instruction ===
==== The colonial heritage and the french and north american influences ====
The revolution of Independence adopted the egalitarian principles of revolutionary France, but only in the favor of the Creoles. The nascent Republic inherited the colonial structures and did little to change that situation in its early years. In the middle of the 19th century, the French model began to be adopted. But this model also had many deficiencies, because it also accentuated the literary and rhetorical orientation of teaching. The Anglo-Saxon influence began to be reflected in the reform of the second teaching of 1902. It was Dr. Manuel Vicente Villarán who most vigorously defended the adoption of the North American model, aimed at the training of businessmen and not only of literati or scholars. that was consistent with the nascent development of Peruvian capitalism. Villarán preached triumphed with the educational reform of 1920, through the organic law of education given that year, but as it was not possible, according to Mariátegui "democratize the education of a country, without democratizing its economy, and without democratizing, therefore, its political superstructure"the 1920 reform became a failure.

==== The university reform ====
• Ideology and Demands.- The university reform deserves the special attention of Mariátegui. The student movement in demand for university reform emerged in Córdoba, Argentina, in 1918, encouraged by the world crisis caused by the First World War. Other outbreaks that arose in Chile, Uruguay, Peru, had the same origin and the same impulse. The students of America wanted to shake off the old structures of their Universities, that is, to reform the antiquated methodology of studies and the university government. Their basic demands were the following: – the need for students to intervene in the government of the universities, and – the functioning of free chairs, alongside the official chairs. These free chairs should be diffusers of new and alternative knowledge. In short, they wanted the University to stop being an organ of a privileged group and to be more oriented towards the national reality of each country. The connection of the students with the workers' protests, in vogue then, gave a revolutionary character to the University reform.

• Politics and University Education in Latin America.- The economic and political regime determined by the predominance of colonial aristocracies had placed the universities of Latin America under the tutelage of those oligarchies and their clientele. Having converted university education into a privilege of money and class, the universities had fallen into academic bureaucratization. This inevitably led to spiritual and scientific impoverishment. In Peru, this phenomenon occurred due to the survival of the semi-feudal economic structure, but it also happened in Argentina, despite being a more industrialized and democratized country. The movement of university reform in Latin America necessarily had to attack the root of evil. At the same time, the conservative oligarchies had to react against the reform.

• The University of Lima.- According to Mariátegui, the spirit of the Colony has had its home in the University. The main reason has been the prolongation of survival of the domain of the old colonial aristocracy, throughout the Republic. The University remained, in general, faithful to the scholastic tradition, conservative and Spanish; this prevented him from fulfilling a progressive and creative role in national life. Mariátegui agrees with the teacher Víctor Andrés Belaunde, in the sense that the University was divorced from the national reality but accuses Belaunde of not wanting to look for the deep reasons of that truth, for being linked to the "feudal caste". For Mariátegui it was clear the reason for this failure of the University: the persistence of the colony in the economic-social structure of Peru. It also accuses the "futurist generation" (Generation of the 900), headed by the thinker José de la Riva Agüero and Osma, of not having initiated the renovation of the methods and the spirit of the University, for being its members of conservative tendency and traditionalist.

• Reform and Reaction - Mariátegui gives us an extensive study on the university reform in Peru and the reaction against it (it is advisable to read it completely). The Peruvian student movement of 1919 was originally a rebellion against some inept professors who had stagnated in teaching. The students began by making a picture where they crossed out those teachers. But the rectorship showed solidarity with those teachers crossed out. The students understood then that the oligarchical nature of teaching and bureaucratization and the stagnation of teaching were two aspects of the same problem. The student demands were expanded and specified at that time. In 1919 the student claims triumphed. The president Augusto B. Leguía gave a decree by which the free chairs and the representation of the students in the government of the University were established. In March 1920 the First National Congress of Students met in Cuzco, where the creation of Popular Universities was approved. But among the Peruvian students, there was profound disorientation, which seriously affected the continuation of the reform. In 1920, a decree of the government recognized the autonomy of the University, which left the teaching satisfied. Due to this, part of the conquests of the student body was ignored. Moreover, when Dr. Manuel Vicente Villarán took over the rector of the University of San Marcos (1922–1924), a period of collaboration between teaching and students began, which prevented the renewal of the struggle for reform. For Mariátegui, the lack of great student drivers made the University Reform stagnant. The only exception was perhaps at the University of Cuzco, where the faculty's elite accepted and sanctioned the principles proposed by the students.

==== Contrasting ideologies ====
In this final section of the essay, the author exposes the two ideological positions that they debated about the educational model that was to be imposed in Peru, at the beginning of the 20th century. These ideologies were developed within the Civil Party, the predominant in Peruvian politics at the time and were the following:

• The program of bourgeois and positivist civilism, expressed by Manuel Vicente Villarán, and

• The program of feudal and idealistic civilism, defended by Alejandro Deustua.

Villarán defended the North American model, with a practical orientation (formation of businessmen), which was consistent with the nascent capitalism that was being formed in Peru. While Deustua raised the educational problem in a purely philosophical field; to say Mariátegui, represented the old aristocratic mentality of the latifundista caste. Finally, the Villarán program was imposed, but with mediocre results. In conclusion, for Mariátegui, "the problem of teaching cannot be well understood in our time if it is not considered as an economic problem and as a social problem. The error of many reformers has been in their abstractly idealistic method, in their exclusively pedagogical doctrine".

=== The religious factor ===
==== The religion in the tahuantinsuyo ====
Mariátegui begins by pointing out that in his time, the concept of religion had already grown in extension and depth. The old criticism of anticlericalism (atheist, secular and rationalist) of relating religiosity with obscurantism was already overcome (which does not prevent that still some, naively or ignorantly, continue to believe in that relationship). He uses Anglo-Saxon Protestantism as an example to deny such an assertion. Mariátegui notes that the religious factor offers very complex aspects in the peoples of the Americas. The study of it must necessarily start from the beliefs of the pre-Columbian peoples. He considers that there are enough elements on the mythology of ancient Peru to place his place in the religious evolution of humanity. According to Mariátegui, the Inca religion was a moral code rather than a set of metaphysical abstractions. It was subordinated to the social and political interests of the Empire, rather than purely spiritual ends. The high priestly class belonged at the same time to the ruling class. It is what is called Theocracy. That is why when the Incas conquered other peoples, they did not aim to extirpate the diversity of cults (with the exception of those too barbarous or violent), but, with a practical sense, they demanded only the supremacy of the cult of the Sun. Sol or Coricancha thus became the temple of somewhat federal mythology. That same theocratic regime explains that the Inca Church (to call it somehow) perished along with the Inca State during the Spanish conquest. But the agrarian rites, the magical practices, and the pantheistic feeling survived in the population.

==== The Catholic conquest ====
According to Mariátegui, the Spanish conquest was the last crusade, that is, an essentially military and religious enterprise, carried out jointly by soldiers and missionaries (the sword and the cross). After the conquest, colonialism began, which is a political and ecclesiastical enterprise. The Viceroyalty attracts noble lawyers and ecclesiastical doctors. The Inquisition and the Counter-Reformation arrive, but also all the cultural activity, concentrated in the hands of the Catholic Church. The University was founded by the friars. The sumptuous liturgy of Catholicism and the poignant style of the preachers captivated the indigenous masses, more than the evangelical doctrine itself. That is to say, for the Indians, the most attractive feature of the Catholic cult was its exteriority and not its interiority. The Indian, in fact, kept his old magical beliefs adapting them to Catholic worship, a phenomenon known as religious syncretism. The role of the Catholic Church during the viceroyalty was to support and justify the instituted feudal and semi-feudal state. Although there were clashes between the civil power and the ecclesiastical power, these had no doctrinal background but were simple domestic disputes, which were eventually overcome.

==== Independence and the church ====
With the advent of the Republic, there was no change. The revolution of Independence, in the same way, that it did not touch the feudal privileges, neither did it with the ecclesiastics. The high clergy initially showed loyalty to the Spanish monarchy, but like the landowning aristocracy, it accepted the Republic when it saw that it maintained the colonial structures. Among the lower clergy, there were many who actively militated on the patriot side. Although among the Peruvian patriots there were those who professed liberalism, it never reached the extremes of anti-clerical Jacobinism, as happened in France. Peruvian liberalism, weak and formal in economic and political terms, was also in the religious. There was no more incisive campaign by the Peruvian Liberals in favor of secularism and other demands of anti-clericalism. The personal performance of Francisco de Paula González Vigil, a clergyman famous for his criticism of the Roman Curia, did not belong properly to liberalism. The most conspicuous Peruvian Liberal leader, José Gálvez Egúsquiza, respected and fulfilled the dogmas of the Catholic Church. The radicalism of Manuel González Prada emerged in the late nineteenth century was the first anticlerical agitation of Peru but lacked effectiveness for not having provided a socio-economic program. According to the socialist thesis, ecclesiastical forms and religious doctrines are proper and inseparable from the economic-social regime that sustains and produces them, and therefore, the primary concern should be to change said regime, rather than assuming anticlerical attitudes.

=== Regionalism and centralism ===
When the Peruvian Republic emerged, it was constituted under the centralist system, despite the proposals of federalism made by some liberal ideologues. In the time of Mariátegui, the problem of political centralization remained in force; Naturally, for him, the solution to this problem necessarily had to cover the social and economic level, and not just the political and administrative one, as had been attempted.

==== Basic papers ====
For Mariátegui, the problem of regionalism versus centralism was already posed in new terms, leaving behind the old concepts of the 19th century. He recognized the existence, especially in southern Peru, of a regionalist sentiment, but noted that such regionalism seemed to be "a vague expression of discomfort and discontent." List the following propositions:

1. The old controversy between federalists and centrists of the early days of the Republic was already overcome. The political and administrative controversy had to be transferred to the social and economic plane.

2. Federalism does not appear in Peruvian history as popular demand but as demand for gamonalismo and its clientele.

3. The centralism is based on the regional caciquismo and gamonalismo (willing, nevertheless, to claim federalism according to the circumstances), while federalism recruits its followers among caciques and gamonales in disgrace before the central power.

4. One of the vices of political organization is certainly centralism. But the solution does not lie in feudal federalism.

5. It is difficult to define and demarcate in Peru historically existing regions as such. The division of Peru into departments is a continuation of the artificial division into intendancies of the Viceroyalty.

During the Republic, the first organized political parties admitted decentralization into their programs, but they never developed it when they came to power, leaving this idea in simple theoretical speculation.

== Reception ==
=== Praise ===
The former leader of the Peruvian Communist Party (PCP) during the Peruvian Revolution, Abimael Guzmán, has praised Seven Interpretive Essays on Peruvian Reality and Mariátegui's works. In the late 1960s at a conference at the University of San Cristobal de Humanga in Ayacucho, Peru, Guzmán praised Mariátegui's Seven Interpretive Essays, declaring it to be "an unshakable document" and that it "is still very much alive." Marc Becker, a professor of Latin American Studies at Truman State University, also praised Seven Interpretive Essays in his book José Carlos Mariátegui: An Anthology. Becker states that "Mariátegui presents a brilliant analysis of Peruvian, and by extension Latin American, problems from a Marxist point of view."

=== Criticism ===
The critical thinker Víctor Andrés Belaunde wrote a response to Seven Interpretive Essays on Peruvian Reality, entitled La Realidad Nacional (The National Reality), where he pointed out many errors and omissions of Mariátegui. Belaunde, a defender of Catholic thought with progressive social tendencies, wanted to raise an open debate with Mariátegui, but his death in 1930 prevented him from doing so. Juan Carlos Grijalva, a Spanish professor from Assumption College, stated in his article Paradoxes of the Inka Utopianism of José Carlos Mariátegui's Seven Interpretive Essays on Peruvian Reality that Mariátegui's argument that indigenous communalism is essential for communism is contradictory. Grijavla argues that Mariátegui' "idealizes" the past Inkan civilizations, and says that Mariátegui assumed that "the revolutionary Indians imagined by Mariátegui were ficticiously [sic?] considered as immutable and unalterable in their ancestral agrarian traditions."
