= Manuel Moral y Vega =

Portuguese photographer and publisher

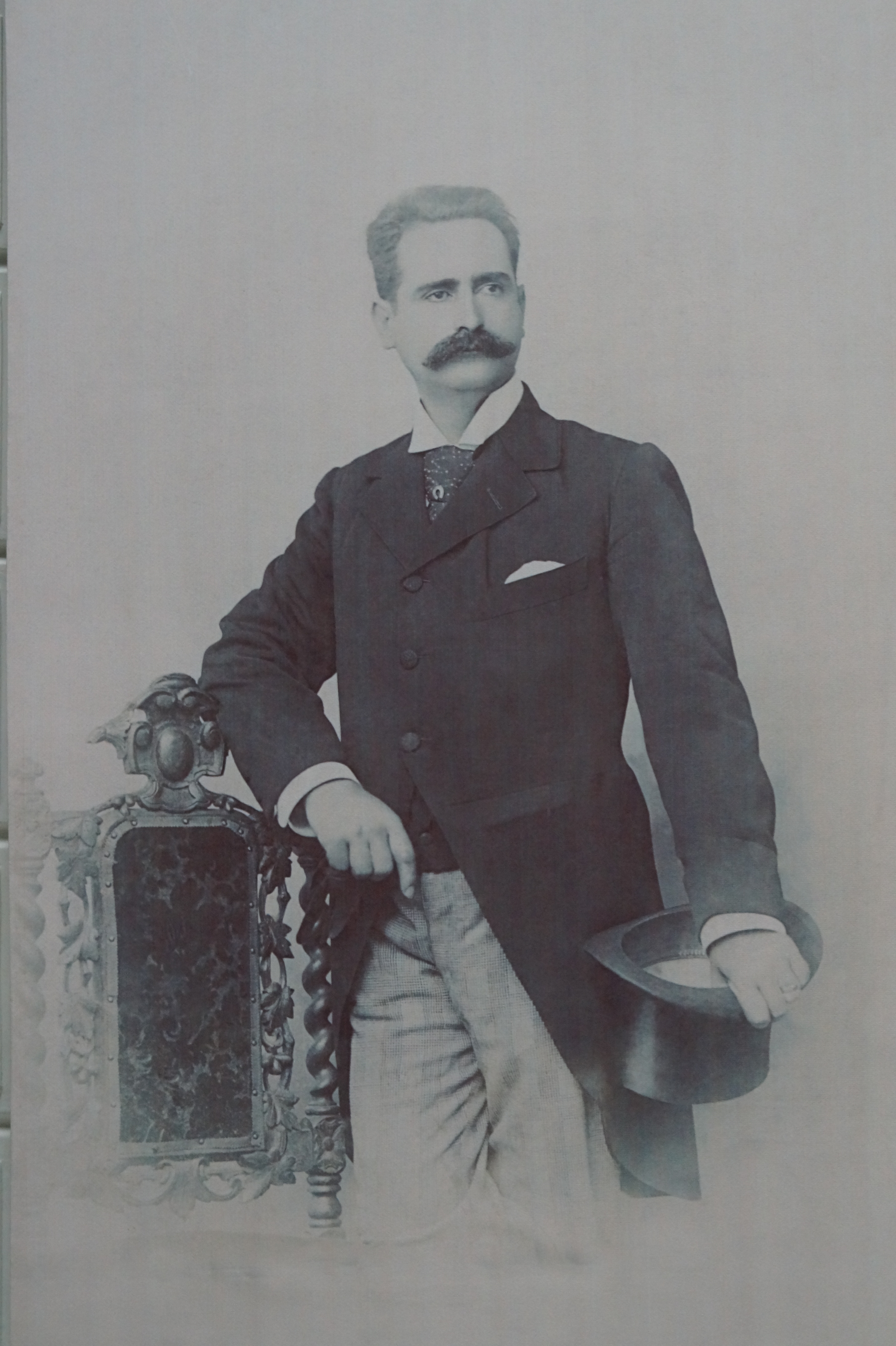
- Born: Manuel Augusto Moral da Veiga; March 16, 1865; Faro, Portugal
- Died: November 7, 1913 (aged 48); Lima, Peru
- Other names: Moral, M. Moral
- Occupations: Photographer, publisher
- Notable work: Variedades, La Crónica

Manuel Augusto Moral da Veiga (16 March 1865 - 7 November 1913), also known as Manuel Moral y Vega or simply as Moral, was a Portuguese photographer and publisher. He was active in early twentieth-century Peru, where he is considered the "father of Peruvian photojournalism."

In Peru, he was involved in the publication of Prisma (1905 - June 1907), Variedades (a weekly launched 10 March 1908 and the former's successor) and, later, La Crónica. He maintained photographic studios in Callao and Central Lima.

== Biography ==
Moral was born in Faro, Portugal, in 1865. He reached Peru in 1883, establishing himself in Callao, at No. 17 of Calle La Misión, until 1900. He quickly established a commercial relationship with Scottish photographer William T. Mason, who served as his mentor. After becoming a specialist in his trade, he routinely travelled to the United States and Europe to acquire photographic material to distribute. Like other photographers of his time, he also travelled to Peru's interior regions, where he offered his services. From February to August 1898, he maintained a stable study in Arequipa. In 1903, he inaugurated his studio at Calle Mantas, in central Lima. He was a collaborator for a number of magazines, such as El Monitor Popular, Actualidades and El Lucero.

In 1905, Moral, alongside collaborators Federico Larrañaga and Julio S. Hernández, established Prisma, an illustrated magazine. Hernández was a political acquaintance of Larrañaga—himself a journalist and founder of El Canal during his time as consul in Panama—and owner of the printing company of newspaper El País, already defunct at the time. Moral and Larrañaga established a mutual society that ceased to exist when the latter left in 1906, and the magazine continued to be published until 1907, when it was replaced by Variedades the following year.

He died in Lima on November 7, 1913. In 1916, photographer Luis S. Ugarte purchased the studio's inventory, serving as Moral's successor and superimposing a signature of his own in several of Moral's photographs.

== See also ==
- Mundial (magazine)
- Eugenio Courret
