= Mundial (magazine) =

Peruvian magazine

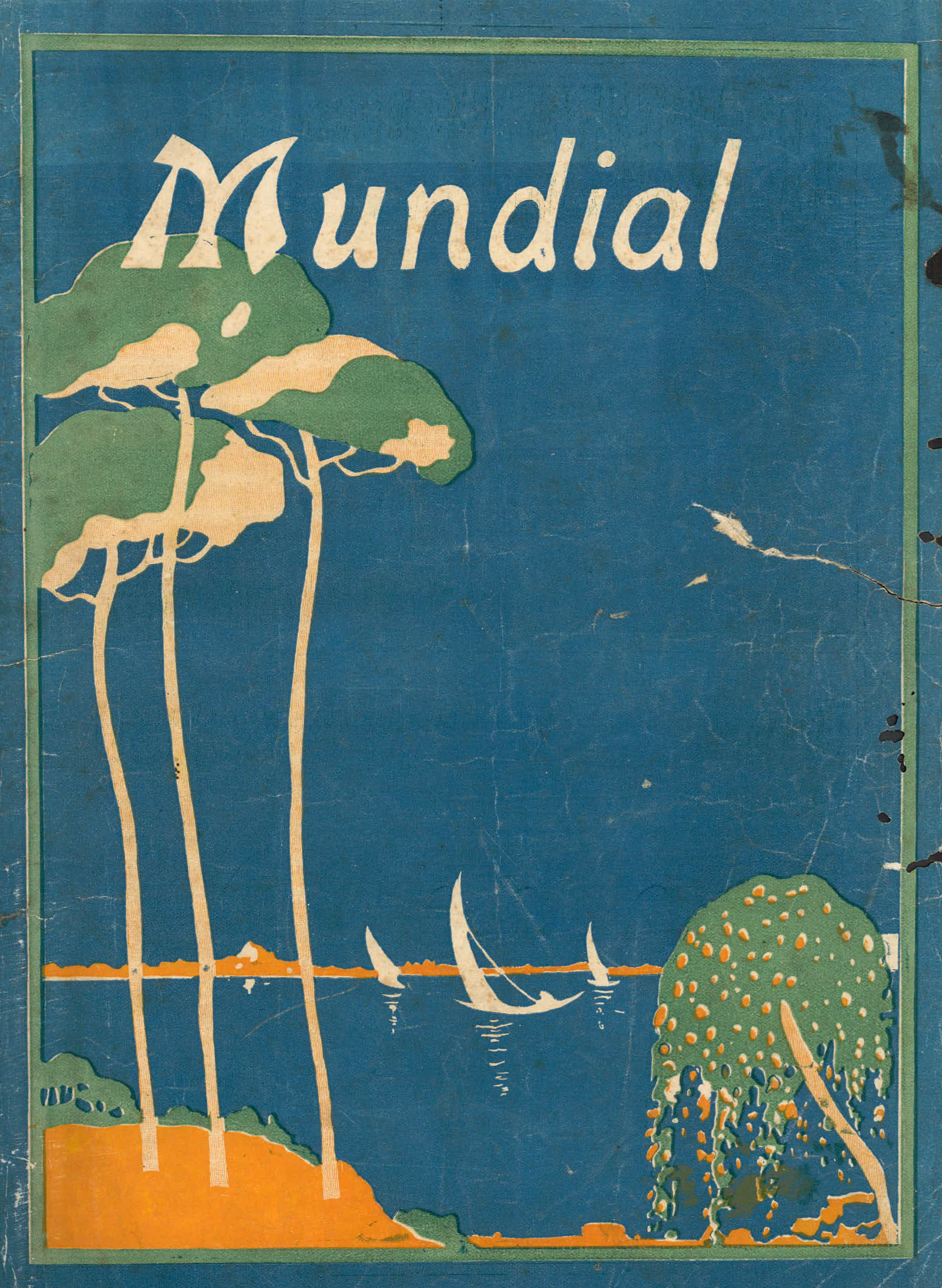
- First issue cover
- Editor: Several
- Frequency: Weekly
- Founder: Andrés Aramburú Salinas
- First issue: April 28, 1920
- Final issue Number: September 4, 1931; 576
- Country: Peru

Mundial was a Peruvian weekly magazine. It was one of the publications that marked the birth of modern journalism in Peru, both for its graphic design and its content when it appeared in Lima on April 28, 1920. It reached up to number 576, corresponding to 4 September 1931. Its director was Andrés Aramburú Salinas and it was printed on the site of the La Opinión Nacional, a publishing house on Calle Mantas 152.

== Overview ==
It had three well-defined areas:

- A mundane, sometimes frivolous section of the life of Lima's high society.
- A political section, with opinions that varied depending on the circumstances, although generally committed to the achievements of the government of Augusto B. Leguía.
- A section with intellectual content, which gave it more prestige.

Its cover was of great graphic quality, printed in fine colors. Generally he reproduced, in trichrome, some artistic work, preferably those that had just been exhibited in an exhibition. The rest of its pages also had graphic reproductions of contemporary events, as well as collaborations from prominent writers of all tendencies.

== Collaborators ==
The following collaborated permanently:

- José Carlos Mariátegui
- César Vallejo
- Luis Alberto Sánchez
- Jorge Guillermo Leguía
- Enrique A. Carrillo
- Darío Eguren Larrea
- Ladislao Meza
- José Chioino
- Humberto del Águila
- Clodoaldo López Merino
- Ricardo Vegas García
- César Guillermo Corzo
- Federico Mould Távara
- Dora Mayer
- Edgardo Rebagliati
- Alejandro Belaunde
- María Isabel Sánchez-Concha
- María Wiesse
- Jorge Vinatea Reynoso

Among them stand out: José Carlos Mariátegui, who made known through Mundial his famous Seven Interpretive Essays on Peruvian Reality, before publishing them as an organic book; Luis Alberto Sánchez, who published numerous literary essays; César Vallejo, who from Europe sent his chronicles that covered the most diverse cultural and political topics of the Old World; Jorge Vinatea Reynoso, with the well-made caricatures of him; Humberto del Águila, with his "letters from Rucio", political comments in Cervantes' style.

Other collaborators include:

- José Santos Chocano
- José Gálvez Barrenechea
- Raúl Porras Barrenechea
- Percy Gibson Möller
- Jorge Basadre
- Aurelio Miró Quesada
- Enrique Peña Barrenechea
- Ricardo Peña Barrenechea
- Martín Adán
- Xavier Abril
- Catalina Recavarren
- Estuardo Núñez

== Journalism ==
Its director captured a modern conception of journalism in its pages. Starting with the visual aspect, he gave importance to the graphic element in the information, many of them with engravings in fine colors and trichomes. Since then, the elaborate graphic design became the fundamental characteristic of Peruvian journalism.

The modernity of the weekly resided not only in the form, but also in the sensationalist content. a method that revolutionised world journalism since the end of the 19th century, with Joseph Pulitzer and William Randolph Hearst as standard bearers. Without falling into the questionable methods of the yellow press, Mundial knew how to take advantage of that contribution, incorporating sensational and current sections, within a broader content, where opinion, satire and political caricature, interviews, social and labor pages, criticism of shows, literature, etc.

== Closure ==
At the end of 1930, Aramburú began a campaign for humanitarian treatment to be given to the overthrown and imprisoned president Augusto B. Leguía, because his advanced age and delicate state of health demanded it. As expected, this campaign was maliciously distorted and led to political retaliation against Aramburú by the government of Luis Miguel Sánchez Cerro. Aramburú was put on trial and even suffered imprisonment, ending up dying shortly after in exile in Chile.

When the weekly newspaper closed in 1931, its archives became one of the most important graphic records of the events that marked the history of the 1920s in Peru and the world, as well as a valuable collection of articles, chronicles and essays from the Peruvian intellectuality of that time.

== See also ==
- Variedades

== Bibliography ==
- Basadre, Jorge (2005). Historia de la República del Perú: 8.º periodo: El comienzo de la irrupción de las masas organizadas en la política (1930-1933). Vol. 16 (9th ed.). Lima: Empresa Editora El Comercio S. A. ISBN 9972-205-78-9.
- Garavito Amézaga, Hugo: Mundial y el periodismo moderno. Publicado en el suplemento dominical de El Comercio. Lima, 11 de diciembre de 1983.
- Tauro del Pino, Alberto: Enciclopedia Ilustrada del Perú. Tercera Edición. Tomo 11. Lima, PEISA, 2001. ISBN 9972-40-166-9
