= Marc Becker =

American academic (born 1962)

Marc Becker (born 1962) is an American academic, professor of Latin American Studies at Truman State University.

He is a co-founder of NativeWeb, an internet resource that compiles information about Indigenous peoples around the world. He has published two books and several articles on José Carlos Mariátegui. Currently most of his academic work is on Indigenous movements in Ecuador.

Becker was mentioned in the rightwing tome The Professors: The 101 Most Dangerous Academics in America because he worked as an organizer for Historians Against the War, a group which opposed the United States' war in Iraq.
