= Hildebrando Castro Pozo =

Peruvian sociologist and politician

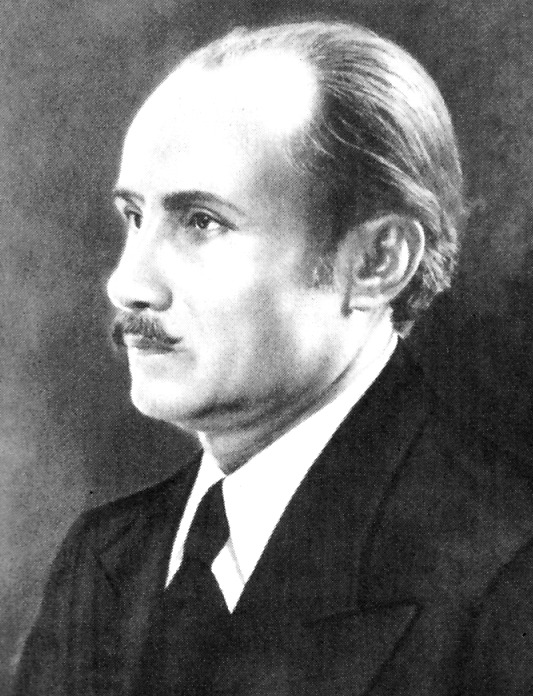
Hildebrando Castro Pozo

Hildebrando Castro Pozo (1890–1945) was a Peruvian sociologist and politician.

== Biography ==
The son of Santiago Castro and Flora Pozo, Castro Pozo began his secondary education at the Instituto de Piura, but before completing it, he left home and traveled to Panama, where he lived for five years (1904–1909), working in various trades. Upon returning to Peru, he moved to Lima, completed his schooling, and entered the Universidad Nacional Mayor de San Marcos in 1911.

To support himself, he worked as a teacher. He taught at the Instituto Lima (1911–1916) and at the Colegio Nacional San José de Jauja (1916–1918). He later joined the Ministry of Development (Ministerio de Fomento), first as an assistant in the Statistics Section of the Agricultural Directorate (1918–1919), then in the Labor Section, and finally as head of the Indigenous Affairs Section (1920–1923). In that role, he promoted the organization of the Tahuantinsuyo Indigenous Congresses. This experience was instrumental in shaping his intellectual development, as it allowed him to gather valuable information on land issues and the conditions of Indigenous Peruvians, adding to insights gained from his own experiences in the Andean highlands and coastal regions.

As a student, Castro Pozo participated in university groups advocating for the eight-hour workday. In 1919, he earned a bachelor's degree in jurisprudence with a thesis titled “The Sociological-Legal Problem of Indigenous Communities.”

In 1923, for opposing the reelection of President Augusto B. Leguía, he was exiled to Hamburg, but managed to disembark in Panama, where he taught in various schools. In April 1924, he boldly returned to Peru and was imprisoned. After his release, he earned his law degree in 1925. To keep him away from the capital, the government appointed him professor at the Colegio Nacional San Miguel de Piura (1925–1931).

He was a founding member of the Socialist Party established by Luciano Castillo Colonna in 1930—a political group created in response to Eudocio Ravines, who had changed the name of the party founded by José Carlos Mariátegui in 1928 from "Socialist" to "Communist." In 1931, he was elected deputy for Piura to the Constituent Congress of 1931, which remained in session until 1936.

He later taught at the Colegio Nacional Nuestra Señora de Guadalupe (1940–1944) and served as a technical advisor to the Directorate of Indigenous Affairs in the Ministry of Justice and Labor (1942–1944).

== Personal life ==
Castro Pozo's grandson, Manolo Forno, is a LGBT rights activist and writer.

== Works ==
=== Fiction ===
- Celajes de sierra (1923), short stories.
- Renuevo de peruanidad (1934), novel.

=== Essays ===
- Nuestra comunidad indígena (1924 and 1979)
- Del ayllu al cooperativismo socialista (1936)
- El yanaconaje en las haciendas de Piura (posthumous, 1947)

His ideas influenced the thinking of José Carlos Mariátegui.
