= José Carlos Mariátegui Museum =

Museum in Peru

Coordinates: 12°03′50″S 77°02′20″W

- Casa Museo José Carlos Mariátegui
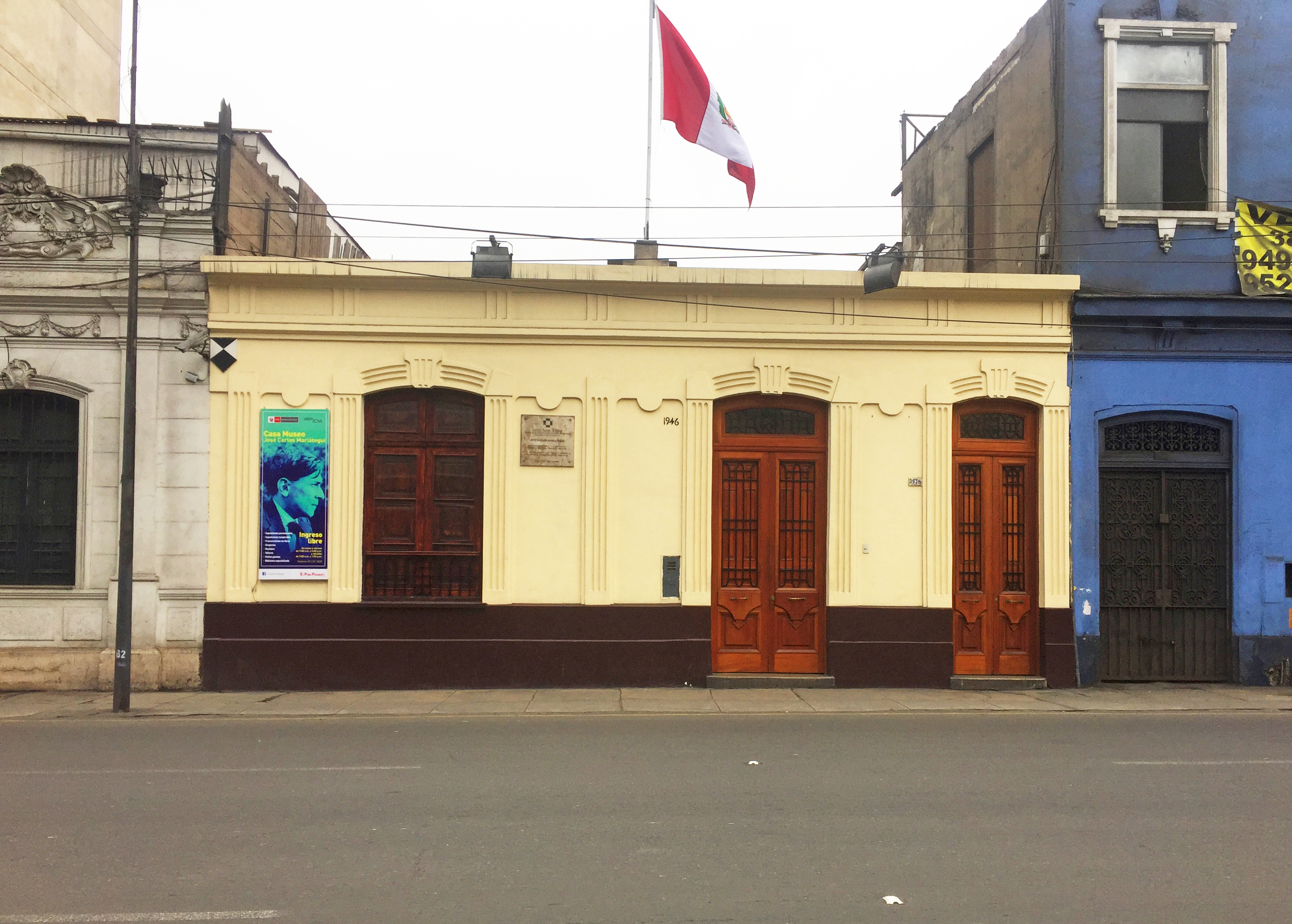
- Established: 14 June 1994
- Location: Jr. Washington 1946/1938
- Type: Historic house museum
- Director: Roxana Chirinos Lazo
- Website: MINCETUR Website

José Carlos Mariátegui Museum is a historic house museum located in the final residence of Peruvian writer José Carlos Mariátegui, where he spent the last five years of his life. The museum is dedicated to the life and work of Mariátegui, as well as that of his wife Anna and partner Victoria Ferrer, in the context of how the rooms in the household were used. Mariátegui moved into the house in 1925.

The house dates back to the early 20th century, and was declared a National Historic Monument in 1972. It was inaugurated on June 14, 1994, coinciding with the 100th anniversary of Mariátegui's birth.

== See also ==
- José Carlos Mariátegui
