= Racism in Peru =

Discrimination based on race or ethnicity in Peru

Racism in Peru comprises negative attitudes and views on race or ethnicity which are related to each other, are held by various people and groups in Peru, and have been reflected in discriminatory laws, practices and actions (including violence) at various times in the history of Peru against racial or ethnic groups. Peruvian intellectuals, who were mainly white and based in the developed capital city of Lima, historically denied that racism existed in Peru and did not focus on the social issue, often participating in racism themselves. The concentration of wealth amongst elites in Lima through centralismo resulted in a history of systemic racism in Peru, with individuals in Lima basing their discrimination against rural individuals on race and geographical location.

== Background ==
=== Colonial Peru ===
Since the time of the Viceroyalty of Peru, with the establishment of the Spanish colonizers, it brought with it the formation of a Creole aristocracy with a strong endogamy among whites, where miscegenation was not something seen compared to other social classes.

=== Republic of Peru ===
Since independence from Spain was obtained in 1821, the endogamous trend among white continued and was a common practice, thus combining a series of systemic racism with classism. This racism carried over into economic inequality, with wealth gathering in Lima through centralismo, while indigenous groups in rural Peru experienced poverty and poor health services. Due to centralismo, racism also developed geographically, with Limeños, or people from Lima, primarily being white while the "cholo" term was associated with populations of indigenous or indigenous-like individuals. From 1910 to 1930, intellectuals focused on race, though later into the twentieth century racism became "silent" through discriminating against class or culture. Intellectuals distanced themselves from establishing a social hierarchy based on race and instead based this system on intellect, though intellect was affected by the existing structure of centralismo, with higher levels of education granting whiteness to citizens of Lima while those in outlying regions not being granted the same social status.

== Discrimination against Indigenous people ==
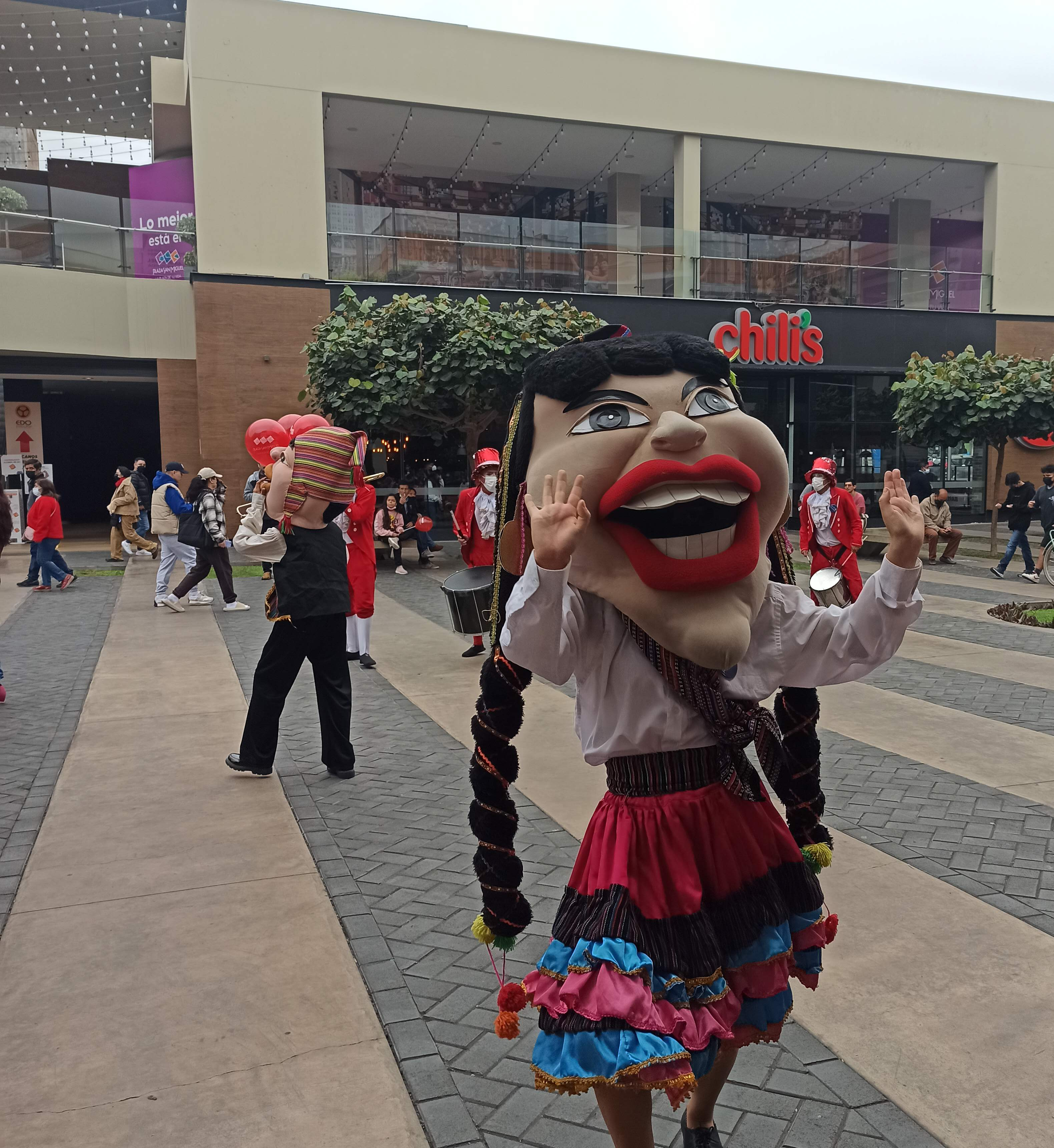
Caricatures of indigenous Peruvians used during the Fiestas Patrias in 2022

=== Choleo ===
It is common within Peruvian society that the cultural and racial aspects of the indigenous people are rejected. The use of the word "cholo", also widespread in other South American countries, has a strong racist component that has been appeased in recent decades, acquiring nuances of different connotation (even affective), depending on the context in which it is used. The term "serrano" is commonly used as a pejorative with which the individual from the Sierra del Perú who emigrated to Lima or the other large urban agglomerations of the country are designated, and there is also discrimination against people in rural areas. Peruvians who had a background from the Sierra and were educated were described as "gente decente" ("decent folks"), and recognized as "honorary whites", emphasizing their intellect over their phenotypes.

The term "chola bourgeoisie" refers to a group of indigenous or mestizo origin that, through the creation of companies and other private initiatives, has reached socioeconomic levels higher than the national average income and purchasing power, in a free market scenario, in order to differentiate them from the traditional Creole aristocracy.

=== Violence ===
==== Ethnic violence and genocide ====
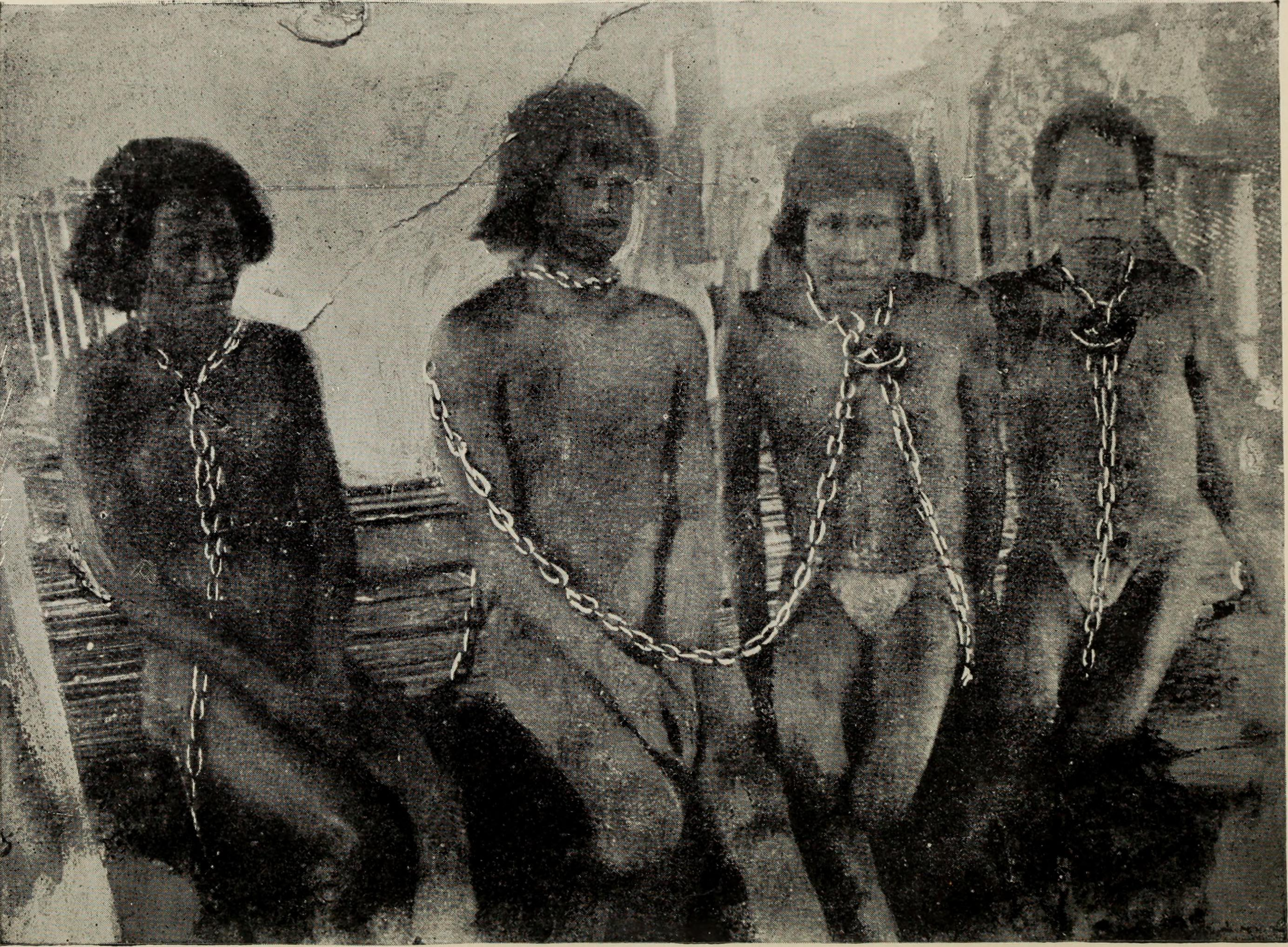
Indigenous Peruvians enslaved during the Putumayo genocide

During the Rubber Fever in the Peruvian Amazon between 1879 and 1912, rubbery businessmen took prisoners to whom various crimes against humanity were committed; the indigenous people were treated as "inferior", the event was later described as the Putumayo genocide. As a result of the genocide, 40,000 to over 250,000 indigenous Peruvians were killed.

In 1964, the first government of President Fernando Belaúnde Terry from Lima bombed the basin of the Yavarí River in the Loreto department, the event was known as the Matsé genocide, because the objective of Belaúnde was to exterminate the indigenous communities of Mayorunas, the advertising campaign to favor the act of the government described the mayoruna as "more bloodthirsty than any red skin from the far west" and to extermination with the phrase: "By blood and fire, civilization and barbarism dispute a territory where until yesterday the viper and the tiger reigned".

Between 1980 and 2000, the indigenous and mestizos groups of the Peruvian jungle and mountains were the main victims of the internal conflict in Peru. For the Truth and Reconciliation Commission, discrimination and racism, through terror, was one of the determining factors of the development of internal war. In an effort to stabilize the nation, the Armed Forces of Peru drafted Plan Verde, a clandestine military operation developed by the armed forces of Peru during the internal conflict in Peru; it involved the genocide of impoverished and indigenous Peruvians, the control or censorship of media in the nation and the establishment of a neoliberal economy controlled by a military junta in Peru. Plan Verde detailed a goal to sterilize impoverished citizens in what Rospigliosi described as "ideas frankly similar to the Nazis", with the military writing that "the general use of sterilization processes for culturally backward and economically impoverished groups is convenient", describing these groups as "unnecessary burdens" and that "given their incorrigible character and lack of resources ... there is only their total extermination". The extermination of vulnerable Peruvians was described by planners as "an economic interest, it is an essential constant in the strategy of power and development of the state". When Alberto Fujimori took office in 1990, he would go on to adopt many of the policies outlined in Plan Verde. Plan Verde's forced sterilization of vulnerable groups through the Programa Nacional de Población has been variably described as an ethnic cleansing or genocidal operation. At least 300,000 Peruvians were victims of forced sterilization in the 1990s, with the majority being affected by the PNSRPF. According to Peru's congressional subcommittee investigations, USAID, the United Nations Population Fund (UNFPA) and the Nippon Foundation supported the sterilization efforts of the Fujimori government. One can also speak of the so-called Holocausto Asháninka ("Asháninka Holocaust"), genocide perpetrated by members of the Shining Path guerrilla against a this ethnic group.

==== Terruqueo: A Divisive Rhetorical Tactic ====
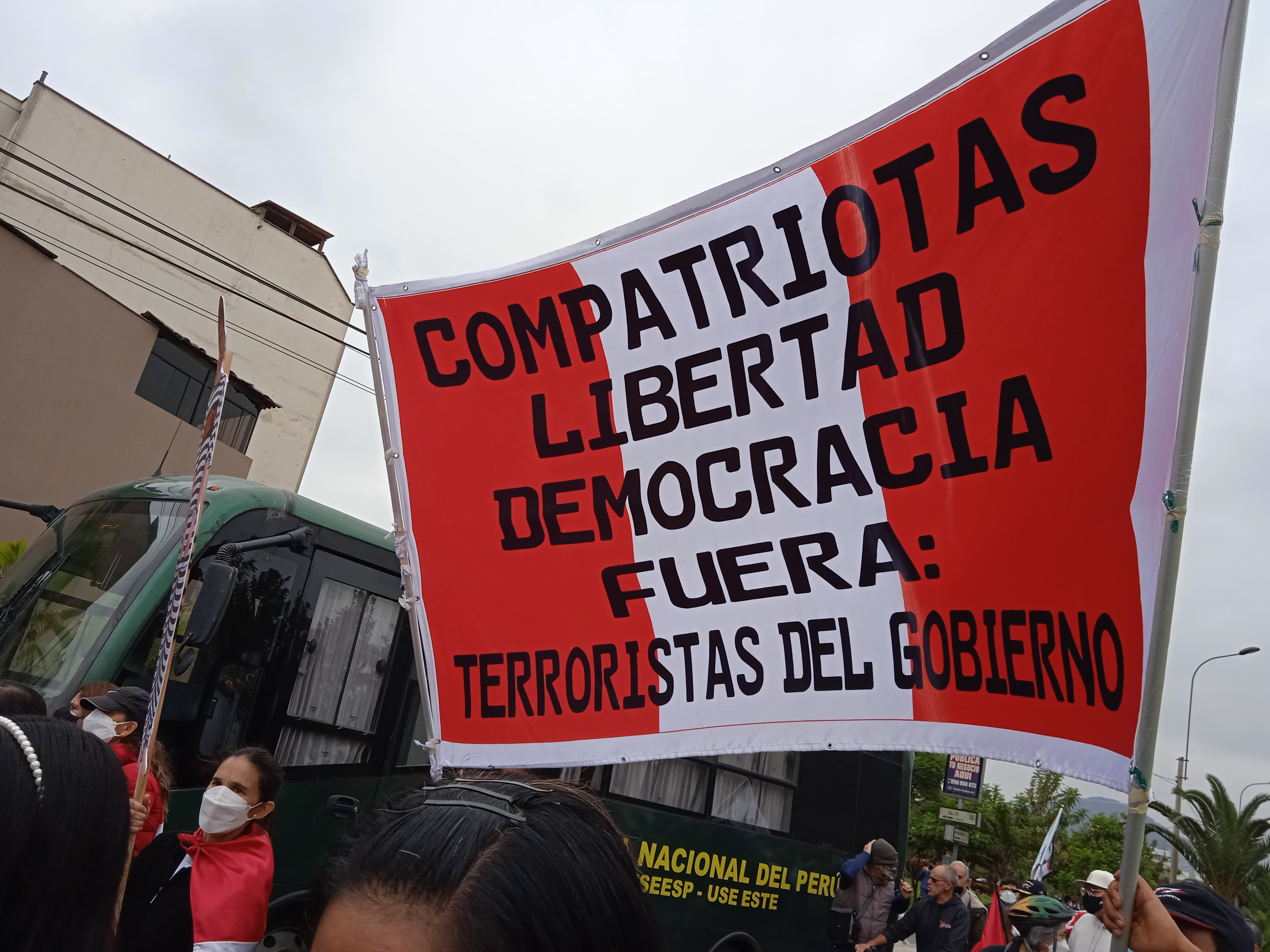
Sign protesting the administration of Pedro Castillo, stating "Get out: Government Terrorists"

In Peru, certain right-wing groups have employed a strategy known as terruqueo, which involves utilizing negative campaigning and occasionally adopting a racist tone. This tactic is used to label those opposed to anti-Fujimorist viewpoints, left-wing political opponents, and critics of the existing neoliberal status quo as either terrorists or sympathizers of terrorism. This strategy is often associated with right-wing parties, particularly within the Fujimorist movement. Since the 1980s, the term terruco has been publicly employed by right-wing politicians in Peru to target left-wing, progressive, and indigenous groups, sometimes resorting to racial overtones.

During the polarized second round of the 2021 Peruvian general election, a barrage of messages surfaced on social media, targeting voters who had chosen Pedro Castillo, a rural teacher of Andean heritage, known for wearing traditional attire and speaking in Andean Spanish. These messages portrayed these voters as ignorant and advocated for harm to rural areas and indigenous communities, which were considered the base of support for Peru Libre. Conservative politician Rafael López Aliaga reportedly made statements inciting violence, including allegedly chanting "Death to communism! Death to Cerrón! Death to Castillo!" to supporters in May 2021. Additionally, during a rally organized by Willax TV owner Erasmo Wong Lu on June 26, 2021, he was said to have proclaimed "Death to communism, get out of here, filthy communists, you have awakened the lion, to the streets!"

During the 2022–2023 Peruvian political protests, the term terruqueo was again wielded, this time by both right-wing factions and the government of Dina Boluarte, to brand protesters as terrorists. This labeling provided authorities with a pretext to respond with force, often without accountability.

== Discrimination against black people ==
The first black inhabitants were brought to Peru with the establishment of the Spanish Empire in the current Peruvian territories, who took them as slaves to work productive activities where a strong workforce was required, in the case of men, such as mining and agriculture, and women to work in the domestic service of the most affluent classes. Racism towards the Afro-descendant community in Peru manifests itself not only towards Afro-Peruvians, but also towards other Afro-Americans of other nationalities residing in the country.

Afro-Peruvian artist Victoria Santa Cruz portrayed her experience of discrimination during her childhood in her poem Me gritaron negra.

In 2010, activist Mónica Carrillo protested the return of the character of comedian Jorge Benavides "El Negro Mama" to television, considering him "denigrating and racist" for the Afro-Peruvian community.

Saga Falabella has been accused of using advertisements that are described as racist on multiple occasions, including one ad where a black woman was portrayed as being dirty compared to a white woman which resulted with an apology following demands from the Ministry of Culture.

In 2018, the Ministry of Culture issued a statement complaining about a stereotypical and racist imitation of Afro-Peruvian soccer player Jefferson Farfán broadcast on the Peruvian subsidiary of the Fox Sports television network.

In mid-2020, the Alicorp company decided to change the name of its emblematic line of powder preparations "La Negrita" due to its possible racist image towards the Afro-Peruvian community. In October 2021, it was announced that the brand would be called "Umsha", in reference to the jungle version of the yunza.

== Discrimination against Asians ==
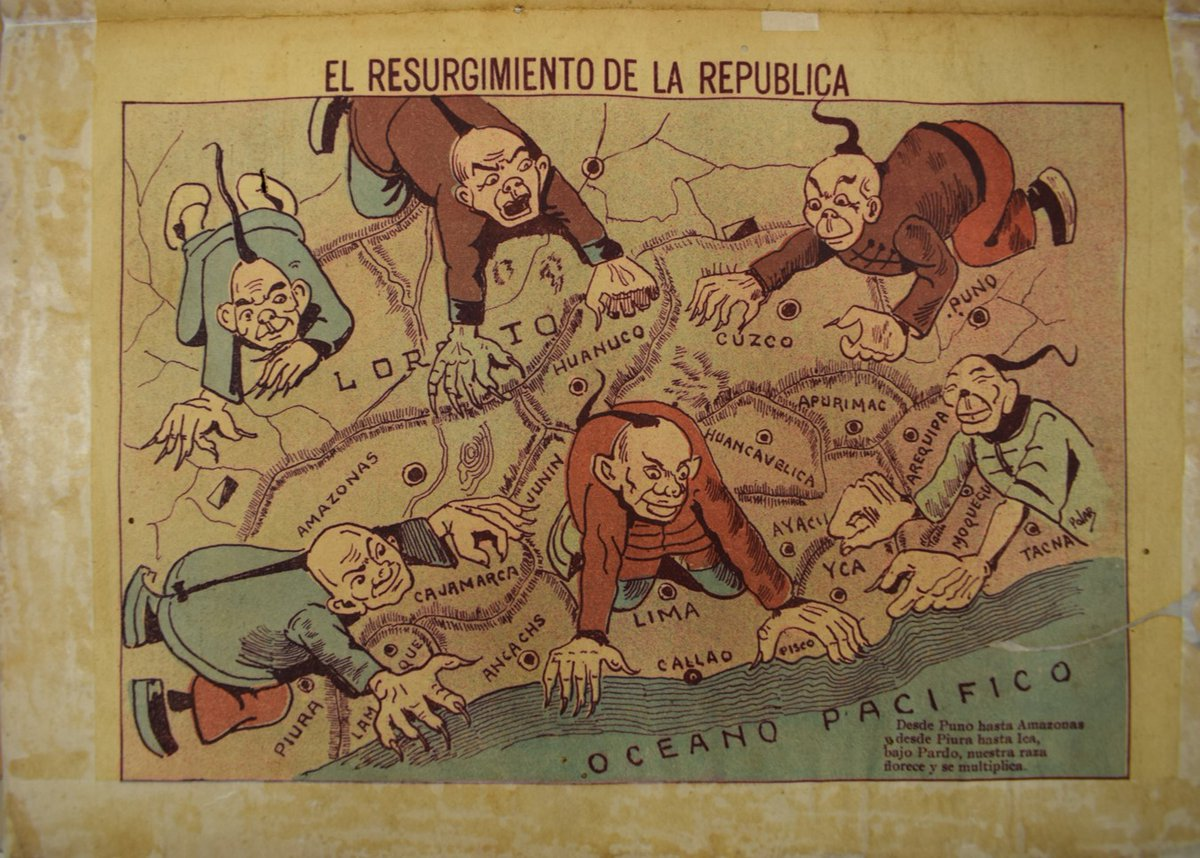
The resurgence of the Republic, a political cartoon describing the Chinese as invaders of Peru

The first Chinese immigrants in the current Peruvian territories arrived as a replacement for black slaves after the abolition of slavery in 1849. Those immigrants were received to work especially in agricultural work, in conditions of labor exploitation and other situations of poor living conditions.

During the War of the Pacific, the Peruvian government used Asian culís mercenaries and soldiers against Chilean troops. The conflict increased the anti-Chinese sentiment in the Peruvian population, mainly due to the help of the culíes to the Chilean occupation troops, also in the sugar mills blacks discriminated against the Chinese. After the defeats of Chorrillos and Miraflores, the Lima population looted the shops run by Asians and there was massacre of Chinese.

The federalist revolutionaries of Loreto led by the military Guillermo Cervantes in 1896, described Chinese immigrants, as well as other ethnic groups that were not native to Loreto, as "deious plagues." The historian Jorge Bracamonte reports that the presence of the Chinese in the Peruvian capital was seen as "a threat to Peruvian public health," despite the fact that the medicinal herbs brought from Asia by the Chinese were an appreciated asset to combat the yellow fever epidemic of 1868 in Lima and Callao.

During the Oncenio de Leguía, the Chinese community had already reached such a degree of influence that they began to pressure the Peruvian government to resolve the anti-Chinese discrimination that existed in the Peruvian consulate in Hong Kong. In contrast, an "Anti-Asian Patriotic League" was created to curb Chinese immigration in the country, and an attempt was made to draw a law through the new government of the military Luis Miguel Sánchez Cerro took openly anti-Asian measures, such as totally prohibiting the entry of Chinese and even Chinese-Peruvians into the country. In addition, Chinese businesses that were affected by the riots of the coup d'état were not economically compensated, these Chinese businessmen continued to demand compensation until 1936, without any success.

In 1941, during World War II, about 1,800 South Americans of Japanese origin were accused of espionage without evidence and deported to the United States by the government of Peru. On June 14, 2011, the government of Alan García apologized to Japan for the abuse committed. This event has been described as a case of xenophobia and racism towards Asians in Peru.

In the case of the Japanese, similar situations occurred. With the election of Alberto Fujimori as president of Peru, the racist expressions used by the opposition to his government were common, generating an anti-Japanese sentiment through arguments of hasty generalization and other fallacies against the Japanese community. In the 21st century, there was a strong anti-Japanese sentiment related to politics Keiko Fujimori, daughter of former President Alberto Fujimori, especially on social networks during the 2011 Peruvian general elections.

== Discrimination against Jews ==
Between 1569 and 1820, Holy Office documents from the Peruvian Inquisition show that various tests were created for the purpose of identifying Jews and Muslims, and members of those groups who were brought before kangaroo courts and failed those tests were punished, tortured or killed for their beliefs.

During World War II, Peruvians who were sympathetic to the National Socialist ideology which was imposed in Nazi Germany by Adolf Hitler and the Nazi Party provoked an anti-Semitic sentiment among Peruvians. Neo-Nazi groups in Peru have publicly expressed their desire to expel Peruvian Jews from the country.

== Discrimination against white people ==
The ethnocacerism ideology, developed at the beginning of the 21st century by the revolutionary Antauro Humala, is described as advocating anti-white sentiment.

== Prejudice against Venezuelans ==
In response to the Venezuelan migration crisis and the rapid influx of Venezuelan immigrants to Peru since 2017, there has been a rise in anti-Venezuelan sentiments and vice versa. This can be attributed primarily to cultural differences and clashes with immigrants, some of whom may harbor racist and even aporophobic feelings, depending on each individual case.
