= Manolo Forno =

Peruvian LGBT rights activist

- Born: Manuel Hildebrando Forno Castro-Pozo; 15 November 1953 (age 72); Cusco, Peru
- Occupations: Activist, writer

Manuel Hildebrando Forno Castro-Pozo (born 15 November 1953), known as Manolo Forno, is a Peruvian LGBTQ rights activist and writer. He is a co-founder of the Movimiento Homosexual de Lima ('Homosexual Movement of Lima'), an organization founded in 1982 to defend the rights of LGBT people in Peru.

== Early life ==
Forno was born in Cusco. He is the grandson of Peruvian teacher, sociologist and politician Hildebrando Castro Pozo.

== Activism ==
In 1982, Forno was among the activists who helped create the Movimiento Homosexual de Lima. He later served as the organization's executive director from 1994 to 1997. He has also worked with organizations that promote sexual rights, reproductive rights and human rights for LGBT people in Peru.

Forno has supported campaigns for legal protections for LGBT people, including civil unions, same-sex marriage, gender identity rights and measures against hate crimes. In 2010, he ran unsuccessfully for municipal office in the Miraflores district of Lima.

In 2021, the Ministry of Justice and Human Rights (Peru) gave Forno the "Justice and Human Rights" Award for his work defending the rights of LGBT people.

In 2023, Forno published the autobiographical book ¿Rosca o imitación de rosca?.

== Works ==
- ¿Rosca o imitación de rosca? (Gafas Moradas, 2023)
