= Variedades =

Peruvian magazine

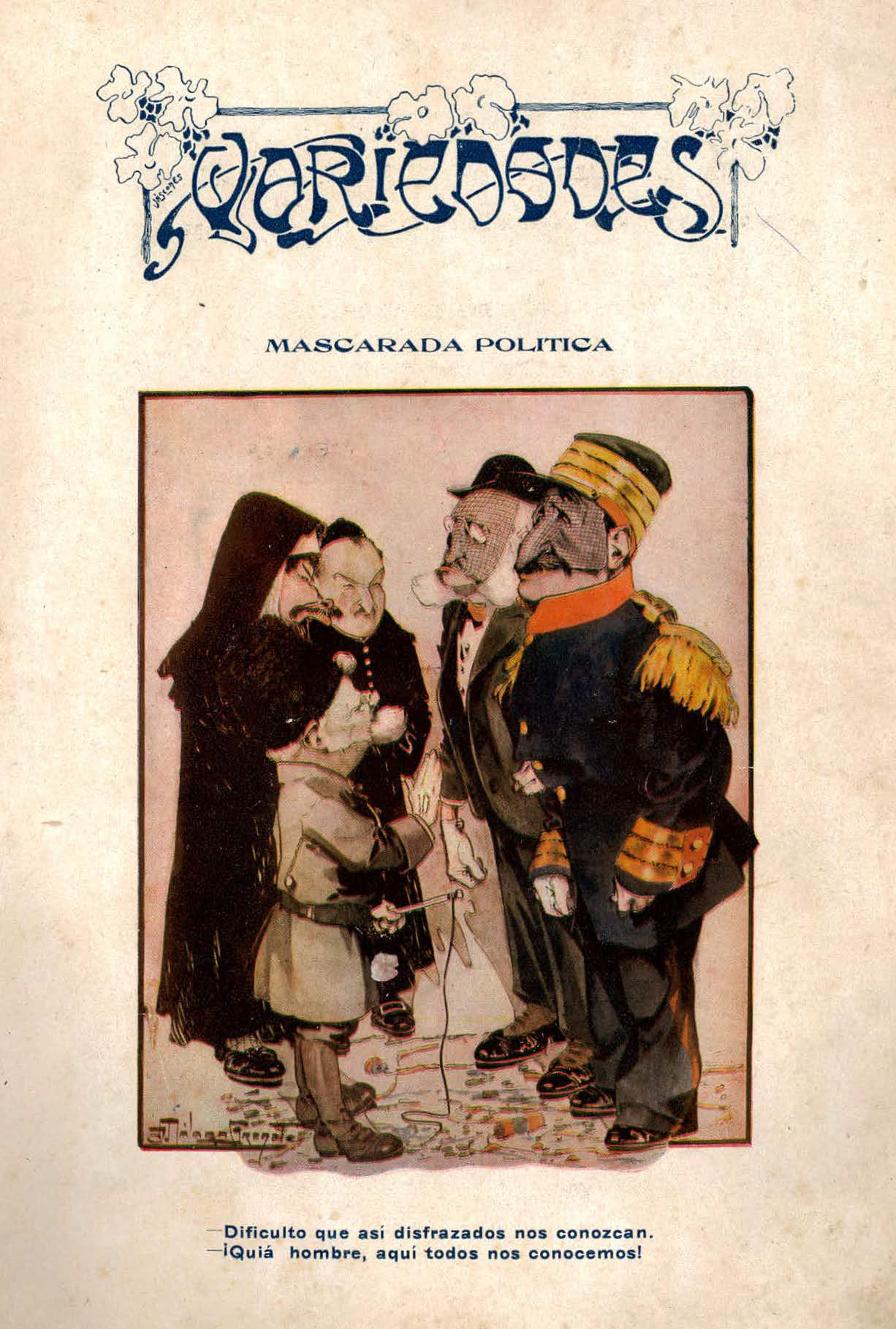
- First issue cover
- Editor: Several
- Frequency: Weekly
- Founder: Manuel Moral y Vega
- Founded: February 29, 1908
- First issue: March 7, 1908
- Final issue Number: September 30, 1931; 1230
- Country: Peru

Variedades was a Peruvian weekly illustrated magazine of the early 20th century. It was founded in 1908 by Manuel Moral y Vega, as a successor to Prisma magazine, but with a more agile, entertaining and popular character. It was published until 1931.

A weekly magazine of the same name is published by Peruvian newspaper El Peruano.

== Foundation ==
Its founder and editor was Manuel Moral y Vega, a Portuguese photographer who, from his studio on Mercedes Street, changed the concept of a magazine in Peru with an advanced photographic technique. He was the one who introduced the trichrome technique in Peru in November 1905, with a reproduction of a vase with roses, in Prisma magazine, a luxury magazine.

Prisma was an illustrated magazine established in 1905 by Moral, alongside collaborators Federico Larrañaga and Julio S. Hernández. Hernández was a political acquaintance of Larrañaga—himself a journalist and founder of El Canal during his time as consul in Panama—and owner of the printing company of newspaper El País, already defunct at the time. Moral and Larrañaga established a mutual society that ceased to exist when the latter left in 1906, and the magazine continued to be published until 1907.

The prospectus number of Variedades appeared on February 29, 1908, with its heading appearing as year IV of the publication, which implied its claim to be the continuation of Prisma, which had been awarded with silver medal at the 1906 Milan International Exhibition.

Its first official number appeared on March 7, 1908. It had a long duration, compared to other contemporary magazines, since it was published until No. 1230, of September 30, 1931.

== Directors ==
During almost its entire career, Variedades was directed by the writer Clemente Palma, son of the traditionalist Ricardo Palma. In the edition of August 27, 1930, Ricardo Vegas García appeared as the new director. His departure from Palma was due to his notorious links with the government of Augusto B. Leguía, which had just been overthrown. Palma was once again listed as director from March 18 to July 22, 1931. In the last issues Carlos Gamarra appears as editor.

== Sections ==
Varieties, as its name revealed, offered a set of topics to appeal to all kinds of readers. Thus, there were sections dedicated to caricatures: «Chirigotas», «Gente de casa» and «Caricatures abroad». Others gave a cosmopolitan air both in the literary, economic and political spheres: «Theater and shows», «Fashion», «Curiosities and clippings», «Commerce and industry», «European information», «Figures and aspects of life world" (which from September 1923 would be in charge of the pen of José Carlos Mariátegui), which allowed knowing the most varied aspects of the foreigner. On the other hand, sections such as "From the provinces" and "Homemade recipes" gave the magazine a local air; for example, the recipes were of all kinds: from how to cure burns to how to avoid termites.

== Editors and collaborators ==
Important figures of Peruvian culture wrote in this magazine, such as the following:

- Manuel Beingolea
- Enrique Bustamante y Ballivián
- José María Eguren
- José Gálvez Barrenechea
- Fausto Gastañeta
- José Carlos Mariátegui
- Angélica Palma
- Clemente Palma
- María Wiesse
- Luis Alberto Sánchez
- Horacio H. Urteaga
- Abraham Valdelomar
- Luis Valle Goicochea
- César Vallejo
- Luis E. Valcárcel

== Legacy ==
According to Peruvian historian Alberto Tauro del Pino, Variedades was “a milestone in the development of [Peruvian] graphic journalism, a throbbing testimony of the political and social, cultural and sports activity carried out over five decades; and a repository of important writing collaborations[...]"

== See also ==
- Media in Peru
- Caretas
