= Amauta =

Title for teachers in the Inca Empire

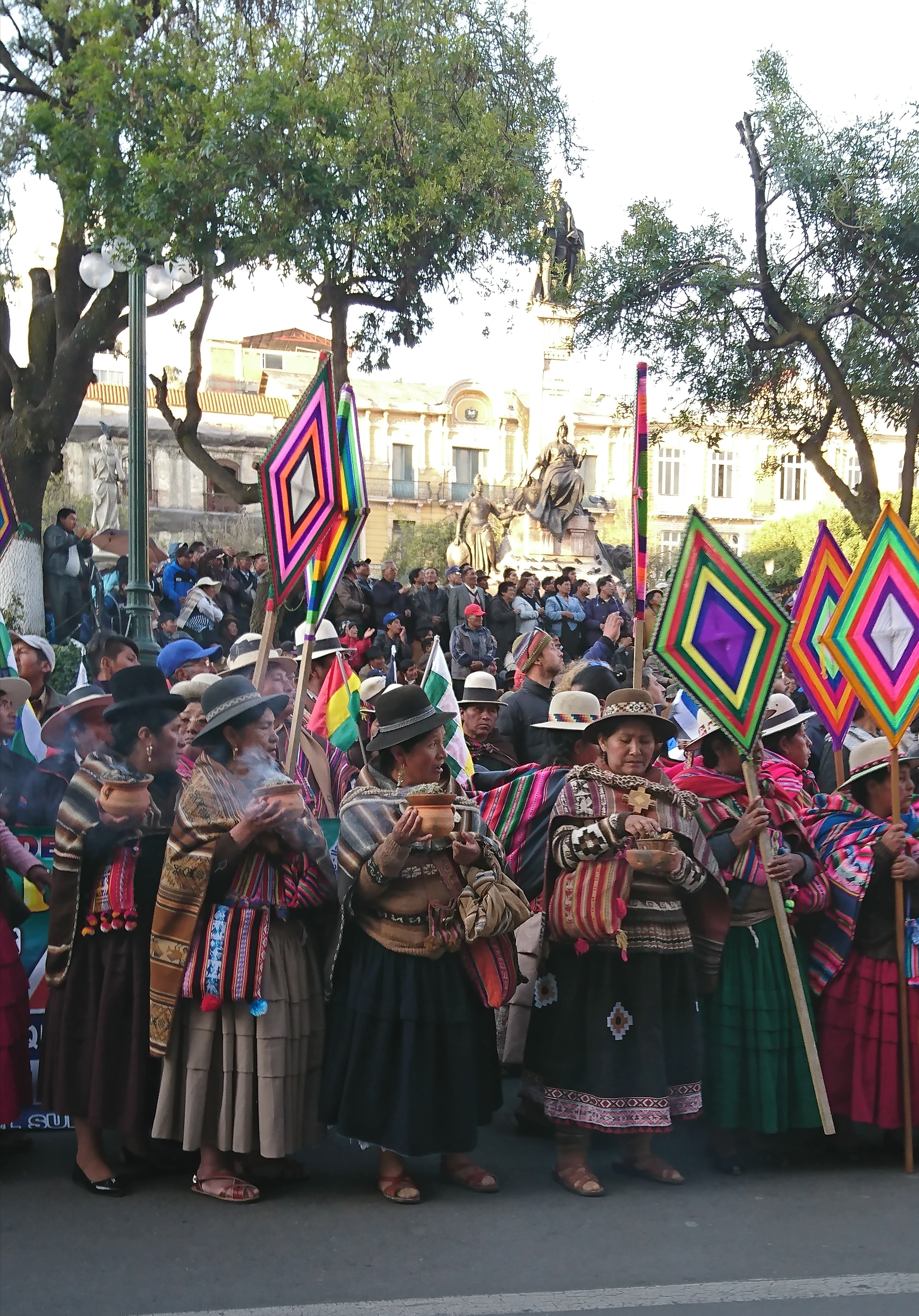
Group of amautas in Plaza Murillo

Amauta (meaning "master" or "wise one" in Quechua) was a title for teachers in the Inca Empire, especially of children of the nobility. According to Fray Martin de Murua, a missionary in Peru, education in the Inca empire was instituted in schools called Yachaywasi or "Houses of Knowledge" in Cusco. Students were children of the Inca nobility, the future rulers. The subjects were the moral standards, religion, government tenets, statistics, math, science, the Cusco variety of Quechua, Khipu interpretation, art, music construction, history, agronomy, architecture, medicine, philosophy and cosmological ideas of the earth and the universe, among other subjects.

The original Yachaywasi was constructed and inaugurated by Inca Roca. More schools like this were built as the empire grew, and were the centers of teaching the primary ideologies, histories, and philosophies of the empire. The amautas maintained this knowledge through an oral tradition and passed it on to the future generations.

The word is still used in modern Perú. The Marxist politician and writer José Carlos Mariátegui ran a magazine named "Amauta".

== See also ==
- Amauta Project, sponsored by the Departamento de Ciencia y Tecnología of the OEA (in Spanish)
- Amautas, la aventura del conocimiento
