= Abraham Valdelomar =

Peruvian writer, poet and journalist

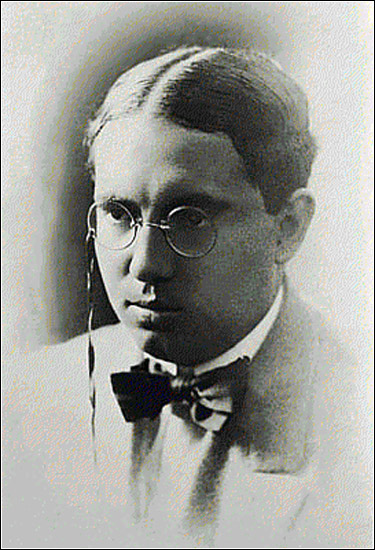
- Valdelomar c. 1910
- Born: Pedro Abraham Valdelomar Pinto; 27 April 1888; Ica, Peru
- Died: 3 November 1919 (aged 31); Ayacucho, Peru
- Occupations: Writer; journalist; poet; playwright
- Writing career
- Pen name: El Conde de Lemos
- Notable works: El Caballero Carmelo; Los hijos del Sol
- Movements: Postmodernismo, Colónida

Pedro Abraham Valdelomar Pinto (April 27, 1888 – November 3, 1919) was a Peruvian narrator, poet, journalist, essayist, and dramatist. He is considered the founder of the avant-garde in Peru, although he is more often classified as a posmodernista. He founded the literary journal Colónida and led the movement of the same name, which marked a shift from academicism to a more introspective and provincial literature. Along with Julio Ramón Ribeyro, he is widely regarded as one of the most important short story writers in Peruvian history.

Valdelomar is best known for his "criollo" stories, most notably "El Caballero Carmelo" (The Knight Carmelo), and for his poetry, including the famous sonnet "Tristitia". His image has been featured on the S/ 50 banknote since its introduction in 1991.

== Biography ==
=== Early life and education ===
Valdelomar was born in the city of Ica, the sixth son of Anfiloquio Valdelomar Fajardo and Carolina Pinto Bardales. In 1892, he moved with his family to the port of Pisco, a coastal setting that would later deeply influence his most famous works. He attended primary school in Pisco and Chincha.

In 1900, he moved to Lima to attend high school at the historic Colegio Guadalupe. There, he founded and directed the school newspaper La Idea Guadalupana (1903). In 1905, he entered the National University of San Marcos to study Literature. However, he left the university in 1906 to work as a cartoonist and writer for magazines such as Monos y Monadas, Fray K. Bezón, and Variedades. During this period, his poetry showed the influence of Modernismo and Gabriele D'Annunzio.

=== Politics and diplomatic mission ===
In 1912, Valdelomar participated in the presidential campaign of Guillermo Billinghurst. Following Billinghurst's victory, Valdelomar was appointed director of the official newspaper El Peruano. In 1913, he was sent as a diplomat to Rome, Italy. From Rome, he wrote chronicles for the Lima newspaper La Nación and produced his masterpiece, the short story "El Caballero Carmelo", which won a literary contest in 1913.

After Billinghurst was overthrown by a military coup in 1914, Valdelomar was forced to resign his diplomatic post and return to Peru. Back in Lima, he worked as a secretary to the historian José de la Riva-Agüero y Osma and published biographical works such as La Mariscala (1915).

=== The Palais Concert and Colónida ===
Valdelomar became a central figure in Lima's bohemian scene. He was a dandy and a regular at Palais Concert, a famous café on the Jirón de la Unión. He is credited with the famous phrase: "El Perú es Lima, Lima es el Jirón de la Unión, el Jirón de la Unión es el Palais Concert y el Palais Concert soy yo" ("Peru is Lima, Lima is the Jirón de la Unión, the Jirón de la Unión is the Palais Concert, and the Palais Concert is me").

In 1916, he founded the literary magazine Colónida. Although it only ran for four issues, the magazine rebelled against the elitist and colonial trends in Peruvian literature, promoting a new generation of provincial writers. This group, known as the "Movimiento Colónida", included intellectuals like José Carlos Mariátegui, whom Valdelomar mentored.

=== Death ===
In 1919, Valdelomar was elected as a deputy for the Regional Congress of the Center. While in Ayacucho for a session, he suffered a severe fall down a staircase after a banquet, which fractured his spine. He died two days later, on November 3, 1919, at the age of 31. His remains were transferred to Lima and buried in the Presbítero Matías Maestro Cemetery.

== Literary style ==
Valdelomar's work is characterized by a tender, nostalgic tone, often focusing on childhood memories, family life, and the landscape of the Peruvian coast. He moved away from the artificiality of Modernismo towards a more intimate and simple expression, which critics have termed Postmodernismo.

His short stories, particularly those set in Pisco, are celebrated for their evocative descriptions and emotional depth. "El Caballero Carmelo" marks the beginning of modern narrative in Peru by introducing the "provincial" subject not as a costumbrist caricature, but with dignity and lyrical nostalgia.

== Legacy ==
A Google Doodle on 27 April 2019 commemorated Valdelomar's 131st birth anniversary.

== Selected works ==
=== Short stories ===
- El Caballero Carmelo (1913/1918)
- Los ojos de Judas (1914)
- El vuelo de los cóndores (1914)
- Hebaristo, el sauce que murió de amor (1917)
- Los hijos del Sol (1921, posthumous)

=== Poetry ===
- Tristitia (1916)
- El hermano ausente en la cena de Pascua (1916)
- Las voces múltiples (1916, anthology with the Colónida group)

=== Essays and chronicles ===
- La psicología de gallinazo (1917)
- Belmonte, el trágico (1918)

=== Plays ===
- La Mariscala (1916, with José Carlos Mariátegui)
- Verdolaga (unfinished tragedy)

== See also ==
- Peruvian literature
- José Carlos Mariátegui
- César Vallejo
