= José Carlos Mariátegui =

Peruvian writer and academic (1894–1930)

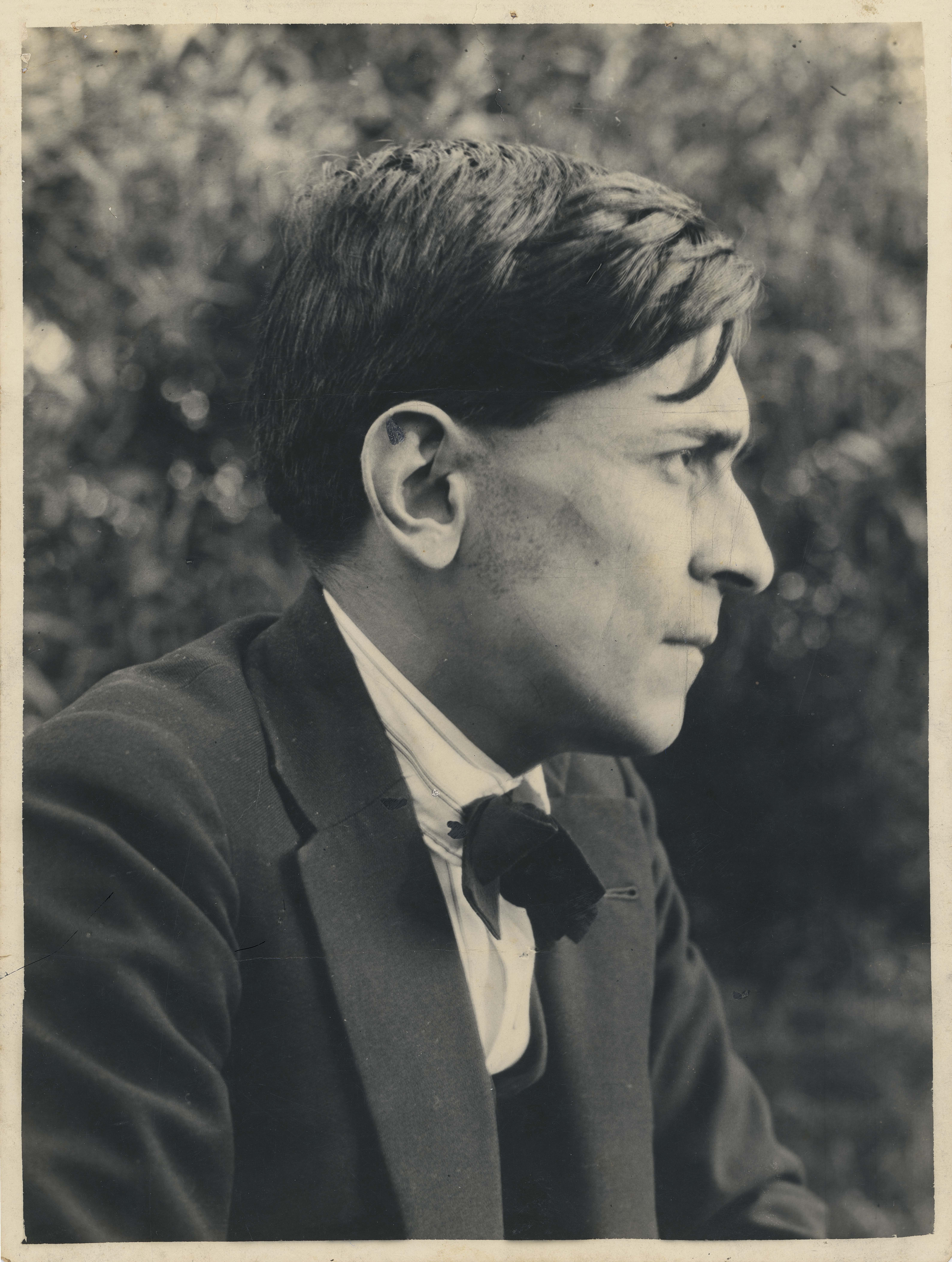
- Mariátegui in 1929
- Born: José del Carmen Eliseo Mariátegui De La Chira; 14 June 1894; Moquegua, Peru
- Died: 16 April 1930 (aged 35); Lima, Peru
- Occupation: Author

Philosophical work
- Era: Late modern period
- Region: Latin American philosophy
- School: Marxism
- Main interests: Politics, aesthetics
- Notable works: Seven Interpretive Essays on Peruvian Reality (1928)

Signature
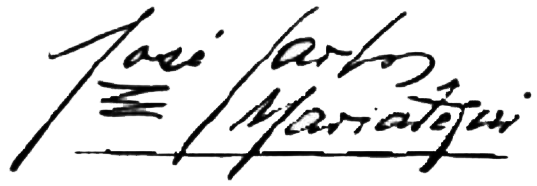

José Carlos Mariátegui La Chira (Spanish pronunciation: [xoˌse ˌkaɾ.loz maˌɾja.t̪e.ɣ̞i la ˈt͡ʃi.ɾa]; June 14, 1894 – April 16, 1930), sometimes referred to in Peru as El Amauta (from Quechua: hamawt'a, "teacher"), was a Peruvian politician, and Marxist writer. A prolific author despite his early death, Mariátegui is considered one of the greatest scholars of Latin America. His Seven Interpretive Essays on Peruvian Reality (1928), a synthesis of his thought, became a reference work for the intelligentsia of the continent.

He was the founder of the Peruvian Socialist Party (PSP) and the General Confederation of Workers of Peru (CGTP) in 1928 and 1929 respectively. The PSP initially adhered to Mariateguism for a syndicalist-influenced socialism "without tracing or copying," but after Mariategui's death, it would be reformed as the Peruvian Communist Party to be in-line Marxism-Leninism.

For the sociologist and philosopher Michael Löwy, Mariátegui is "undoubtedly the most vigorous and original Marxist thinker that Latin America has ever known." Along the same lines, José Pablo Feinmann, Argentine philosopher and cultural critic, declared him the "greatest Latin American Marxist philosopher."

== Biography ==
=== Childhood and youth ===
Mariátegui was born in Moquegua in 1894. His parents were María Amalia La Chira Ballejos and Francisco Javier Mariátegui Requejo. Among his ancestors was the illustrious liberal thinker Francisco Javier Mariátegui y Tellería. He had two siblings: Guillermina and Julio César Mariátegui.

In 1899, he moved with his mother and his brothers to Huacho and in 1902, after an accident at school, he was admitted to the Maison de Santé clinic in Lima. After a long recovery he was left with ankylosis in his left leg for the rest of his life. Having become unable to partake in the recreations typical of his age, he began reading and reflecting.

In 1907, his father Francisco Javier Mariátegui died in the port of Callao.

In 1909, Mariátegui joined the newspaper La Prensa to perform auxiliary tasks, first as a rejones (folder) and then as a linotypist's assistant. Despite not having completed his school studies, he was trained in journalism and began to work as a columnist, first in La Prensa (1914-1916) and then in the newspaper El Tiempo (1916-1919), at the same time that he collaborated in the magazines Mundo Limeño, Lulú, El Turf and Colónida. Using the pseudonym Juan Croniqueur, he ridiculed Lima's frivolity and exhibited a vast self-taught culture, which brought him closer to the avant-garde intellectual and artistic nuclei. He became friends with the writer Abraham Valdelomar, with whom he formed a dilettante duo whose duels of wit they reproduced in their chronicles. Around that time (which he later contemptuously called his "stone age"), he enthusiastically cultivated poetry but never published his announced collection of poems, Sadness.

In 1918 his interests turned to social problems. Together with the journalist César Falcón and Félix del Valle, he founded the magazine Nuestra Época, in which he criticized militarism and traditional politics but of which only two issues came out. In 1919, also in collaboration with Falcón, he founded the newspaper La Razón, in which he supported university reform and workers' struggles. This newspaper did not have a long life either and was closed by the government of President Augusto B. Leguía, officially for having expressed contempt for members of parliament, although it was most likely due to the growing popular demands that it encouraged.

=== Trip to Europe and socialist training ===
Mariátegui and Falcón traveled to Europe on a scholarship they received from the Leguía government as a covert form of deportation. They passed through New York, coinciding with a strike of workers on the docks of the port, and in Germany with the Spartacist revolution, reaching the port of Le Havre in November and then Paris. The researcher Sylvers Malcolm claims that both traveled as "overseas propagandists" of the Leguía government; that both belonged to the Foreign Relations sector; and that they were paid and on scholarships, as was believed for a time. Mariátegui was assigned to the Peruvian Consulate in Rome and Falcón to the Peruvian Consulate in Madrid. All of this appears corroborated in a letter from Mariategui to Victoria Ferrer, dated January 24, 1920.

During this trip, his eldest daughter, Gloria María Mariátegui Ferrer, was born from his relationship with Victoria Ferrer González.

Mariátegui said that it was in Europe that he did the most of his learning. He linked up with leading writers, studied languages, inquired about new intellectual and artistic concerns, and attended international conferences and meetings.

In Italy, he married Anna Chiappe and was present during the occupation of the factories in Turin, as well as at the XVII National Congress of the Italian Socialist Party in Livorno, where the historic split took place and the Italian Communist Party (PCI) was formed. He was part of PSI study circles and took on Marxism as a method of study when Benito Mussolini was about to take power. According to his analysis, the victory of fascism is the price a country must pay for the contradictions of the left.

Mariátegui left Italy and traveled throughout Europe, hoping to be able to return to Peru. He visited Paris, Munich, Vienna, Budapest, Prague and Berlin. During this tour, he studied the revolutionary movements that convulsed Europe after the war.

=== Return to Peru ===
On March 17, 1923, Mariátegui returned to Lima, accompanied by his wife and his firstborn. At the invitation of Haya de la Torre, the founder and rector, he gave lectures at the Universidad Popular González Prada on the world crisis resulting from the First World War. He was put in charge of the direction of Claridad magazine when its founder, Víctor Raúl Haya de la Torre, the future leader of APRA, was expelled to Mexico as an exile. He called for the realization of the United Front of Workers. At the end of that same year he announced the publication of Vanguardia: Revista Semanal de Renovación Ideológica, co-directed with Félix del Valle, a project that was not carried out but later became the magazine Amauta.

In 1924, due to his old injury, Mariátegui had to have his leg amputated. He continued his creative activity from a wheelchair. He spent a period of rest in Miraflores, moving on June 1, 1925, to his most symbolic residence on Washington Street, left, No. 544, today known as the José Carlos Mariátegui House Museum. In October 1925, he founded the Editorial Minerva publishing house together with his brother Julius Caesar, which published his works and those of other Peruvian authors, beginning with his first compilation book of essays: The contemporary scene, on world politics. In 1926 he founded the magazine Amauta (wise or teacher in Quechua), which united a broad generation of intellectuals around a new appreciation of national life and gave impetus to the indigenous movement in art and literature. Likewise, he collaborated assiduously in the Lima weekly magazines Variedades and Mundial.

Mariátegui was imprisoned in 1927 during a trial against communists accused of conspiring against the Leguía government, but was later given house arrest. In 1928 he broke politically with Víctor Raúl Haya de la Torre, with whom he had collaborated between 1926 and 1928, when APRA was still only an alliance. "The discrepancies arise for reasons above all of political tactics rather than ideology." On October 7, 1928, he founded the Peruvian Socialist Party, becoming its general secretary a year later. During the same year, he founded the Marxist magazine Labor and published his Seven Interpretive Essays on Peruvian Reality. In 1929 he founded the General Confederation of Workers of Peru.

Mariátegui's political project was put to the test in the Latin American Trade Union Congress in Montevideo (May 1929) and the Latin American Communist Conference (June 1929). They were attended by the Peruvian Socialist Party with five delegates who carry Mariátegui's approach: Hugo Pesce, Julio Portocarrero, José Bracamonte (pilot of the National Merchant Marine, founder of the Federation of Crewmen of Peru), Juan Peves (peasant leader of Ica, founder of the Federation of Yanacones) and Carlos Saldías (textile leader). These approaches were questioned by the political bureau of the International in South America, generating a distance between Mariátegui and the Communist International. Ultimately, Mariátegui "did not agree to subordinate himself to the communist hierarchy."

In February 1930, Eudocio Ravines was appointed General Secretary of the Socialist Party of Peru, replacing Mariátegui, who was preparing a trip to Buenos Aires, where he could treat his illness and participate in the General Council of the Anti-Imperialist League. He also planned to give Amauta greater reach by moving its headquarters from Lima to Buenos Aires.

=== Last days and death ===
At the end of March 1930, Mariátegui was admitted to an emergency hospital accompanied by his friends, including Diego San Román Zeballos (creator of the magazine El Poeta Hereje). He died on April 16, almost on the eve of his long-awaited trip to Buenos Aires. On May 20, the leadership of the Peruvian Socialist Party, with Eudocio Ravines as general secretary and Jean Braham Fuentes Cruz as general president, changed the name of the Socialist Party of Peru to the Peruvian Communist Party.

Mariátegui was buried in the Presbítero Maestro Cemetery with a massive funeral procession. In 1955, commemorating the 25th anniversary of his death, he was transferred to a new mausoleum in the same cemetery (a granite mound by the Spanish sculptor Eduardo Gastelu Macho).

== Thought ==
=== Vision of Peru ===
The conquest not only split the history of Peru, but also its economy. Before the Spaniards arrived, there was a quite solid indigenous communal economy. Material well-being existed thanks to the collectivist organization of Inca society. This organization had enervated the individual impulse and at the same time developed the habit of obedience to social duty.

The conquest established a feudal economy. The Spanish did not seek to develop a solid economy but only to exploit natural resources. In other words, the Spaniards were not formed as a colonizing force (like the English in the United States), but rather constituted themselves as a small court, a bureaucracy. This system determined the republican economy.

The economic policy of the Spanish Crown prevented the emergence of a bourgeoisie in the colonies. These saw independence necessary to ensure their development. Independence is then decided by the needs of capitalist development, in that sense, England played a fundamental role in supporting the nascent American nations.

For Mariátegui, the gamonal (Note: Compare Cacique and Caciquism) inevitably invalidates any law or ordinance protecting the indigenous or peasant. Against the authority of the landowner sustained by environment and habit, the written law is powerless. The mayor or the municipal president, council or city council, the judge, the corregidor, the inspector, the commissioner, the collector, the police and the army are enfeudados to the great property. «The law cannot prevail against the gamonales. The official who persists in imposing it would be abandoned and sacrificed by the central power, near which the influences of gamonalism are always omnipotent, acting directly or through parliament, both ways with the same efficiency.

It is important to clarify the solidarity and commitment to which the regional gamonalismo and the central regime have gradually reached: "for all the defects, for all the vices of the central regime, the gamonalismo is responsible and supportive." The gamonal is a piece in the structure of the centralized administration: he is the local head of one of the political parties with national influence and is the fundamental link in the chain of one of the many clients of the political system. The central power rewards the gamonal by allowing him to enjoy innumerable contracts and alcabalas and currently, by leaving in his hands the royalties produced by the exploitation of natural resources by multinationals and innumerable contracts to complement them. Under these conditions, any decentralization ends with the essential result of an increase in the power of gamonalism.

Guano and saltpeter played a fundamental role in the development of the Peruvian economy. These products quickly increased the wealth of the State, since industrial Europe needed these resources to maintain its agricultural productivity, products that Peru had a monopoly on. This wealth was squandered by the Peruvian State. But it allowed the appearance of commercial and banking capital. A capitalist class began to be constituted, whose origin was found in the old Peruvian aristocracy. These products also allowed the consolidation of the power of the coast, since until then, mining had shaped the Peruvian economy an Andean character. In short, guano and saltpeter allowed the transformation of the Peruvian economy from a feudal system to a capitalist system.

The new nations sought to develop trade. Latin America sold its natural resources and bought manufactured products from Europe, generating a system that mainly benefited the European nations. This system allowed development only to the Atlantic countries, since the distances were enormous for the countries that were on the Pacific coast, as in the case of Peru. Peru, on the other hand, began to trade with Asia, but did not achieve the same development as the Atlantic countries.

In addition, with the War of the Pacific, Peru lost guano and saltpeter. But this war also meant the paralysis of all national production and trade, as well as the loss of foreign credit. Power temporarily fell into the hands of the military, but the Lima bourgeoisie soon regained its function. The Grace Contract was proposed as a measure to get out of the crisis. This contract consolidated the British predominance in Peru, by granting the railways in concession for a period of 66 years.

=== Marxism ===
Since his return from Europe, Mariátegui subscribed to Marxism, in the Leninist version of the Third International, finding remarkable similarities with the thought of Antonio Gramsci, especially with regard to the importance of the cultural superstructure not as a mere "reflection," but from the assessment of its revolutionary potentialities to generate counter-hegemony. Fruit of this notion was his theoretical magazine Amauta and the revolutionary organ Labor, which was closed by the Leguía regime. A tireless critic of the reformism of the Second International and of social democracy, Mariátegui is considered the first Marxist in Latin America, by emphasizing the role of the indigenous masses as the continent's authentic "proletariat" and proclaiming the need for socialist revolution, influenced by the radical syndicalism of Georges Sorel.

=== Fascism ===
Mariátegui argued that fascism was not an "exception" in Italy or a "cataclysm", but an international phenomenon "possible within the logic of History" of the development of monopolies in imperialism and its need to defeat the struggle of the proletariat. He saw fascism as big capital's response to a profound social crisis, an expression that the ruling class no longer felt sufficiently defended by its democratic institutions, for which it blames all the ills of the country before the masses, to the parliamentary system. And he bet on the revolutionary struggle, unleashing the cult of violence against the new order of the fascist state, conceived as a vertical authoritarian structure of corporations. Mariátegui glimpsed how the triumph of fascism was inevitably destined to exacerbate the European and world crisis.

=== Influence ===
In different ways, organizations like Shining Path, and the Túpac Amaru Revolutionary Movement, and the Peruvian Communist Party all look to Mariátegui and his writings.

Mariátegui's ideas have recently seen a major revival due to the rise of leftist governments all over South America, in particular in Bolivia, where in 2005 Evo Morales became the first indigenous president since the Conquest 500 years earlier (second in Latin America following Mexico's Benito Juárez). The rise of popular indigenous movements in Ecuador and Peru have also sparked a renewed interest in Mariátegui's writings on the role of indigenous peoples in Latin American revolution. The ruling party in Peru from 2011 to 2016, the Peruvian Nationalist Party, claims Mariátegui as one of its ideological founders.

== Works ==
During his lifetime, Mariátegui published only two books (The Contemporary Scene and the Seven Interpretive Essays on Peruvian Reality), leaving two more unfinished and unpublished (The Morning Soul and Defense of Marxism published in 1950 and 1955, respectively, although much of them had already been published in the press). These works and his abundant journalism (articles, conferences, essays, and a short novel) have been edited by his heirs (his wife and his children) into 20 volumes. Among these volumes are two biographies of Mariátegui (by María Wiesse and by Armando Bazán), a summary of the content of Amauta magazine by Alberto Tauro del Pino, and a poetic anthology of various authors inspired by Mariátegui's life and work. Mariátegui's own work fills 16 of the volumes. Substantial work was produced from 1923 to 1930.

- The Heroic and Creative Meaning of Socialism José Carlos Mariátegui. Selected Essays. – Edited and Translated by Michael Pearlman. 1996 Humanities Press, New Jersey
- Seven Interpretive Essays on Peruvian Reality by José Carlos Mariátegui. University of Texas Press. 1997. ISBN 978-0292701151
