= Rosa Mercedes Riglos =

Peruvian writer

Rosa Mercedes Riglos de Orbegoso
- Rosa Mercedes Riglos
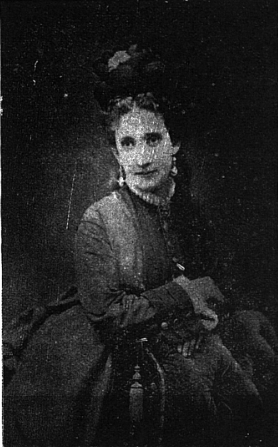
- A portrait photo of Rosa Mercedes Riglos
- Born: c. 1826; Lima, Peru
- Died: 1891 (aged 64–65); Lima, Peru
- Occupation: writer
- Known for: Organizing Juana Manuela Gorriti literary events

Rosa Mercedes Riglos (c. 1826–1891) was a Peruvian writer who was better known in some parts of Peru under her pseudonym of Beatriz. She was a member of the first generation of Peruvian women writers, and greatly influenced the Peruvian literary scene by organizing some of Juana Manuela Gorriti's literary events.

== Biography ==
Rosa Mercedes Riglos was born in Lima, Peru in about 1826. Her father was Jose de Riglos y La Salle and her mother Manuela de Rabago y Avella-Fuertes. Rosa married in 1847 with coronel don Pedro Jose de Orbegoso.

Rosa had an interest in history and journalism since her early years. She started writing over pedagogical, social, historical and literary questions. She was one of the first Peruvian women to take part of the development of a newspaper. Most of her literary and pedagogical work was published in the Peruvian daily newspapers El correo del Perú y El Perú Ilustrado.

She participated and organized many literary events. Those were mainly the ones sponsored by Juana Manuela Gorriti. In the literary events, the majority of participants were prominent thinkers, journalists or writers like Clorinda Matto, Mercedes Cabello, Carolina Freyre, and Juana Manuela.

== Literature style ==
Rosa Mercedes Riglos was always applauded loudly during literary events. The majority of her works can be found in the archived editions of El correo del Perú y El Perú Ilustrado newspapers. Aside from that her most famous piece of work remained "La libertad civil y la moral" which severely criticized some of society's moral and judicial principles at the time.
