= Carlota Garrido de la Peña =

Argentine journalist, writer and teacher (1870–1958)

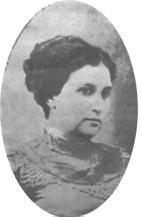
Carlota Garrido de la Peña

Carlota Garrido de la Peña (August 2, 1870 – July 19, 1958) was an Argentine journalist, writer and teacher, known for being the first female journalist from Santa Fe Province.

== Biography ==
Carlota Garrido was born in Mendoza, August 2, 1870. In her early teens, she settled in Coronda. In this city, she married Ángel de la Peña. She was widowed at age 26, and left alone to raise four children. Garrido then studied to be a teacher and worked in the Normal School of Rural Teachers of the city.

On June 15, 1895, Garrido founded the magazine El Pensamiento, which she directed during its existence. It was referred to as the "Week of enjoyable reading, customs, religious and social affairs, salon and fashion chronicles, bibliographies, etc." It ceased publication in an uncertain year in the 1900s. In this magazine, named as "the first publication directed by a woman in the province," the Peruvian Clorinda Matto de Turner, Carolina Freyre de Jaime, 3 and Margarita Praxedes Muñoz collaborated; Chilean Fiora Donoso Gioz; and Uruguayan Lola Larrosa de Ansaldo, as well as Macedonia Amavet, Mercedes Pujato Crespo, and Ángela Geneyro from Santa Fe.1 In 1902, together with Carolina Freyre, she founded La Revista Argentina (1902-1905).

As a journalist, she wrote articles for some of the largest newspapers in the country, such as Los Principios of Córdoba, La Nueva Época of Santa Fe, El Cívico of Salta, La Acción of Rosario and La Capital of Rosario and in other media such as the Revista del Consejo Nacional de Mujeres and Revista de Derecho, Historia y Letras de Buenos Aires, among others. She compiled all of the articles in her book Hojas dispersas (Scattered Leaves) (1920).

In 1913, she published her first book, Corazón Argentino - Diario de un niño, a novel made in imitation of Corazón, diario de un niño by Edmondo De Amicis, which was used for a long time in the school system, and had more than six editions. In 1917, she definitively abandoned teaching to dedicate herself to writing.

She also work for Semana Gráfica, a weekly magazine that was published between 1922 and 1924 and where she wrote together with personalities such as Gabriela Mistral or Alfonsina Storni, in the section "Temas de la sociedad - Entre nosotras" (Topics of society - Between us), later called "Temas femeninos - Entre nosotras" (Feminine topics - Between us), a clearly feminine section.

== Death and legacy ==
She died on July 19, 1958, in her adoptive town, Coronda.

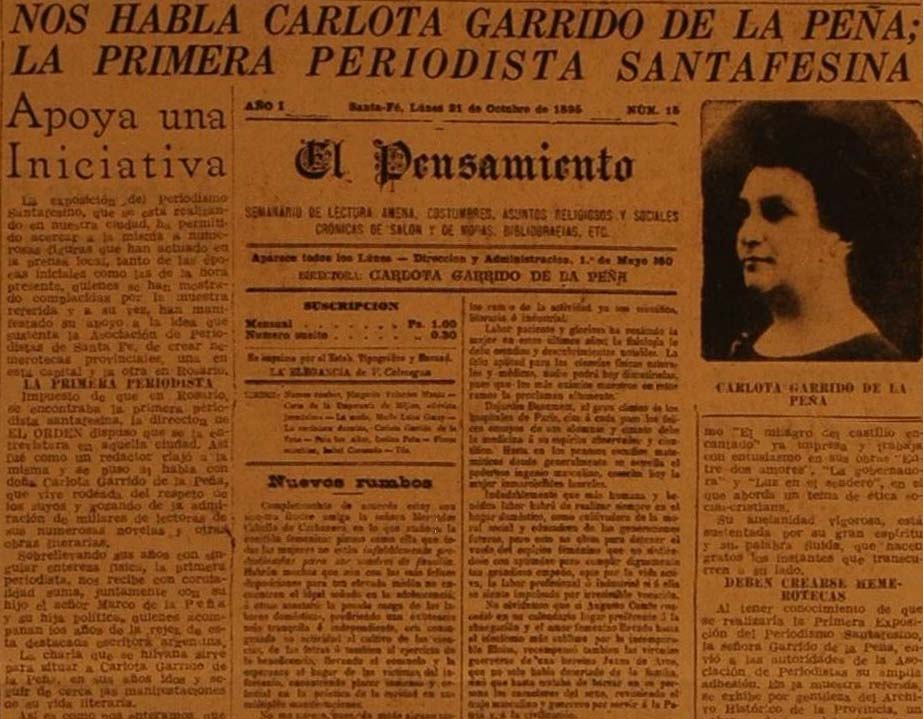
Edition No. 18 of the magazine El Pensamiento, in the newspaper El Orden.

It is the newspaper El Orden who original identified Garrido as "the first Santa Fe journalist" in 1951. As part of a study to create newspaper archives to protect the journalistic heritage of the city of Santa Fe, a journalist from the newspaper went to interview Garrido, who was 81 years old at the time and living in Rosario, in order to get her support. After this interview, the employees of the newspaper found out about the magazine El Pensamiento being the first publication directed by a woman in the province, and bestowed upon it public recognition.

Coronda State School No. 844 was named "Carlota Garrido de la Peña" in her honor.

== Literary style and themes ==
Garrido had a marked Catholic religious tendency, combining a reactionary attitude towards the new feminine attitudes and strongly conservative ideology, with her intention to reinforce values such as modesty, simplicity, purity, religious faith and patriotism. For her, the concept of woman was the same as that of mother. She was opposed to the suffrage movement, in thinking that Argentine women were not prepared for that responsibility. But she thought that as educators, women fulfill a fundamental function as pillars of the family, the basic organization of society. The same social rejection is identified with respect to transgressive fashion, such as the haircut below the ear, as an expression of moral decadence.

== Awards and honours ==
Her novel Entre dos amores received an award in Spain and Luz en el sendero earned her an honorable mention from Pope Pius XII.
