= Juana Manuela Gorriti =

Argentine writer (1818–1892)

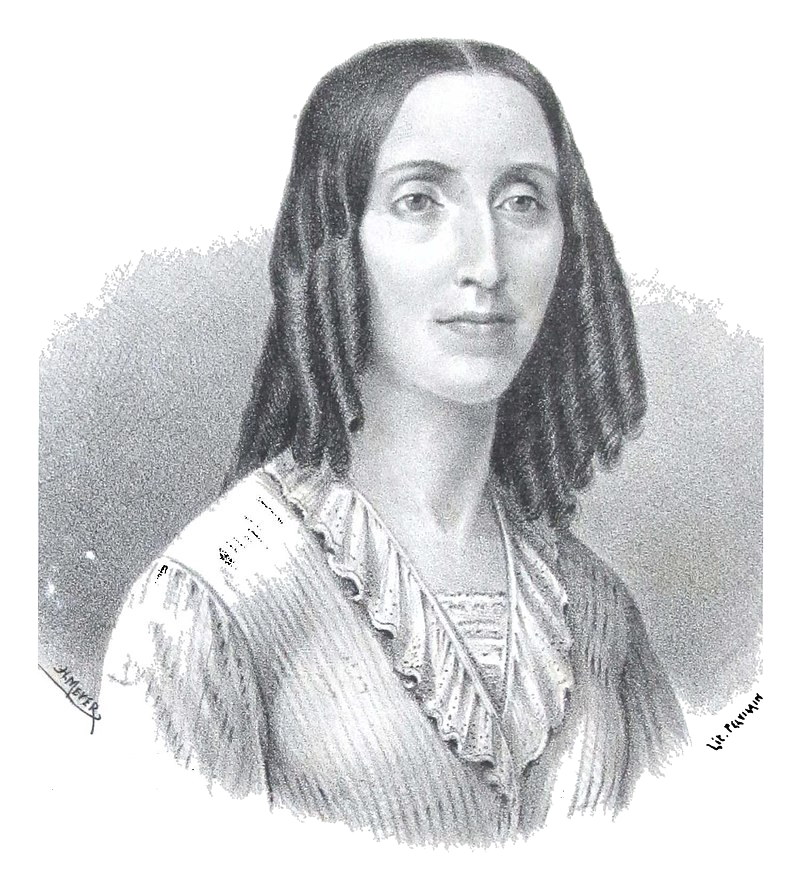

First Lady of Bolivia
- In role 6 December 1848 – 15 August 1855
- President: Manuel Isidoro Belzu
- Preceded by: Mercedes Coll
- Succeeded by: Edelmira Belzu

Personal details
- Born: Juana Manuela Gorriti Zuviría; 15 June 1818 Rosario de la Frontera, United Provinces of the Rio de la Plata
- Died: 6 November 1892 (aged 74) Buenos Aires, Argentina
- Spouse: Manuel Isidoro Belzu
- Children: Edelmira Belzu; Mercedes Belzu de Dorado
- Parent(s): José Ignacio Gorriti; Feleciana Zuviría
- Occupation: Writer

Juana Manuela Gorriti Zuviria (15 June 1818 – 6 November 1892) was an Argentine writer with extensive political and literary links to Bolivia and Peru. She held the position of First Lady of Bolivia from 1848 to 1855.

With the publication of La quena (1851), Gorriti became recognized as the earliest novelist in what would become Argentina. In La quena, Gorriti challenged the notion of poverty, ignorance, tyranny, and the oppression of women, writing, "A day shall come in which man's science will discover those treasures; but by then men will be free and equal, and they shall use wealth to serve humanity! The reign of worries and despotism will have ended, and only man's genius will rule the world, it reside upon the head of a European, or upon that of an Indian." Gorriti's commitment to women's issues sparked the interest of both women and men, including Abel Delgado. His essay, "La educación social de la mujer", ("The Social Education of Woman," 1892) discussed male and female spheres and justified women's participation in law and politics.

== Biography ==
Juana Manuela Gorriti was born on 15 June 1818, in Rosario de la Frontera, in the province of Salta in the north of Argentina. She came from a wealthy upper-class family and attended a convent school when she was eight. She was born to José Ignacio de Gorriti and Feleciana Zuviria. Her father was a politician and soldier, and signed the Argentine Declaration of Independence on 9 July 1816. She was also the niece of the infamous guerrilla Jose Francisco "Pachi" Gorriti. Her family supported the Unitarians during the politically challenging era of Juan Manuel de Rosas, a conservative governor of Buenos Aires Province. In 1831, when Gorriti was thirteen, the federal caudillo Facundo Quiroga forced Gorriti and much of her family into exile.

Goritti's family settled in Tarija, Bolivia, where she met her future husband, Manuel Isidro Belzú, who was a captain in the Bolivian Army at the time. They married when she was fifteen, and they had two daughters. As his career advanced, their marriage suffered, and he abandoned her in 1842 after nine years together. Gorriti did not receive the divorce papers until fourteen years later, after his assassination. After her return to Argentina, she died on 6 November 1892, in Buenos Aires at the age of 74.

== Salons ==
In Lima, the coastal city where she lived, she developed a name as an influential journalist and started to host tertulias on a regular basis. These salons would be attended by fashionable and mostly well-educated men and women, such as Ricardo Palma and Manuel González Prada, Mercedes Cabello de Carbonera, Clorinda Matto de Turner and Teresa González de Fanning. They would meet to discuss literature and social progress, themes that Gorriti felt passionate about and would include in much of her literature. Her tertulias, often described as salons for the intellectual elite, fostered discussions on literature, politics, and women's rights. These gatherings inspired works such as Teresa González de Fanning's essays advocating for female education and emancipation, highlighting their significant role in shaping feminist discourse in the region.

By organizing and hosting her tertulias, Gorriti provided a great opportunity for female writers to come together and discuss literature, progress, and the progress of women. Many of the attendees would later go on to write more about these subjects, including Teresa González de Fanning, who founded an enlightened women's movement.

== Women's rights ==
Gorriti was an ardent feminist before the term itself was invented, and her dedication to women's rights showed in many of her journals. Through her writings, she instructed and inspired women to take on the gender roles more commonly found in Europe and North America. Through ‘The Argentina Dawn’, Gorriti addressed issues such as women’s access to education and the importance of redefining domestic roles. In her article 'The Future of Women,' she argued for integrating women into intellectual and public life, advocating for equality through education and social reform. She wanted women to be heard, to educate themselves, and not be afraid to go against social norms. Gorriti redefines domestic spaces as sites of resistance, exploring how women could navigate societal expectations. Her narratives challenge traditional portrayals of gender roles, offering a progressive perspective on women’s autonomy and identity. Gorriti’s narratives frequently explored the intersections of race and gender, shedding light on the layered oppressions faced by women in 19th-century Latin America [7] In works such as ‘El Lucero de Maná’, she portrayed characters navigating societal constraints tied to gender and ethnicity, emphasizing the need for inclusivity in the feminist movement. Gorriti’s works also critiqued societal norms and cultural expectations surrounding women. For instance, in her writings on fashion and societal pressures, Gorriti questioned the emphasis on superficial appearances as a measure of female worth. Her essays often discussed intellectual achievements as the true indicators of women’s progress and emancipation.

== First Lady of Bolivia ==
Manuel Isidoro Belzú, husband to Gorriti, went on to become president of Bolivia in 1848. He survived an assassination attempt two years later and ruled for a further five years until retiring in 1855, having sponsored his son-in-law, Jorge Córdova, to succeed him. Córdova was overthrown in a coup d'état two years later and was succeeded by José María Linares, who in turn was ousted by his Minister of War, José María de Achá in 1861. Achá survived for three years until replaced, through another coup, by General Mariano Melgarejo. Belzú raised an army against Melgarejo who, according to unconfirmed rumours, invited him to the presidential palace and shot him during a fake embrace. He died on 23 March 1865.

== Battlefield nurse ==
In 1866, the Spanish Navy shelled ports on Peru's and Chile's coastlines, including the port of Lima, where Gorriti served as a battlefield nurse. Gorriti received a military honor from Peru for her heroic acts of saving injured Peruvian soldiers. She also risked her life evacuating the wounded when the Spanish surrendered at Callao. For her heroism, and Florence Nightingale-like actions, Gorriti was seen as a Peruvian freedom fighter and was awarded the Second Star of May by the Peruvian government. She wrote about these events in numerous articles and short stories, later collected and published in the Album of Lima founded by herself and her friend and fellow writer Carolina Freyre de Jaimes.

== Return to Argentina ==
In 1878, Gorriti returned to Argentina. Despite facing challenges such as divorce and exile, Gorriti remained a respected and influential figure, celebrated for her literary and social contributions. Gorriti became a mother to two daughters, Edelmira Belzu and Mercedes Belzu de Dorado. Her daughter Mercedes became sick in Peru in 1879, but Gorriti could not go to her because of the war between Chile and Peru over the provinces of Tacna and Arica. Mercedes died later that year. Gorriti also founded the newspaper The Argentina Dawn, in which she published many articles on the rights and education of women. When she died, Argentines hailed her as a famous, instructive, influential journalist of her day.

== Literary contributions ==
Gorriti left Bolivia for Peru, where her literary life would take off. When she initially arrived in Peru she had no financial support or resources. Gorriti founded an all-girls school in Bolivia, where she dedicated her life to teaching and writing. She was an ardent feminist, and it showed in many of her journals. Gorriti wrote several short novels and numerous short stories. Her novels include El Pozo de Yocci (The Yocci Well), a love story, ghost story and Gothic horror rolled into one, set in one of the most critical periods in the history of the Argentine Republic, contrasting the idealistic patriotism behind the War of Independence with the savagery of the civil wars that followed. This was followed by La oasis de la vida (The Oasis of Life), a melodramatic novel written in the 1880s. La tierra natal (The Native Land), her last major work, published in 1889, relates a physical journey through northern Argentina, back to the places where she had lived over the course of her lifetime, as well as a voyage back through her memories of the people and events she had known and experienced along the way.

Two of her most famous short stories are La hija del mazorquero and El lucero de manantial; both are melodramatic tales with a strong anti-Rosista political message. These are powerful examples of how literature intertwines with political critique. Both works are set in melodrama, a hallmark of Gorriti's style, and serve as allegories for Argentina's national identity during the controversial regime of Juan Manuel de Rosas (1829–1852).

In La hija del mazorquero, Gorriti critiques the brutal methods and authoritarian governance associated with Rosas, particularly through the depiction of characters tied to the "mazorca" (Rosas' secret police). Similarly, El lucero de manantial uses symbolic imagery and dramatic narrative to show the corruption under Rosas' rule. Gorriti was not only a literary figure but also a voice of resistance.

Gorriti also founded the newspaper The Dawn of Argentina (La Alborada del Plata) with fellow poet Numa Pompilio Llona.

Her intermittent three-year stay in Lima resulted in the publication of La Quena, a short but influential novella, in the prestigious newspaper El Comercio. Later, as Peruvian politics began to stabilize, she contributed to the Revista de Lima with stories like El Angel Caido and Si haces mal no esperes bien.

Gorriti's stories are finely crafted and bear witness to trends in South American literature of the 19th century.

== Principal works ==
=== Novels ===
- El pozo de Yocci (1869)
- Oasis en la Vida (1888)
- La tierra natal (1889)

=== Novellas, short stories, and miscellaneous writings ===
- Sueños y realidades (1865)
- Panoramas de la vida (1876)
- Misceláneas (1878)
- El mundo de los recuerdos (1886)

=== English translations of her work ===
- Dreams and Realities translated by Sergio Waisman, OUP USA, 2003.
- The Yocci Well translated by Kathryn Phillips-Miles, The Clapton Press, London, 2020.
- Our Native Land translated by Kathryn Phillips-Miles, The Clapton Press, London, 2021.
