= Carolina Freyre =

Peruvian poet, playwright, and novelist (1844–1916)

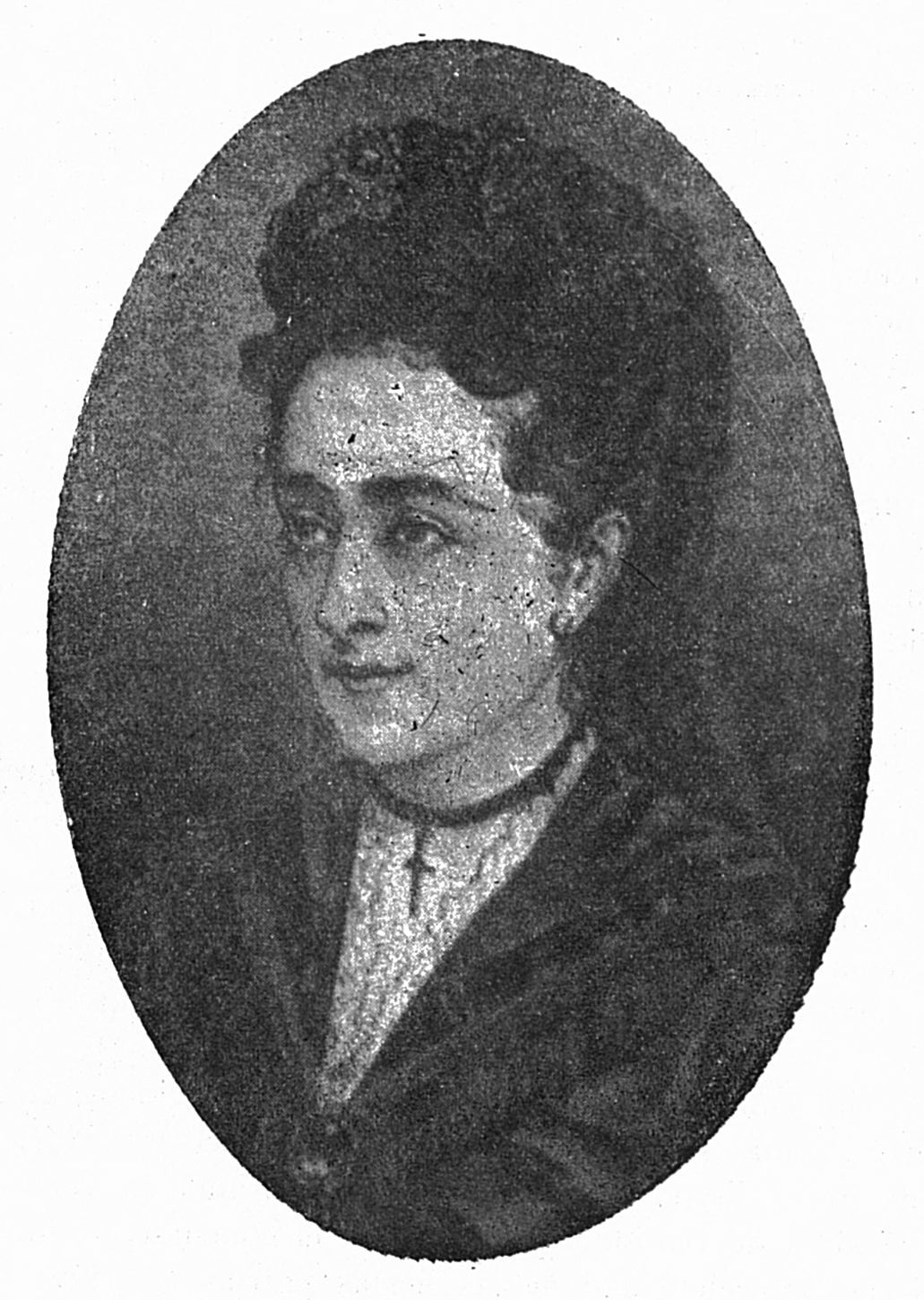
- Born: 4 January 1844; Tacna
- Died: 29 May 1916 (aged 72); Buenos Aires
- Occupation: Writer
- Spouse(s): Julio Lucas Jaimes
- Children: Ricardo Jaimes Freyre

Carolina Freyre Arias (January 4, 1844 – May 29, 1916), also known as Carolina Freyre de Jaimes, was a Peruvian poet, playwright, and novelist. She is considered a pioneer among Latin American women journalists.

== Early life ==
Freyre was born in 1844 in Tacna, a city in southern Peru. She was one of six children born to Juana Arias and Andrés Freyre Fernández. Her father was the director of several newspapers and the owner of a printing house.

She studied at the Colegio Nacional de Educandas de Tacna, a school where young women learned to become teachers, and at a very young age she became a math teacher.

Her writing career also began very early; she published her first verses of poetry at only 14 years of age, in one of her father's newspapers.

== Career ==
Carolina Freyre was active in Lima's veladas literarias (literary soirees) in the 1870s.

Freyre began contributing to various publications including La Bella Taceña and La América, writing on social issues in particular. In 1871 she began writing for El Correo de Lima, publishing articles on "The Scientific Spirit of the Century," "Women's Education," etc. The following year, she began contributing opinion pieces to the newspaper La Prensa, as well as historical essays.

She went on to found a new publication, Cofradía Lírica, in collaboration with other young writers. It was later known as Bohemia Tacneña.

Having settled in Lima, Freyre became part of the city's intellectual social scene established in the 1870s, joining a group of women writers led by Teresa González de Fanning from Ancash, Mercedes Cabello from Moquegua, and Clorinda Matto from Cusco. The group was established through a variety of cultural spaces, particularly the literary soirees held in the home of the Argentine writer Juana Manuela Gorriti. In addition to these women, Freyre befriended the Peruvian intellectual Ricardo Palma, whom she may have met at one of Gorriti's soirees.

On May 23, 1874, along with Gorriti, she launched the first edition of El Álbum, described as "a weekly magazine for the fair sex." El Álbum was the first women's magazine led by women themselves in Peru. Freyre directed the magazine alongside Gorriti for the first 16 issues, after which she assumed full responsibility for the publication. She also transferred her long-running column "Revista de Lima," which had previously appeared in the newspaper La Patria, to El Álbum. Beyond her work on this magazine, she also published frequently in the magazine La Alborada, which Gorriti founded with Numa Pompilio Llona in 1875.

Freyre frequently advocated for women's rights in her work, as part of Peru's early feminist movement, although her calls for women's education did not extend to fully liberating women from the domestic sphere.

== Personal life ==
Carolina Freyre was married to the Bolivian writer Julio Lucas Jaimes, nicknamed "Brocha Gorda," with whom she had six children: Julio, Ricardo, Federico, María Carolina, Julia Rosa, and Raúl. Her second son, Ricardo Jaimes Freyre, became a well-known poet.

She lived throughout her life in Tacna, Lima, Sucre, and Buenos Aires. Her family resided in Tacna during part of the Chilean occupation of that area. Her brother Andrés Freyre Arias was an important figure during the War of the Pacific and worked alongside Carolina and her father on the family's editorial and journalistic endeavors, which had a significant cultural influence in Tacna.

== Death and legacy ==
Freyre died in 1916, in Buenos Aires. A street in her hometown of Tacna was named in her honor.

== Selected works ==
=== Poetry ===
- La bella tacneña, 1860
- Amigo Federico, 1887

=== Novel ===
- El regalo de boda, 1887

=== Theater ===
- María de Bellido, 1877
- Blanca de Silva, 1879
- Pizarro
