= La Alborada del Plata =

La Alborada del Plata was an Argentinian cultural journal devoted to the "science, literature and poetry of the New World. Founded by sociologist and journalist Juana Manuela Gorriti and Josefina Pelliza,. The journal was published from 1877 to 1878, and briefly restarted in 1880 as La Alborada literaria del Plata.

The journal's first editorial announced that La Alborada would have an international character and circulation, integrating Argentinian culture with that of other republics in Latin America. Domingo Faustino Sarmiento declined Gorriti's invitation to contribute to the new journal, and Gorriti published his polite refusal. Contributors to the journal included Mercedes Cabello de Carbonera, Florencio Escardó and Lola Larrosa de Ansaldo.
