= Lastenia Larriva =

Peruvian poet, writer and journalist (1848–1924)

Micaela Lastenia Larriva
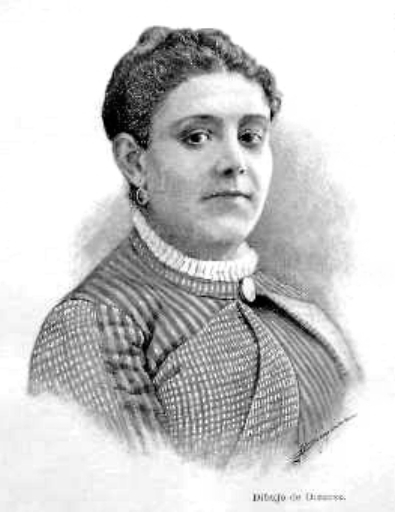
- Lastenia Larriva
- Born: Micaela; May 6, 1848; Lima
- Died: September 24, 1924 (aged 76); Lima
- Occupations: Poet, writer, and journalist
- Spouse(s): Numa Pompilio Llona, Adolfo De La Jara y Bermúdez
- Children: Adriana Sofía de la Jara y Larriva, María Eugenia de la Jara y Larriva, Carlos Adolfo Leonardo de la Jara y Larriva, Clemencia Adriana de la Jara y Larriva, Rosa Lastenia de la Jara y Larriva, Pablo Emilio Llona Larriva.
- Writing career
- Language: Spanish
- Notable work: Un drama singular o historia de una familia
- Movement: Feminism

Lastenia Larriva y Negron de Llona also known as "Lastenia Larriva De La Jara" (May 6, 1848 — September 24, 1924) was a Peruvian poet, writer, and journalist.

== Biography ==
Larriva's birthplace is Lima, where she also died. However, she lived for several years in Guayaquil, Ecuador, where she did most of her writing. Together with Carolina Freyre de Jaimes, she was among the first generation of Peruvian female writers who overcame the criticism and prejudice of the society of her time. She combatted the primitive belief that women should be traditional housewives and not pursue any sort of profession. This concept in the 1800s was considered ahead of her time. Upon her death, it was said: "She was a watchtower of feminism in America. Of advanced ideas, of noble and delicate features, of exquisite culture, of innate goodness, and of a warm heart.” Lastenia Larriva outlived her second husband, the Ecuadorian poet Numa Pompilio Llona (1832-1907), who was one of the most popular and well-read poets in Ecuador at the time. Her first husband, Adolfo De La Jara Bermúdez died in a battle between Peru and Chile (Miraflores war Jan. 15th, 1881). She built a connection with her second husband, based on poetry and being a widower/widow alike. Amidst the mourning, they found partnership and comfort.

== Literary works ==
- Un drama singular o historia de una familia (1888 y 1920), a novel.
- La Ciencia y la Fe (1889), a decalogue in the form of poems, written at the request of the mothers of the Sacred Heart School of Guayaquil.
- Pro Patria. Respuesta al romance "Sucre" de José Antonio Calcaño (1890), a short novel.
- Fe, patria y hogar (1902), poems.
- Cartas a mi hijo. Psicología de la mujer (1919).
- Cuentos (1919).

== Sources ==
- Lastenia Larriva y Negron
- Pérez Pimentel, Rodolfo: Diccionario Biográfico del Ecuador.
