= Bible translations into Native South American languages =

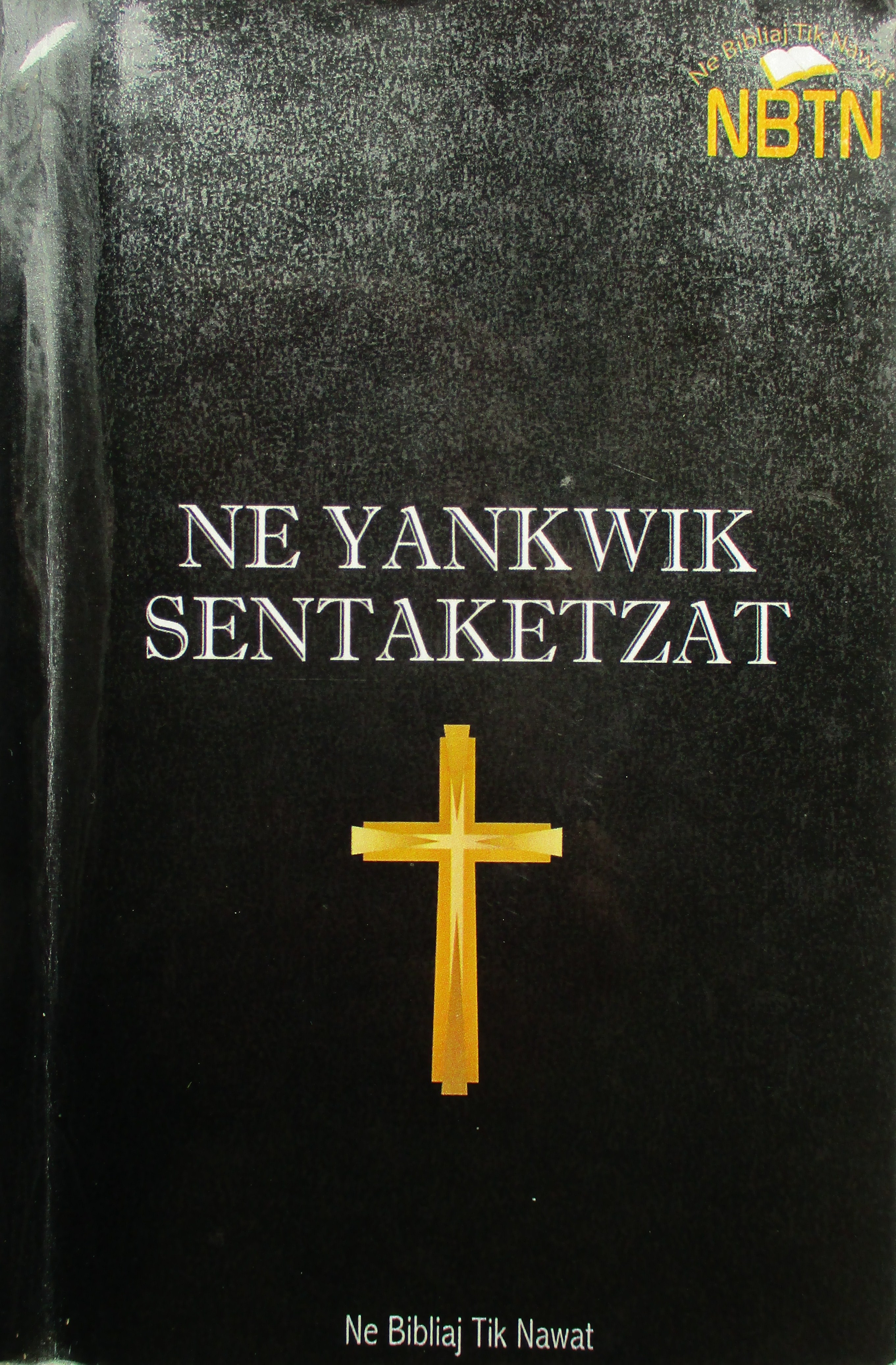
Cover of The Bible in Nawat. Translated by Alan R. King, 2011.

== Cariban languages ==
=== Kuikúro-Kalapálo ===
Luke was translated into the Kuikuro language by missionaries with Worldwinds International. It was completed in 2007.

== Aymara ==
The Gospel of Luke in Aymara, translated by Vicente Pazos Kanki, a former priest from Upper Peru, in cooperation with the Scottish baptist pastor James Thompson, was published in 1828, which was the first publication of a whole book of the Bible in a Native American language. The first translation of the New Testament appeared in 1954, and the translation of the whole Bible into Aymara was published the first time in 1986, second time in 1997. A modernized edition in the contemporary orthography and with deuterocanonicals appeared in 2003.

Aymara Bible editions from both 1997 and 2011 have been accessible on Bible portals since about 2012.

== Quechuan languages ==
The Catechism and the Doctrina christiana were published in 1584, shortly after Spanish conquest, in a version in Quechua and Aymara approved by the Council of Lima (Ciudad de los Reyes) in 1583, but attempts to translate the Bible into these languages were suppressed by the Spanish authorities and the Catholic Church. Only in the 19th century missionaries began to translate the New Testament into Quechua. In 1822 the Scottish baptist pastor James Thompson planned to translate the whole Bible into Quechua and Aymara. During the Peruvian war of independence he was called by José de San Martín to Peru in 1822. From 1822 to 1824 together with a team of four translators he translated the New Testament into Quechua, but due to the war the manuscript was lost in 1825. So the first book of the Bible to be published in Quechua was the Gospel of John in Classical Quechua in 1880. At the beginning of the 20th century, Clorinda Matto (1852–1909), a writer from Cuzco living in Buenos Aires, translated the four Gospels, the Acts of the Apostles and the Epistle to the Romans from Spanish into Cusco Quechua, published between 1901 and 1904. In 1907 and 1915, revised versions followed. Between 1917 and 1929, parts of the Bible in South Bolivian Quechua and Spanish were published: a bilingual Quechua-Spanish edition of the four Gospels in 1917, a bilingual New Testament in 1922 and the Psalms in 1929. A new edition of the New Testament in Bolivian Quechua appeared in 1977.

In 1923 the first translation of the four Gospels into a Central Quechua dialect appeared in Huallaga Quechua in Peru. In the Ayacucho Region the Presbyterian Quechua pastor and songwriter Florencio Segura, author of an extensive Christian Quechua songbook, which appeared in several editions, translated the Gospel of John, published in 1954 in Ayacucho Quechua. In the same year the Gospel of Luke, translated under the guidance of the Presbyterian pastor Homer Emerson into Ayacucho Quechua, was printed. In Peru, the first Quechua translation of the New Testament was published in 1947 in Cusco Quechua. Translations followed in Ayacucho Quechua in 1958 and 1981, and in Cusco Quechua 1986. The first translation of the New Testament into Quichua of Ecuador was published in 1954.

It was not until the last quarter of the 20th century that translations of the whole Bible from Hebrew and Greek into Quechua were done, but since then several Quechua Bible translations have been completed. Most work has been done by Protestant groups with international support, but two Catholic translations have also appeared. The first translation of the whole Old and New Testament into Quechua, but without deuterocanonicals, was published in 1986 in Bolivian Quechua. In the Ayacucho Region, the Quechua pastor and translator Rómulo Sauñe Quicaña was the first to give way to a whole Bible translation in Peru, which appeared 1987 in Ayacucho Quechua. For his translation from Hebrew, Sauñe traveled to Israel. In 1992 he was murdered by terrorists of the Shining Path, together with three companions. In 1988 the first translation of the whole Bible into Cusco Quechua, jointly sponsored by the Catholic Church and Protestant groups, was published. In Ecuador, Bible translations into three Kichwa varieties appeared in 1989 (Chimborazo), 1994 (Imbabura), and 2010 (Cañar). In 1996, an interconfessional team published a new edition of the Bolivian Quechua Bible, and in 2004 an extended edition with the deuterocanonicals appeared. In 2010 the first Bible translation into a Central Quechua variety was published, namely Huallaga Quechua, which was realized under the guidance of the Wycliffe Translator and linguist David Weber of SIL International.

Within the Roman Catholic Church, two translations of the whole Bible including the Deuterocanonicals into Quechua and Kichwa have been done, both published as bilingual Quechua-Spanish editions. In contrast to the other Bible translations into Quechua, no reference to a specific variety (language according to SIL International) has been made. First Catholic translations of the four Gospels were published as bilingual Quechua-Spanish editions in 1972 in Quichua of Ecuador, translated under the guidance of the bishop of Riobamba, Leonidas Proaño, and, including the Acts of the Apostles, in 1974 in Quechua of Southern Peru, translated under the bishops of Abancay and Huancavelica, Enrique Pélach y Feliu and William Dermott Molloy McDermott. In 1973 the Catholic missionary Bernarda Ortiz (“Coronita”), later the Salesian priest Antonio Brescuani and the Jesuits Miguel and Francisco Ramos in cooperation with indigenous Christians speaking several dialects of Kichwa, started in Latacunga to translate the Bible into Kichwa of Ecuador. In 1997 the result of their work was published in Madrid as a bilingual Kichwa-Spanish Bible. In Peru, the Catholic priest Mons. Florencio Coronado in Huancavelica translated the Bible into Quechua, which appeared in 2002 as a bilingual edition, with the support of the bishop of Huancavelica Mons. Dermott Molloy. In contrast to other modern translators, Coronado used the New Vulgate for his translation. Both these Catholic translations are written in a Hispanic orthography. There is also a translation of the four Gospels by the priests of the Congregation of the Sacred Hearts of Jesus and Mary (province of Peru) Hilario Huanca Mamani und Hermann Wendling into Puno Quechua of 2007.

Most Quechua Bible translations have been accessible on various internet Bible portals since about 2012, e.g. Quechua editions for Bolivia, Ayacucho, Cusco, and Ecuador, but neither the Deuterocanonicals nor the Catholic translations. The Bible in Ayacucho Quechua (1987), in Huallaga Quechua (2011) and several Quechua translations of the New Testament by the Wycliffe Translators are also accessible as PDF (under copyright).

Now there are translations of the complete Bible into six specific Quechuan languages, according to Ethnologue, and two additional translations into Quechua and Kichwa, respectively, without specification. The deuterocanonicals have been included into three of these translations:

- South Bolivian Quechua 1986, revision: 1997, 2004 with deuterocanocicals (NT: 1922), SBB/SBU
- Ayacucho Quechua 1987, revision: 2013 (NT: 1958), SBP/SBU
- Cusco Quechua 1988, revision: 2004 (NT: 1947), SBP/SBU
- Chimborazo Kichwa 1989, revision: 2010 (NT: 1954), SBE/SBU
- Imbabura Kichwa 1994 (NT: 1976), SBE/SBU
- Kañari Kichwa 2011, SBE/SBU
- Huallaga Quechua (Huánuco) 2011 (NT: 2010), Wycliffe
- Kichwa of Ecuador 1997, with deuterocanocicals, Salesians (cath.)
- (Southern) Quechua 2002, with deuterocanocicals, diocese of Huancavelica, Peru (cath.)

Additionally, there are translations of the New Testament into at least 17 Quechuan languages.

=== Southern Quechua ===
==== Quechua of Peru (Southern), without specification ====
2002 Old and New Testament

==== Ayacucho Quechua (quy) ====
1958 New Testament: "Señorninchik Jesucristopa, Musuq Testamenton", Published by Sociedades Bíblicas en América Latina [offices in 14 cities of Latin America]. A copy bought in Lima, Peru, shows on reverse of title page: "Quechua de Ayacucho y Español, N.T.#285PDI, ABS-1965-1M-3M-T". ABS-1965 identifies the American Bible Society, and 1965 is the year of publication/printing; the code after that indicates number of copies printed. Neither a copyright notice nor an official publication date is shown in the book; the Christian societies that publish these examples of scripture are amenable to having some or part of the work copied and distributed without formal permission from the original publisher. An 18cm x 13cm booklet -- 8 color maps of the "ancient biblical world" with index of place names -- is inserted and bound into the book after the final printed page (p740).

1987 Old and New Testament.

==== Cuzco Quechua (quz) ====
1947 New Testament, 1988 and 2004 Old and New Testament

==== North Bolivian Quechua (qul) ====
2006 New Testament

==== South Bolivian Quechua (quh) ====
1922 New Testament, 1993, 1997 and 2004 Old and New Testament

=== Yungay Quechua ===
==== Cajamarca Quechua (qvc) ====
2004 New Testament

==== Lambayeque Quechua (quf) ====
2004 New Testament

=== Kichwa ===
==== Quichua of Ecuador, without specification ====
1997 Old and New Testament

==== Cañar Quichua (qxr) ====
2011 Old and New Testament

==== Chimborazo Quichua (qug) ====
1954 New Testament, 1989 and 2000 Old and New Testament

==== Imbabura Quichua (qvi) ====
1976 New Testament, 1994 Old and New Testament

==== Inga of Colombia (inb) ====
1996 New Testament

==== San Martin Quechua (qvs) ====
1992 New Testament

==== Southern Pastaza Quechua (qup) ====
1997 New Testament

=== Central Quechua ===
==== Huallaga Quechua (qub) ====
2011 Old and New Testament

==== Huamalíes-Dos de Mayo Quechua (qvh) ====
2003 New Testament

2019 Old and New Testament

==== Huaylas Quechua (qwh) ====
2007 New Testament

2019 Old and New Testament

==== Huaylla Huanca Quechua (qvw) ====
2006 New Testament

==== Margos-Yarowilca-Lauricocha Quechua (qvm) ====
2008 New Testament

2019 Old and New Testament

==== North Junin Quechua (qvn) ====
1997 New Testament

==== Northern Conchucos Ancash Quechua (qxn) ====
2006 New Testament

2019 Old and New Testament

==== Panao Huanuco Quechua (qxh) ====
2010 New Testament

==== Southern Conchucos Ancash Quechua (qxo) ====
2002 New Testament

2019 Old and New Testament

== Tupian languages ==
=== Guaraní ===
The translation of the Bible into Guaraní language is known as Ñandejara Ñe'ê.

=== Tembé ===
Paulo and Quézia Oliveira have translated the New Testament and portions of the Old Testament into the Tembé language. Luke was published in November 2008 and the whole New Testament is currently being published.

=== Gavião do Jiparaná ===
Horst Stute's translation of Mark was published by New Tribes Mission in 1988 followed by Thessalonians in 1991.

== Language Isolates ==
=== Huaorani ===
Rachel Saint, an American, translated into Huaorani language (language isolate) of Ecuador and Peru.

Translation	John (Wäö) 3:16
Wycliffe 2009	"Edæ Wængonguï incæ inguipoga quëwënäni ïnänite në waadete pönengä inte tömengä Wengä adocanque onguïñængä ïñongante pönongä pongacäimpa. Ïninque æcänö tömengä ingante në wede pönëna ïñömö tömengä wë womönämaï inte cöwë wænämaï quëwencæcäimpa
