= Creetown =

Town in Dumfries and Galloway, Scotland

Coordinates: 54.9°N 4.383333°W

Creetown: Scots: Creetoun
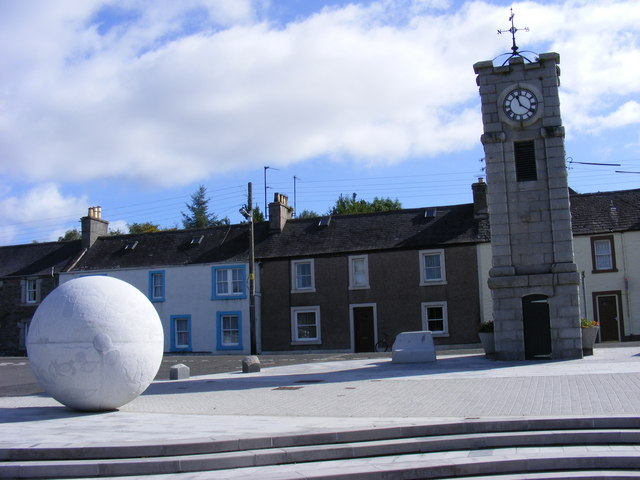
- Adamson Square, Creetown

- Location within Dumfries and Galloway
- Population: 660 (2020)
- Council area: Dumfries and Galloway
- Country: Scotland
- Sovereign state: United Kingdom
- Post town: NEWTON STEWART
- Postcode district: DG8
- Police: Scotland
- Fire: Scottish
- Ambulance: Scottish
- UK Parliament: Dumfries and Galloway
- Scottish Parliament: Galloway and West Dumfries

Creetown (/ˈkriːtən/, also /ˈkriːtaʊn/) is a small seaside town in the Stewartry of Kirkcudbright, in Galloway in the Dumfries and Galloway council area in south-west Scotland. Its population is about 750 people. It is situated near the head of Wigtown Bay, 18 miles (29 km) west of Castle Douglas. The town was originally named Ferrytown of Cree (Scottish Gaelic: Port Aiseig a' Chrìch) as it formed one end of a ferry route that took pilgrims across the River Cree estuary to the shrine of St Ninian at Whithorn. This is why the local football team, formed in 1895, are known as "The Ferrytoun".

Creetown was formerly served by the Portpatrick and Wigtownshire Railway. The granite quarries in the vicinity constituted the leading industry from about 1830 to 1900, the stone for the Liverpool docks and other public works having been obtained from them. The village dates from 1785, and became a burgh of barony in 1792. Sir Walter Scott laid part of the scene of the novel Guy Mannering in this neighbourhood.

John Knox stayed at Barholm Castle as guest of the MacCullochs of Barholm in 1566 while on a preaching tour of Galloway. John Keats and his friend Charles Armitage Brown stayed at an inn here on their walking tour of Scotland in 1818. The clock tower commemorates Queen Victoria's Diamond Jubilee in 1897. The Ellangowan Hotel was used to portray the interior of the Green Man pub in Robin Hardy's film, The Wicker Man 1973.

Dr Thomas Brown, the metaphysician (1778–1820), was a native of the parish in which Creetown lies.

James Thompson (1788-1854) pastor was born in Creetown, the son of William Thomson and Janet Burnett, belonging to a family that professed the Presbyterian religion.

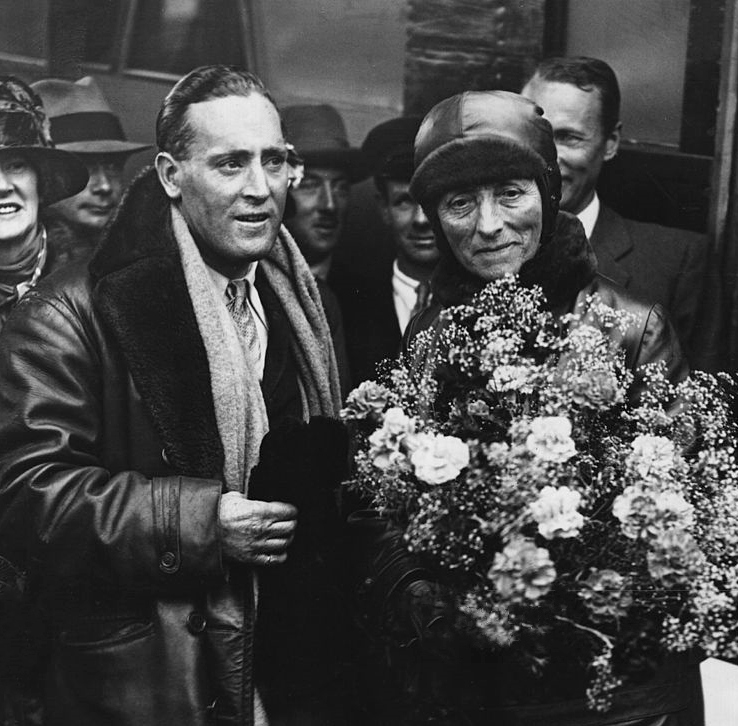
"The Flying Duchess " in 1929

Mary Duchess of Bedford, "The Flying Duchess", maintained a permanent landing ground (AA Approved) from about 1926, used when travelling to her home, nearby Cairnsmore House.

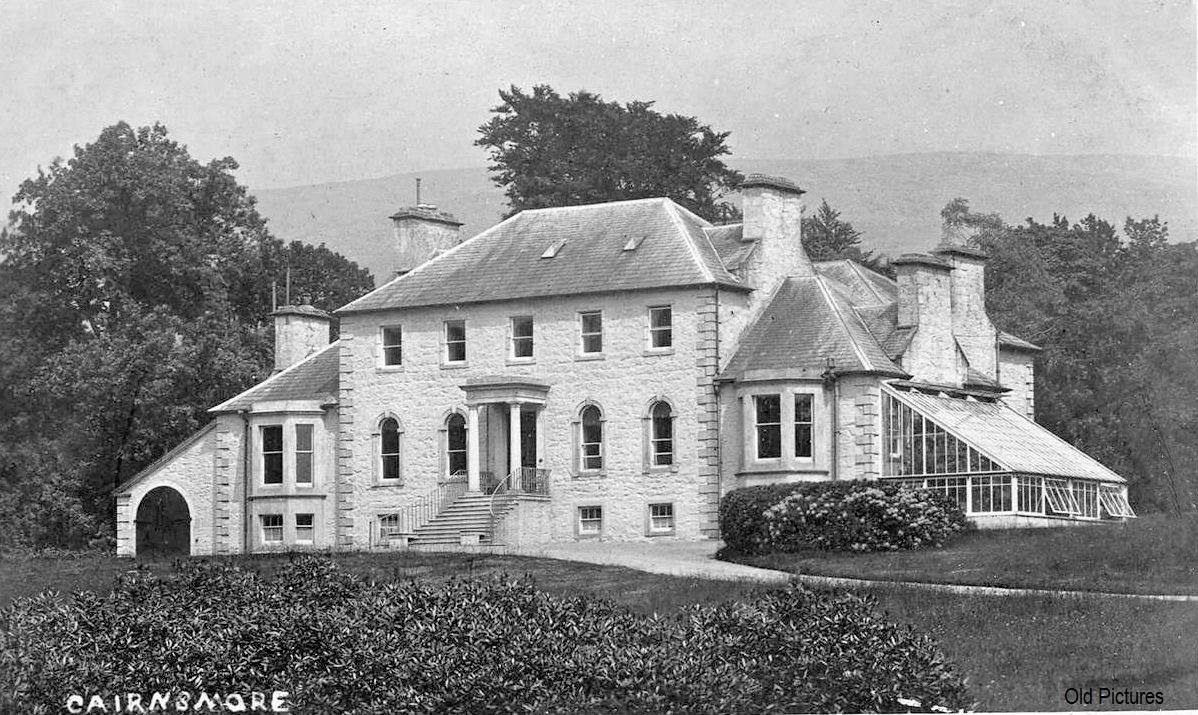
Cairnsmore House, built 1740.

Hideo Furuta (1949-2007) was a Japanese sculptor, born in Hiroshima, who settled at Creetown. He worked the Creetown granite from the disused Kirkmabreck Quarry. His work can be seen in the redesign of Adamson Square.

== Creetown Heritage Centre ==
The Creetown Heritage Museum is a community-based resource detailing and recording the cultural, industrial and natural history of Creetown and the surrounding area. It is run by a small volunteer committee who are constantly seeking to add to the collections of photographs, tools and artifacts from current and past village life.

Another ongoing project is the Oral History Project. Senior members of the community have been invited to relate their memories of Creetown during their lifetimes. The project has become a vital source of information and will be collated and documented for the future as a living reference to Creetown over the last 70 years.

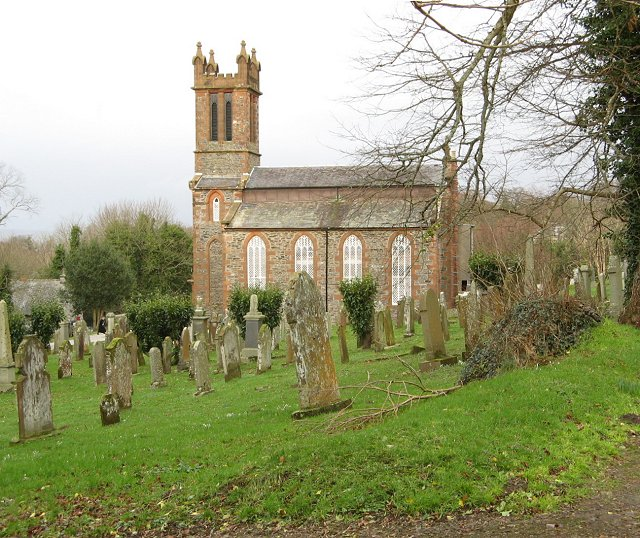
Kirkmabreck Church

== Balloch Wood Community Project ==
The Balloch Wood Community Project arose from an approach by Forestry Commission Scotland in 2001 to develop Balloch Wood as a community asset. Over the following three years a great deal was achieved. The first of several new paths has been opened, which will eventually lead to a new network of walks extending outwards into the surrounding hills from the village.

The new paths start less than 200m from Kirkmabreck Church and follow the Balloch Burn to the Mid Burn and then back down the centre of the woodland to the entrance. These paths have been added to by a new link path through the ancient woodland to the completed Curling Pond wildlife area. It is planned that a further path along the burnside to the Balloch Bridge will be developed in time to create a circular route.

At the Curling Pond, an all-abilities path has been constructed around and, between the ponds. A small car park has also been completed for the use of the less able.

It is hoped that local schools and other groups will use the ancient woodland as an open classroom to the benefit of the young people of the area. There is also the intention to introduce woodland sculptures and other significant artistic works which anyone can offer to be involved in.

== Creetown Football Club ==
Creetown F.C. is a football club based in Creetown. Formed in 1905 as Creetown Rifle Volunteers Football Club, they adopted their present name in 1920. They originally played their home matches at Barholm Park, which had been the ground of Barholm Rovers, who disbanded in 1905. They now play their home matches at Castlecary Park.

== Transport ==
Buses are run by Houston’s Minicoaches.
