= Manuel González Prada =

Peruvian politician (1844–1918)

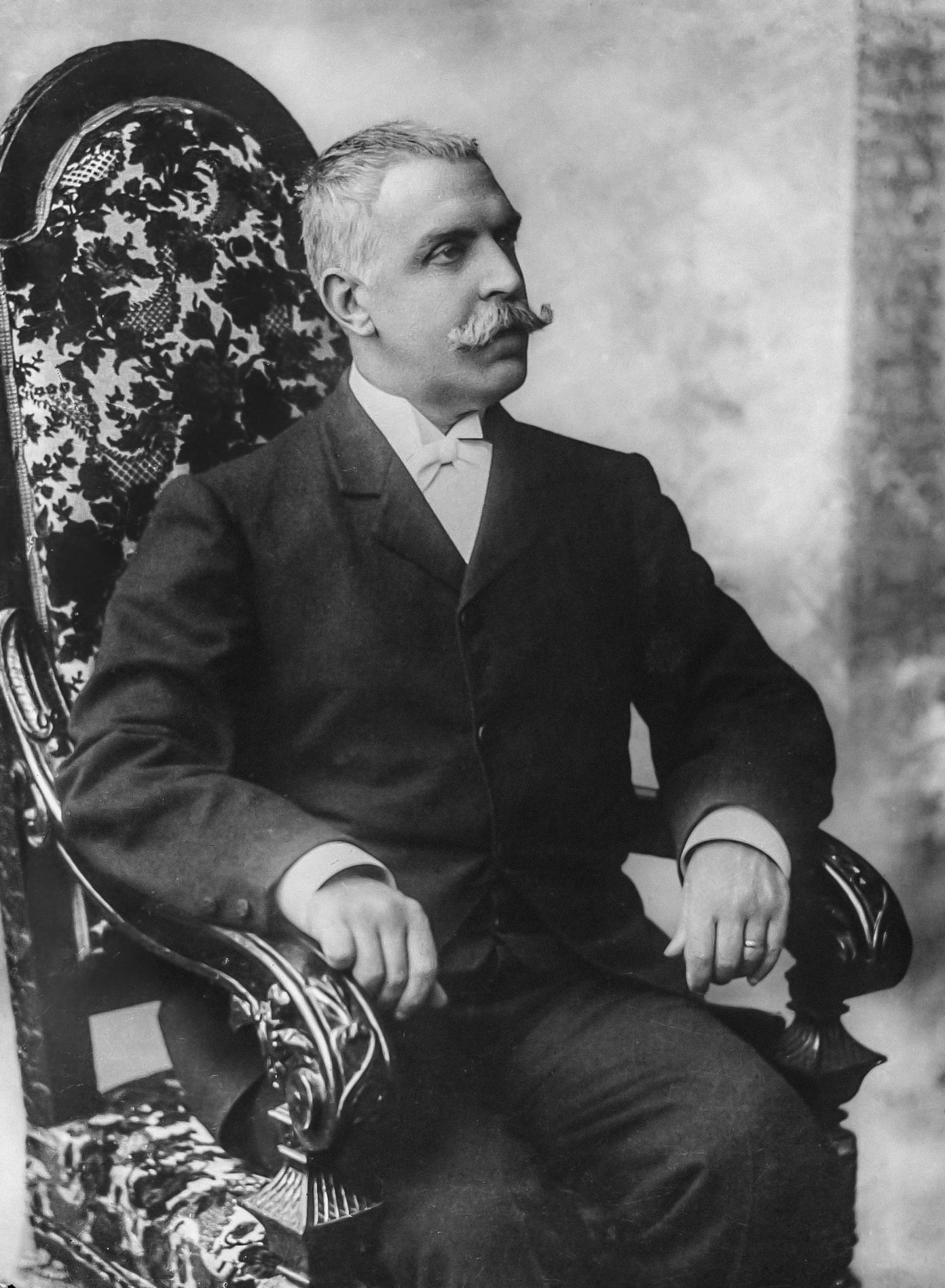
- Born: 5 January 1844; Lima, Peru
- Died: 22 July 1918 (aged 74); Lima, Peru
- Burial place: Cementerio Presbítero Matías Maestro; 12.042852552053436°S 77.00957408578998°W
- Education: Real Convictorio de San Carlos
- Known for: Influences on indigenismo and Peruvian nationalism
- Political party: National Union

Jose Manuel de los Reyes González de Prada y Ulloa (Lima, 5 January 1844 – Lima, 22 July 1918) was a Peruvian politician and anarchist, literary critic and director of the National Library of Peru. The first writer to criticize the oligarchy within Peru, he is well remembered as a social critic who helped develop Peruvian intellectual thought in the early twentieth century, as well as the academic style known as modernismo.

He was born into the aristocratic class. He was close in spirit to Clorinda Matto de Turner whose first novel, Torn from the Nest approached political indigenismo, and to Mercedes Cabello de Carbonera, who like González Prada, practiced a positivism sui generis.

== Early life ==
González Prada was born on 5 January 1844, in Lima to a wealthy, conservative, aristocratic Spanish family. His father was the judge and politician Francisco González de Prada Marrón y Lombrera, who served as Member of the Superior Court of Justice of Lima and Mayor of Lima. His mother was María Josefa Álvarez de Ulloa y Rodríguez de la Rosa. His grandfather was an important administrative figure in the Viceroyalty of Peru.

Due to the political exile of his father, the family temporarily settled down in Valpariso, where he started his education at an English school. During his youth, González Prada removed the "de" portion of his name in repudiation of his family's aristocratic background. He would go on to live much of his life in Lima, living in a city full of Spanish traditions and conservatism, though he became estranged from much of his family.

== Biography ==
=== Travel in south, solitude ===
For a period of time, González Prada traveled through Southern Peru, especially near Cerro de Pasco, where he met with peasants and some of the indigenous peoples of Peru, developing an opposition to centralismo in Lima. Following the death of his father in 1863, González Prada moved to a hacienda of his family in Tutumo until 1869. During this period of solitude, he experimented with a chemistry lab while developing a profitable starch compound, became a more improved poet and received political literature from Europe that would go on to influence his views.

=== War of the Pacific ===
In 1879, González Prada released Cuartos de hora just prior to Chile's invasion of Peru, attacking the ruling class and Catholic Church. During Peru's impending defeat by Chile in the War of the Pacific, González Prada stayed in his home for three years, refusing to look at the foreign invaders occupying Peru. The conflict proved to him that Peru was a failure under the economic oligarchy and that large reforms were necessary to improve the nation. He identified businessmen, clergy, military leaders and politicians as the upper class, saying that their wealth and power was gained through crony capitalism. González Prada saw the political elites in two fashions; the civilian elite who stole public funds through special interest groups and the militaristic caudillos who plundered state coffers blatantly. To enforce this system, he said that the elites utilized political repression through the police and military. Culturally, he said the elites were foreign to the majority of Peruvians since they adopted Spanish customs and continued colonial practices, including feudalism, continuing inequality and poor development in rural areas.

=== Literary Circle ===
He was an original partner in the Lima Literary Club and he participated in the foundation of the Peruvian Literary Circle, a vehicle to propose a literature based on science and the future. The Literary Circle saw themselves as freethinkers and that they were destined to change Peru, reaching out to González Prada, who immediately reoriented the groups direction. During his first address to the group at the Ateneo, he criticized those who looked to the past, stating "Our liberty will be useless if we limit ourselves in torm to the exaggerated purism of Madrid, or if in substance we submit ourselves to the Syllabus of Rome. Let us rid ourselves of the tendency that induces us to prefer the foliage of words to the fruit of ideas." In 1886, he became the head of the Literary Circle, stating:

I see myself, from this day on, at the head of a group destined to become the radical party of our literature.

During Fiestas Patrias on 28 July 1888, González Prada's Speech at the Politeama, read by an Ecuadorian orator due to the writer's stage fright, received thunderous applause by the audience, with President of Peru Andrés Avelino Cáceres, who was in attendance, saying "l did not know whether to arrest him or embrace him". The publication of the speech was unsuccessfully censored by the Cáceres government.

=== National Union ===
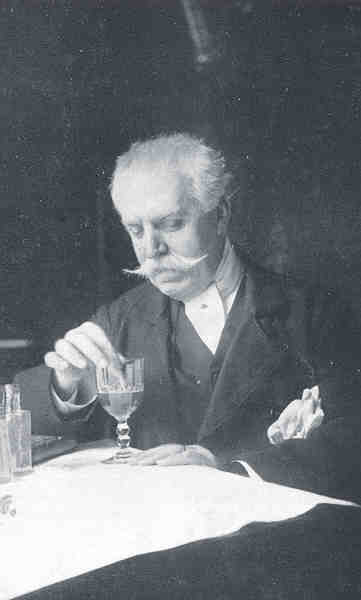
González Prada in 1915

In political life, González Prada was initially a member of the Civilista Party, but left to found with his friends, a radical party known as the National Union, a party of "propaganda and attack." The Literary Circle was transformed into National Union in 1891. González Prada was named as a presidential candidate, but had to flee to Europe following persecution. He spent seven years in Europe, visiting France and Spain, finally returning to Peru in May 1898. Upon his return, he called for social revolution and the "greatest liberty" be brought through social reform. In 1902, González Prada left National Union and instead chose to write for working-class newspapers. He began writing for Los Parias, a Peruvian anarchist newspaper, in 1904.

=== Later life ===
His books Minúsculas (1901) and Exóticas (1911) are often considered as modernista although his work transcends the scope of that movement. Some critics have suggested that his poetry is pre-proletarian. Baladas peruanas (1935), perhaps his best book, is a vindication of the Indian. His metrical and rhythmical innovations and experiments are remarkable in Spanish-American poetry. Horas de lucha (1908) is a good example of his prose.

Until his death, González Prada dedicated himself to educating university students and workers, holding Luz y Amor (Light and Love) discussion groups and sharing his writings with them. González Prada died of cardiac arrest on 22 July 1918 and was buried in the Cementerio Presbítero Matías Maestro as a Peruvian patriot. His writings on Anarchism, Anarquía, was posthumously released in 1936.

== Political views ==
Upon returning to Peru from Europe in 1898, Gonzalez Prada began to support anarchism, believing it provided more liberty compared to liberalism, which had prevented reform in Peru. He had similar anarchist thoughts as Pierre-Joseph Proudhon and Bakunin. An atheist, a follower of Darwin, Spencer, and Comte, Manuel González Prada was a powerful polemicist whose targets were the Catholic Church, the Spanish tradition, and, generally, any form of conservatism. He described anarchism as "a new Christianity ... without Christ" and that it provided "unlimited freedom and the greatest well-being for the individual with the abolition of the state and private property".

Gonzalez Prada did not see the crisis facing Peru as a class conflict, saying that one class achieving power over the other would only mimic actual social justice. When giving the "El intelectual y el obrero" address to the anarchist group Federación de Obreros Panaderos during an International Workers' Day event in 1905, he made the cautionary statement that "revolutions come from above, but are made operative from below ... every revolution once successful tends to become a government of force, every victorious revolutionary degenerates into a conservative". After seeing the failures of nationalism, his strong moral values and after embracing anarchism, Gonzalez Prada concluded:

"Given the general inclination of man to abuse power, all government is evil and all authority means tyranny."

== Legacy ==
The legacy of González Prada would not be recognized until later into the 20th century, influencing progressive movements within Peru. His writings also influenced indigenismo due to his criticism of the pervasive Spanish culture amongst the Peruvian elite. Linguistics scholar Bohdan Plaskacz described González Prada "as one of the greatest essayists of Latin America, champion of the rights of Peruvian Indians and spiritual father of the socialist movement of the following generation". Peruvian intellectuals influenced by González Prada include José Carlos Mariátegui and Víctor Raúl Haya de la Torre. Víctor Andrés Belaúnde was influenced by González Prada's description of a superficial elite class. His intellectual and stylistic footprint can be found in the writing of Clorinda Matto de Turner, Mercedes Cabello de Carbonera, José Santos Chocano, Aurora Cáceres, César Vallejo, José Carlos Mariátegui and Mario Vargas Llosa.

Following a curriculum change in the 1960s for the studies of the Peruvian Armed Forces, military students were taught the writings of González Prada and became disillusioned with the political elite, with officers ultimately overthrowing the government of Fernando Belaúnde in 1968 Peruvian coup d'état due to concerns of inequality. Thomas Ward, director of the Latin American and Latino Studies at Loyola University Maryland, said of González Prada:

"[E]ach century can boast of a voice that sounds in the desert shouting against colonialism, the corrupt, and its accomplices. ... A voice that, from the ruins of the War of the Pacific, ... rose up against pusillanimity, against the lack of principles, the Creole concept of Peru excluding the Andean, was that of Manuel González Prada."

== Works ==
=== Essays ===
- Discurso en el Politeama (1888)
- Pájinas libres (París, 1894)
- Nuestros indios (Lima, 1904), incorporado en la segunda edición de Horas de lucha.
- Horas de lucha (Lima, 1908)
- Bajo el oprobio (posthumous, París, 1933)
- Anarquía (posthumous, Santiago de Chile, 1936)
- Nuevas páginas libres (posthumous, París, 1936)
- Figuras y figurones (posthumous, París, 1938)
- Propaganda y ataque (posthumous, Buenos Aires: Ediciones Imán, 1939)
- Prosa menuda (posthumous, Buenos Aires, 1941)
- El tonel de Diógenes (posthumous, México, D.F.: Tezontle, 1945)

=== Poetry ===
- Al amor (Perú,1901)
- Minúsculas (Lima, 1901)
- Presbiterianas (Lima, 1909)
- Exóticas (Lima, 1911)
- Trozos de vida (posthumous, París, 1933)
- Baladas peruanas (posthumous, Santiago de Chile, 1935)
- Grafitos (posthumous, París, 1937)
- Libertarias (posthumous, París, 1938)
- Baladas (posthumous, París, 1939)
- Adoración (posthumous, Lima, 1946)
- Poemas desconocidos (posthumous, Lima, 1973)
- Letrillas (posthumous, Lima, 1975)
- Cantos del otro siglo (posthumous, Lima, UNMSM, 1979)

== Secondary bibliography ==
- Rufino Blanco Fombona, Grandes escritores de América, Madrid, 1917.
- Eugenio Chang-Rodríguez, La literatura política: De González Prada, Mariátegui y Haya de la Torre, Mexico, 1957, esp. pp. 51–125.
- John A. Crow, "The Epic of Latin America," Fourth Edition, pp. 636–639.
- Joël Delhom, "Ambiguités de la question raciale dans les essais de Manuel González Prada", en Les noirs et le discours identitaire latinoaméricain, Perpignan, 1997: 13–39.
- Efraín Kristal, Una visión urbana de los Andes: génesis y desarrollo del indigenismo en el Perú, 1848-1930, Lima, 1991.
- Robert G. Mead Jr., Perspectivas interamericanas: literatura y libertad, New York, 1967, esp. pp. 103–184.
- Eduardo Muratta Bunsen, "El pensamiento filosofico de don Manuel González Prada," en Filosofía y sociedad en el Perú, Lima, 2003: 128–143.
- Luis Alberto Sánchez, Nuestras vidas son los ríos…historia y leyenda de los González Prada, Lima, 1977.
- Isabelle Tauzin-Castellanos, ed., Manuel González Prada: escritor de dos mundos, Lima, 2006.
- Marcel Velázquez Castro, Las máscaras de la representación: el sujeto esclavista y las rutas del racismo en el Perú (1775-1895), Lima, 2005, esp. pp. 249–264.
- Thomas Ward, La anarquía inmanentista de Manuel González Prada. New York, 1998.
- Thomas Ward, “González Prada: soñador indigenista de la nación”, en su Resistencia cultural: La nación en el ensayo de las Américas, Lima, 2004: 160–177.
- Thomas Ward, “Manuel González Prada vs. Rigoberta Menchú: When Indigenismo meets Indigenous Thought.” Hispania 95.3 (September 2012): 400–423.
- Thomas Ward, ed, El porvenir nos debe una Victoria. La insólita modernidad de Manuel González Prada. Lima, 2010.
