= Speech at the Politeama =

The Speech at the Politeama was a speech written by Manuel González Prada and read by a student at the Teatro Politeama in Lima during a Fiestas Patrias event on 28 July 1888. The speech, given five years after the end of the invasion and occupation of Peru by Chile during the War of the Pacific, calls for the overthrow of the elite establishment in Peru.

== Background ==
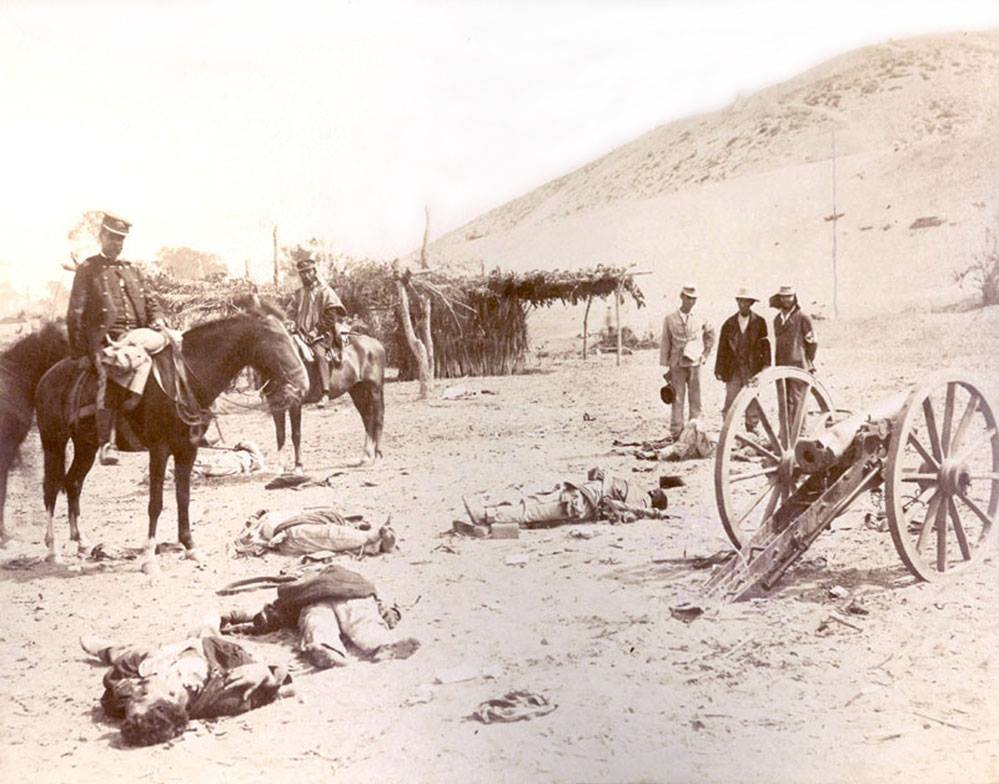
Chilean troops near a dead Peruvian gun crew following the Battle of Chorrillos during the War of the Pacific

The incompetence of the government and military was so great during the War of the Pacific period that it led to an intellectual movement dedicated to restoring pride for Peru, creating modern Peruvian nationalism. During Peru's impending defeat by Chile in the War of the Pacific, poet and academic Manuel González Prada would stay in his home for three years, refusing to look at the foreign invaders occupying Peru. The conflict proved to him that Peru was a failure under the economic oligarchy and that large reforms were necessary to improve the nation.

The Peruvian Literary Circle, whose members saw themselves as freethinkers and that they were destined to change Peru, reached out to González Prada, who immediately reoriented the groups direction. In 1886, González Prada became the head of the Literary Circle.

== Speech ==
The Peruvian Literary Circle, which was headed by González Prada, held a literary and musical event at the Teatro Politeama in Lima on 28 July 1888 during Fiestas Patrias, with the event being organized to raise funds for Peru to pay a ransom to Chile to regain the provinces of Arica and Tacna. González Prada who had a timid voice and suffered from stage fright, asked Ecuadorian orator Miguel Uribe to instead read the speech to those attending.

The speech, using imagery and sarcasm dissected the crises facing Peru before and after War of the Pacific, condemning the elite and Peruvian society for its own continuous defeat. González Prada would criticize the political elite for its limited economic interests, saying that the Catholic Church and military defended the elites. Calling on the younger generations of Peruvians, he called on them to abandon past traditions, bring positive change through science and to not cling to dogmas.

== Reception and legacy ==
The immediate response of the audience in Teatro Politeama was a frenzied applause. President of Peru Andrés Avelino Cáceres, who was present in the audience, would later state of González Prada, "l did not know whether to arrest him or embrace him". The Cáceres government would unsuccessfully attempt to censor the publication of the speech. The speech was also introduced González Prada's support for positivism.

Concerns raised by the speech would soon become central for indigenismo in Peru, with social justice movements calling for the integration of Indigenous peoples of Peru into society. The criticism of the Catholic Church also raised calls for secularism in Peru.
