= National Union (Peru) =

Former political party in Peru

National Union (Spanish: Unión Nacional) was a political party in Peru. It was originally called the Radical Party (Spanish: Partido Radical) by one of its founders Manuel González Prada, though the name seemed too confrontational to many in the party and thus it became known as the National Union. The party grew out of the Literary Circle and morphed into a political party in 1891. Support for the party was limited due to its basis on literature; many Peruvians were illiterate.

== Political views ==
The party's main structure supported federalism, indigenismo and opposition to the existing oligarchy comprising the military and Civil Party.

One of the central reasons it formed was to create a party of ideas, avoiding the cult of personality that guided the more traditional parties. The party also called for greater European immigration to Peru. Such a stance seems to be a paradox because many of its members defended Peru's Quechua speaking citizens. The only way to understand this paradox is to remember that the National Union was partly founded on the ideals of liberalism and that the Spanish language was the language of commerce.
