= Lola Larrosa de Ansaldo =

Uruguayan writer

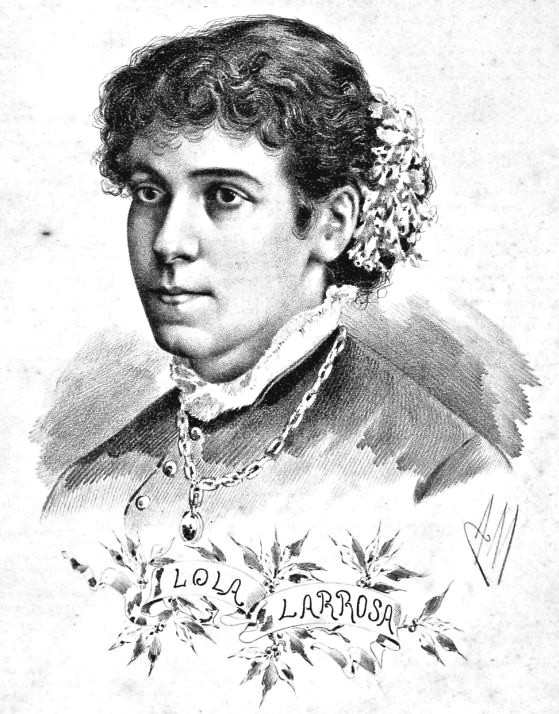
- Larrosa in 1884
- Born: Lola Larrosa; 1859; Uruguay
- Died: 1895; Argentina
- Occupation(s): Writer, Editor
- Spouse: Enrique Ansaldo

Lola Larrosa de Ansaldo (1859–1895) was a writer and editor born in Uruguay who lived most of her life in Argentina, where she died.

== Life ==
She was born Lola Larrosa in Nueva Palmira, Uruguay into an old patrician family that became impoverished for political reasons. After the family emigrated to Buenos Aires, Argentina, she began writing in earnest, a passion she had found at an early age. Larrosa wrote for several magazines including La ondina del Plata in 1876 and published her novels in Buenos Aires. Notably, she wrote for La alborada del Plata, which was run by the feminist Juana Manuela Gorriti. When Gorriti was out of the country during an armed conflict and unable to return to publish the paper, she asked Larrosa take over as editor.

She married the journalist Enrique Ansaldo and changed her name to Lola Larrosa de Ansaldo. The couple had a son but after her husband became incapacitated by mental illness, she took on the responsibility to support both son and husband.

Larrosa fell ill with tuberculosis and died in 1895, when she was 36 years old.

== Selected works ==
According to Vanesa Guerra, who wrote the prologue to Larrosa's The Luxury, the novel's background suggests similarities to the author's life.

"Rosalía is a young woman who likes to dress up as soon as the day begins, but her life takes place on a farm, among pigs and vegetables from a small Uruguayan village. The mother, attentive to sadness and mishaps, searches and discovers the cause: Rosalía has read books that have put dreams in her head. Then, first she burns the books and then, for the final bun, the house with a young worker. Now she has been burned, burned and crackled. In the first exchange, she agrees to leave with some wealthy friends of Buenos Aires to undertake a journey towards the dream of luxury. There she will live related to a way of beauty that does not seem well seen by either the narrator or the voices of loved ones."

== Selected works ==
- Sighs of the heart (1878)
- The works of Mercy. (Literary Essays) (1882)
- My daughter! (1888)
- The luxury. Novel of customs (1889)
- The Husbands, Novella (1893)
