= Josefina Pelliza de Sagasta =

Argentine writer

Josefina Pelliza Pueyrredon de Sagasta
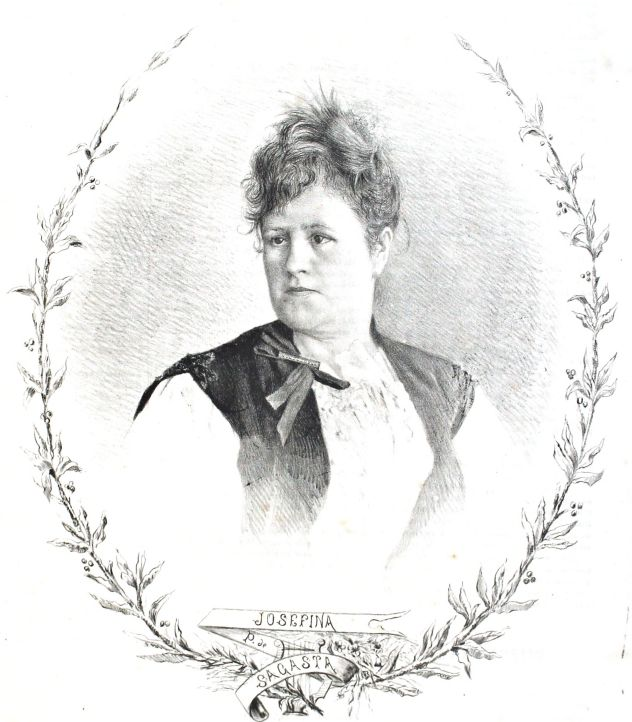
- Born: 4 April 1848; Concordia, Entre Ríos
- Died: 18 August 1888 (aged 40); Buenos Aires
- Occupations: Poet and journalist
- Known for: One of the first female Argentine poets

Josefina Pelliza Pueyrredon de Sagasta (born 4 April 1848, Concordia – d. 18 August 1888, Buenos Aires) was an Argentine poet, journalist, and writer. She was the daughter of Colonel Jose Maria Pelliza Gomez del Canto y D. Virginia de Pueyrredon (daughter of Juan Martin de Pueyrredon O'Doghan)

== Work ==
Pelliza was one of the first women poets in Argentina. Her best known poems are Pasionarias and Lirios silvestres, and her most popular novellas are Margarita, La Chiriguana, and El César. She worked as director of La Alborada del Plata magazine, which she used to demand social reform and make criticisms. She persistently advocated for women's rights, but maintained that women should be valued for their traditional roles in family and society. Pelliza believed that women were divine in nature because of their ability to create life and that involvement of women in the economy and higher education was immoral and unfit for women.
