= Alto Pativilca–Alto Marañón–Alto Huallaga Quechua =

Quechua dialect cluster of Peru

- kichwa
- Native to: Peru
- Region: Huánuco Province
- Native speakers: (100,000 cited 2000–2017, total): qvl: 7,000 (2000); qvm: 30,000 (2017); qxh: 29,000 (2017); qxa: 10,000 (2000); qub: 24,000 (2017)
- Language family: Quechua: Central (Quechua I); Alto Pativilca–Alto Marañón–Alto Huallaga Quechua

Language codes
- ISO 639-3: Variously: qvl – Cajatambo North Lima qvm – Margos-Yarowilca-Lauricocha qxh – Panao Huánuco qxa – Chiquián Ancash qub – Huallaga Huánuco
- Glottolog: apam1237 marg1254 Margos-Yarowilca-Lauricocha
- ELP: Alto Marañón Quechua; Alto Huallaga Quechua; Chiquian-Bolognesi and Cajatambo Quechua (Alto Pativilca Quechua)
- Linguasphere: 84-FAA-fba
- 84-FAA-fbb

Alto Pativilca–Alto Marañón–Alto Huallaga Quechua (abbreviated AP–AM–AH) is a dialect cluster of Quechua languages spoken in the Peruvian provinces of Huánuco, Lauricocha, Cajatambo and neighboring areas. The best-known dialect within the Huánuco cluster is Huallaga Quechua.

== Sources ==
- Adelaar, Willem. The Languages of the Andes. With the collaboration of P.C. Muysken. Cambridge language survey. Cambridge University Press, 2007, ISBN 978-0-521-36831-5
