= James Thomson (pastor) =

Scottish Baptist Pastor and educator

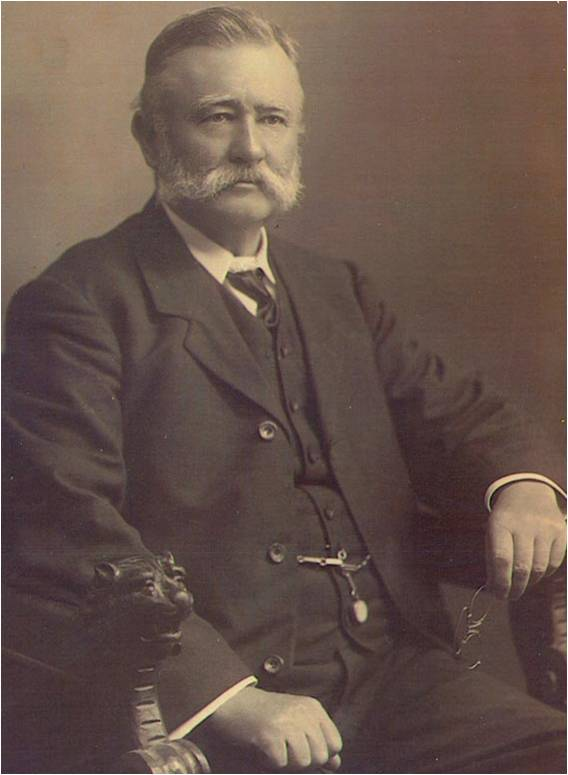

Director General de Escuelas of Buenos Aires
- In office 1819–1821

Personal details
- Born: September 1, 1788 Creetown, Kirkcudbrightshire, Scotland
- Died: February 25, 1854 (aged 65) London, England
- Occupation: Minister
- Profession: Teaching

James Diego Thomson (1788–1854) was a Scottish Baptist Pastor, and educator. He served as schoolmaster in South America where Thomson applied the Lancasterian system.

== Biography ==
Thomson was born 1788 in Creetown, Scotland, the son of William Thomson and Janet Burnett, belonging to a family that professed the Presbyterian religion. After completing his secondary studies, he enrolled in medicine and theology at Edinburgh and Glasgow Universities and later took a doctorate at McGill University in Canada. He learned the Spanish language, and served as a pastor in a village in Scotland.

In 1818, James Thomson arrived at the port of Buenos Aires. He had been commissioned by the British and Foreign Bible Society, to carry out the education system created by Joseph Lancaster. During his stay in Argentina, he was in charge of instructing the teachers of Buenos Aires. After the successful implementation of the Lancastrian system in the Río de la Plata, Thomson was appointed director of schools in Buenos Aires, a position he had held until 1821.

In 1821, Thomson was hired by the government of Chile. And in 1822, was invited by the General José de San Martín to visit the city of Lima, in order to introduce a modern education system.

James Diego Thomson was appointed an honorary citizen of the United Provinces of the River Plate, for his great contribution to national public education.
