= Ricardo Jaimes Freyre =

Bolivian poet (1868–1933)

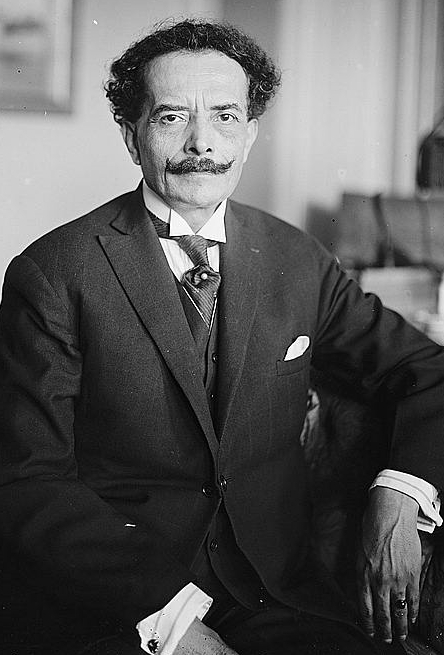
Ricardo Jaimes Freyre in 1923

Ricardo Jaimes Freyre (May 12, 1868 – April 24, 1933) was a Peruvian-born Bolivian poet, prose writer, and diplomat.

== Background and early years ==
Born in Tacna, Peru on May 12, 1868, his Symbolist-influenced verse, which frequently made use of free verse forms, was important in the development of Latin American Modernismo.

Freyre spent much of his time abroad, especially in Tucumán, Argentina, teaching literature at the Padres Lourdistas' Secondary School.

== Collaboration with Rubén Darío ==
He founded, in collaboration with Rubén Darío the "short-lived but influential" review Revista de América.

His works were also influenced by Norse mythology.

== Death ==
Freyre died in Banfield, Argentina on April 24, 1933.

== Notes ==
Political offices
Preceded by Alberto Gutiérrez	Foreign Minister of Bolivia; 1922	Succeeded by Abdón Saavedra
