= Teresa González de Fanning =

Peruvian writer and journalist

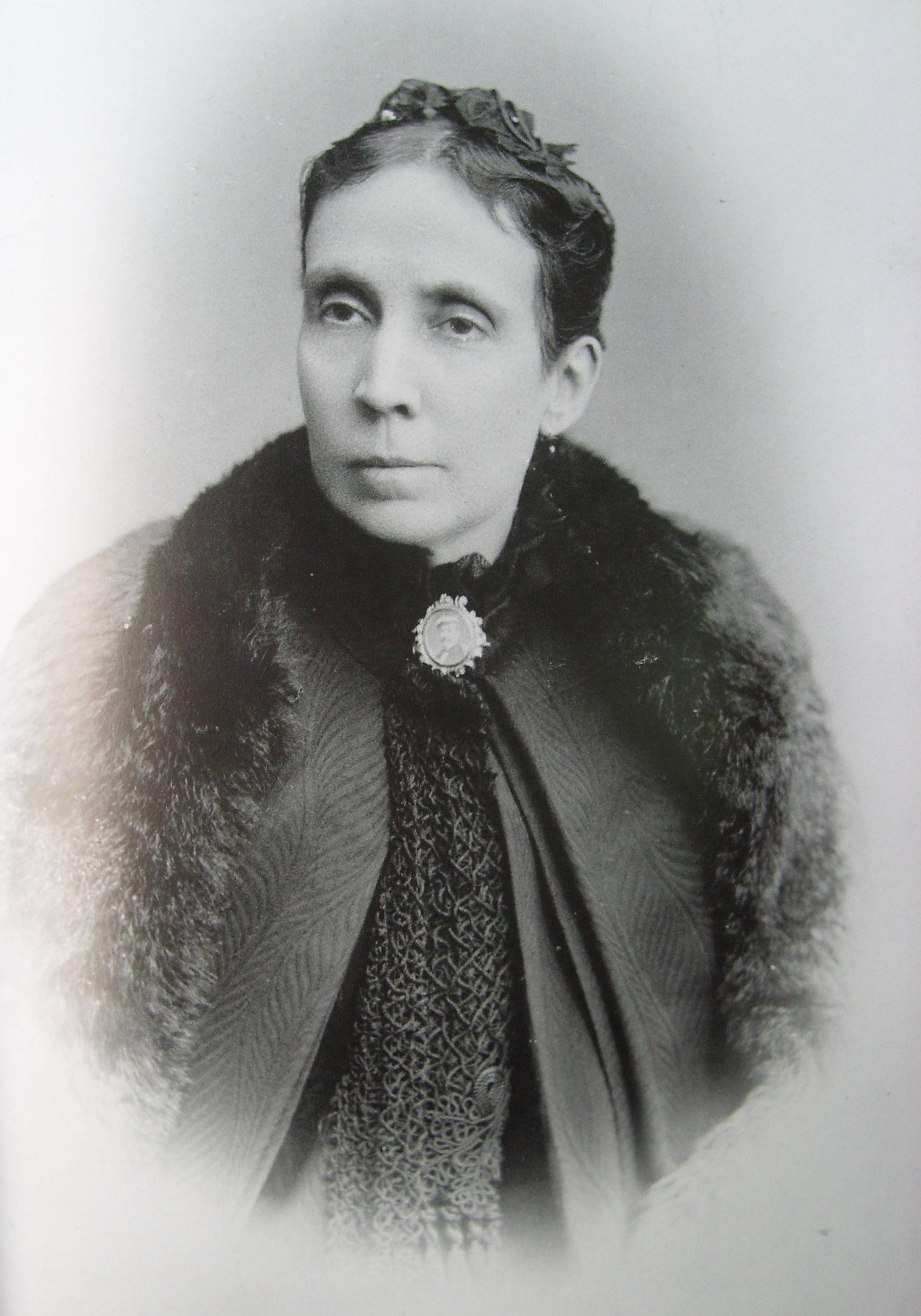
- Born: 12 August 1836; Nepeña District
- Died: 7 April 1918 (aged 81); Miraflores District, Lima
- Writing career
- Language: Spanish
- Genres: Journalist, Educator

Teresa González de Fanning (Nepeña District, Ancash Region, Peru, 12 August 1836 - Miraflores District, Lima, 7 April 1918) was a Peruvian writer and journalist notable for her activism in the education of women. She founded the Liceo Fanning (1881), a women's college, where she implemented her educational approaches. Although a somewhat forgotten figure, she is deemed as the precursor to the integral education of women, with practical connotations (including labor formation) as a form of attaining liberation from the patriarchy. This is notable because, at the time, Peruvian society still considered that female education should only be aimed at improving their role as housewives. She was the widow of Juan Fanning, a Peruvian war hero who perished during the Battle of Miraflores in the War of the Pacific.

== Career ==
A collection of her articles, which were published in El Comercio, were compiled in a booklet entitled Female Education (1898). It was highly critical about women's education, which till then, was exclusively geared to prepare for marriage and motherhood. Gonzalez rejected this type of curriculum, promoting in its place the study of music, writing and mathematics as broader preparation with a practical connotation. She favored job training which would provide a source of income, allowing women to emancipate themselves from dependence on a husband. At lower levels, she suggested a more practical life skills education to learn a trade. On another level, she described a more enlightened education, within scientific and philosophical disciplines. Her views were recognized as a precursor to modern educational programs for women.

== Selected works ==
- Ambición y abnegación (1886)
- Regina (1886)
- Indómita (1904)
- Roque Moreno (1904)
- Lucecitas (1893)
