= Numa Pompilio Llona =

Ecuadorian poet, journalist, educator, diplomat and philosopher

Numa Pompilio Llona Echeverri
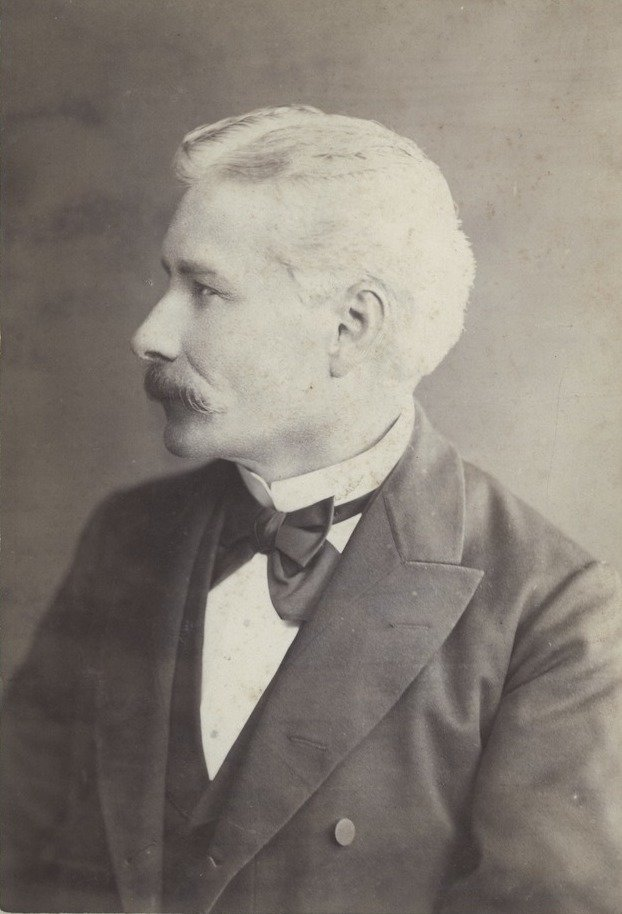
- Born: March 5, 1832; Guayaquil, Ecuador
- Died: October 10, 1907 (aged 75); Guayaquil, Ecuador
- Occupations: Poet, Diplomat
- Spouse(s): Enriqueta Marchena y Bentín, Lastenia Larriva
- Writing career
- Movement: Romanticism

Numa Pompilio Llona Echeverri (March 5, 1832 – April 5, 1907) was an Ecuadorian poet, journalist, educator, diplomat, and philosopher.

Numa Pompilio Llona was widely read in his time, but today he is mostly forgotten.

== Biography ==
His father was the Ecuadorian lawyer Dr. Manuel Leocadio de Llona y Rivera, and his mother was Mercedes Echeverri Llados from Colombia. Born in Guayaquil, Numa Pompilio Llona completed primary school in Cali, Colombia, and completed secondary school in Lima, Peru. He received a law degree at the Universidad San Marco in Lima, Peru.

== Career ==
From 1854 to 1859, Numa Pompilo Llona was the literary editor of the Peruvian newspaper El Comercio. In 1882 he was appointed the rector of the University of Guayaquil, where he held the professorship of aesthetics and general literature. He also served as a diplomat in Spain (1860–62), France, Italy (1864), and Colombia (1884), and formed friendships with many famous poets and writers of the time, such as Victor Hugo, George Sand, Alphonse de Lamartine, Cienfuegos Manzini, Núñez de Arce, Leopard and others. He was also the director of the Municipal Museum and Library of Guayaquil (1904 to 1907).

== Marriage ==
Numa Pompilio Llona was married to Enriqueta Marchena y Bentín, and after her death, married the Peruvian poet and journalist Lastenia Larriva.

== Death ==
Numa Pompilio Llona died on April 5, 1907. His remains are interred in crypt # 705-C in the Cementerio General of Guayaquil.

== Legacy ==
One of Guayaquil’s most popular tourist attractions, the neighborhood Las Peñas has a street named after Numa Pompilio Llona. Many of this street’s 400-year-old houses have been converted into art galleries and several notable artists have studios there. There are also schools in Ecuador named after Numa Pompilio Llona.

== Literary works ==
- Cien sonetos (1847)
- Cien sonetos nuevos (1880)
- Interrogaciones
- Amor supremo
- Himnos, dianas y elegías patrióticas y religiosas
- De la penumbra a la Luz
- Cantos americanos (1866)
- Nuevas poesías
- Artículos en rosa
- Noches de dolor en las montañas (1872)
- Cantos patrióticos y religiosos (1881)
- Canto a la vida
- La odisea del alma (1876)
- Clamores de Occidente
- Poemas amatorios y diversos (1882)
- El gran enigma
- Noche de dolor en las montañas
- Grandeza moral
- La bandera del ecuador
- La estela de una vida (1893)
- Los caballeros del Apocalipsis (1869)
