= Mercedes Cabello de Carbonera =

Peruvian writer (1845–1909)

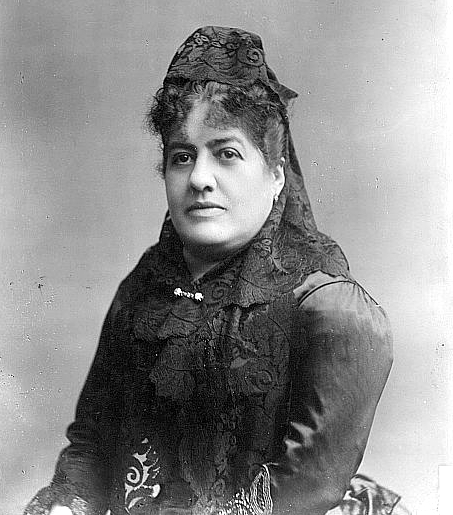
Mercedes Cabello de Carbonera

Mercedes Cabello Llosa de Carbonera (Moquegua, February 7, 1845 – Lima, October 12, 1909) was a Peruvian writer. Influenced by positivism and naturalism, she was one of the main initiators of literary realism in Peruvian novels. She wrote six novels of social content and critical importance, the most successful being Blanca Sol (1888), Las consecuencias (1890) and El conspirador (1892). She also wrote numerous articles and essays published in Peruvian newspapers on literary and social topics. She especially advocated the emancipation of women, and was one of the first Peruvian feminists. She was a contemporary of Manuel González Prada, who, like Cabello, was a sui generis positivist; and an attendee of Juana Manuela Gorriti's tertulias, which provided her an opportunity to meet other female writers and discuss literature and feminist ideologies. Her literary works Sacrificio y recompensa, Blanca Sol, Las consequencias and El conspirador contain a recurrent theme of women portrayed as "helpless, suffering creatures or as fallen heroines." This is another one of the most prominent themes in her writings. Another common topic is her criticism of the Peruvian bourgeoisie, Lima's social elites, between 1860 and 1880.

== Associations ==
Cabello de Carbonera is usually associated with female Peruvian writers like Carolina Freine de Jaimes and Juana Manuela Gorriti.

Cabello's pseudonym was Enriqueta Pradel, which she used to publish her work in the periodicals El Album and El Recreo.

== Early years ==
Mercedes Cabello de Carbonera was born in Moquegua to a wealthy family that provided her with an education. The Department of Moquegua, where she lived during her childhood, was one of the areas affected by the presence of Chilean troops, which would later be a feature of her novel El Conspirador. During her developmental years Ramón Castilla was the president of Perú and his liberal politics led to the expansion of the subjects women could be taught in school, including French, English, geography and arithmetic. She thus learned French in her early years, which later allowed her to read contemporary European writers fluently, without having to depend on translations. But Cabello de Carbonera's own educational development was not due to regular schooling. Due to the lack of available education for women, her parents hired private tutors to keep her properly educated in subjects approved for young ladies of the bourgeoisie; but she mostly taught herself and was very fond of reading. This provided the author with insight into literary works that her fellow Peruvians were not reading. European literary movements such as Romanticism and Naturalism had a great influence over her work. These literary movements are especially important because in literary works of the 19th century like those of Cabello de Carbonera it was highly appreciated when an author could include romantic and naturalistic elements in their work.

== Later years ==
At the age of twenty two, Cabello de Carbonera moved to Lima where she would marry a doctor and develop her career as a writer. Cabello de Carbonera was widowed at a very young age, which had the effects that she had enough liberty to escape from any patriarchal control and that she did not have any children. She knew that she was in a position many women in her community would never understand, so she wrote in order to get women to fight against patriarchal oppression. And despite her marital status, Cabello de Carbonera became an active member of the literary scene. She was published and read during her lifetime, becoming one of the first best-selling Peruvian writers. Her work was highly controversial in the 19th century due to its critical attitudes towards the Peruvian aristocracy.

== Religious Beliefs ==
With regard to religion, Cabello de Carbonera was not against Catholicism, but she did criticize when women from the bourgeoisie used religious holidays to flaunt their high fashion. Her criticism concerned how religion was manipulated by high class society, rather than religion itself. She also didn't believe that religion should have a predominant role in women's education as was typical during that time.

In the literary works of Mercedes Cabello de Carbonera she emphasizes a personal and professional engagement with the problems of the social norms during her lifetime and her goal to present the problems of everyday bourgeos life was clearly present in the controversies caused by many of her novels. One of the problems she wanted to address was the lack of importance given to women's education. Therefore, Cabello de Carbonera used “the language of positivism to court the liberals who were flexible regarding fixing higher standards for women’s education.” We can see a small glimpse of the limited education Peruvian women were exposed to in Cabello de Carbonera's novel Blanca Sol where the protagonist has an inadequate education and no strong female role models to guide them away from antiquated social norms. Each one of Mercedes Cabello de Carbonera's novels all cultivate an analogy of Perú's history.

== Partial list of works ==
=== Novels ===
- Sacrificio y recompensa (Lima, 1886), premiada por el Ateneo de Lima.
- Eleodora (Madrid, 1887), later rewritten as Las consecuencias.
- Los amores de Hortensia (1886 and 1887)
- Blanca Sol (novela social) (1888, 1889 and 1894)
- Las consecuencias (1890)
- El conspirador (autobiografía de un hombre público) (1892 and 1898)

=== Essays ===
- Influencia de las Bellas Letras en el progreso moral y material de los pueblos (1887), awarded a gold medal by the Municipalidad de Lima.
- La novela realista
- Importancia de la literatura
- Estudio comparativo de la inteligencia y la belleza de la mujer
- Perfeccionamiento de la educación y la condición social de la mujer
- La novela moderna (1892), awarded the Rosa de Oro in the Concurso Interamericano de Ensayo promoted by the Academia Literaria de Buenos Aires.
- La religión de la humanidad (1893)
- El conde León Tolstoi (1896)
