= Clorinda Matto de Turner =

Peruvian writer (1852–1909)

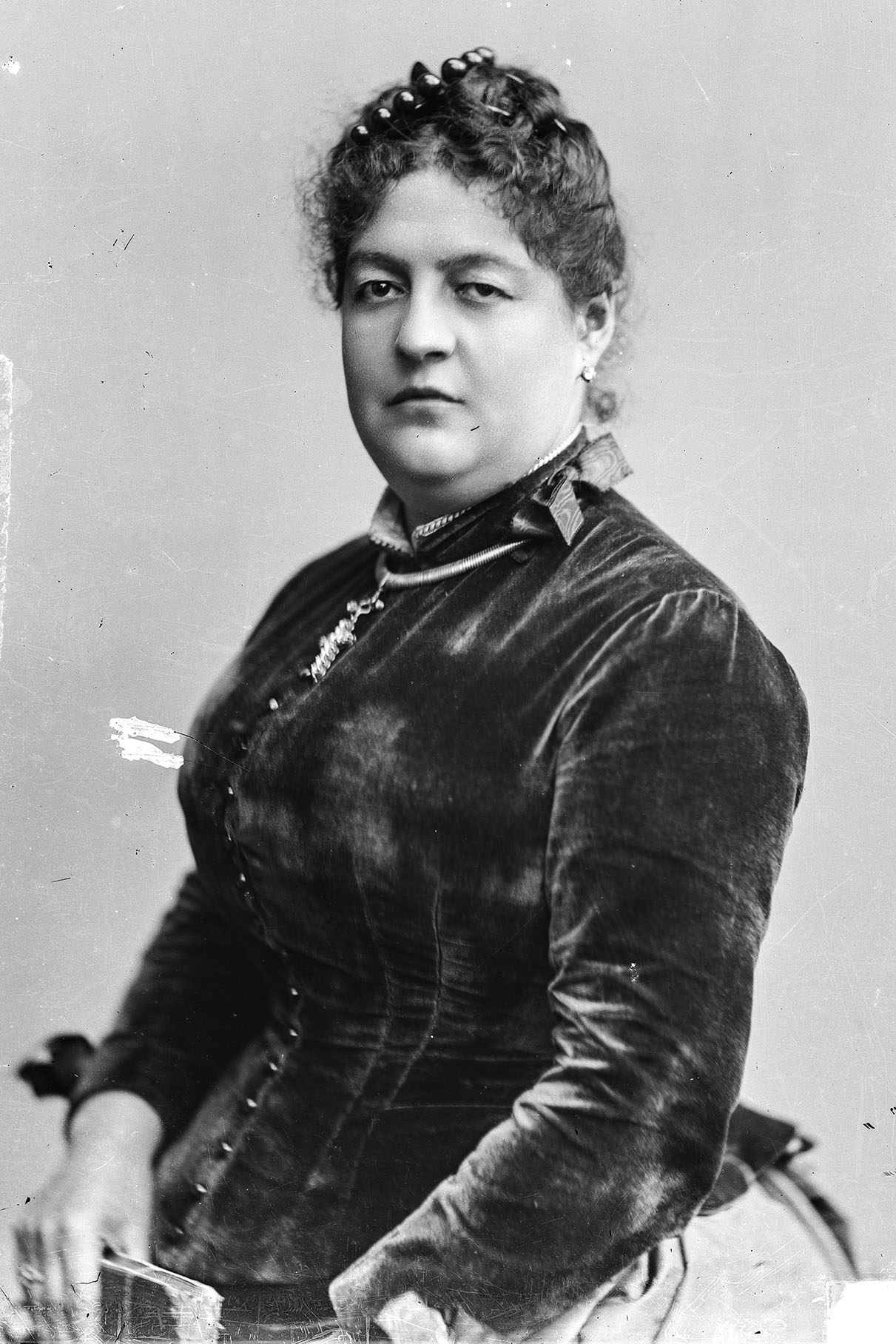
- Photo on glass plate taken at the photographic studio of Eugenio Courret, circa 1887
- Born: November 11, 1852; Coya, Cusco Peru
- Died: October 25, 1909 (aged 56); Buenos Aires, Argentina
- Resting place: Cementerio General de La Almudena
- Occupations: Writer; Thinker; Politician
- Spouse: Joseph Turner (1871-1881)
- Parent(s): Grimanesa Concepción Usandivaras Gárate and Ramón Matto Torres
- Relatives: David Matto (brother) Samuel Usandivaras (uncle)
- Writing career
- Language: Modern Spanish
- Genres: Novel; Essay
- Notable work: Aves sin nido

Clorinda Matto de Turner (11 November 1852 in Cusco – 25 October 1909) was a Peruvian writer who lived during the early years of Latin American independence. Her own independence inspired women throughout the region as her writings sparked controversy in her own culture. She was forced into exile in Argentina.

== Early life and education ==
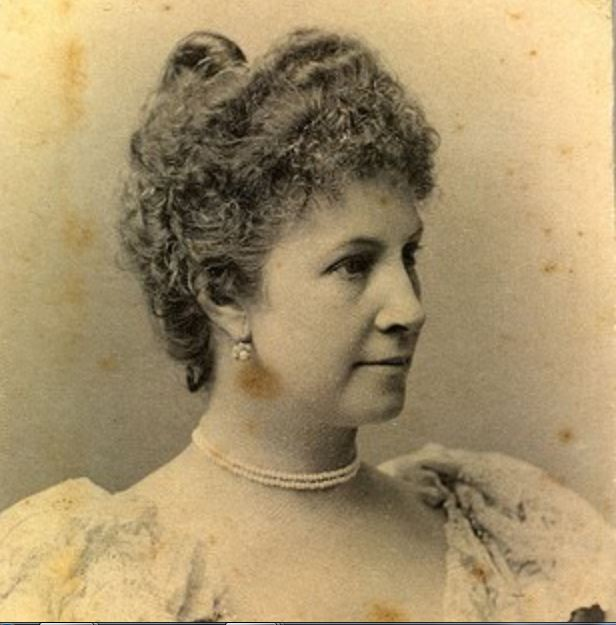
Matto de Turner, c.1890

She was born and raised in Cusco, Peru. Matto de Turner's father was Ramón Mato Torres and her mother was Grimanesa Concepción Usandivares. When her mother died, she became known as Azucena de los Andes ("Lily of the Andes") throughout the region. Matto de Turner was baptized Grimanesa Martina Mato, but was called Clorinda among her friends and family. She originally had one "T" in her last name, but after studying the Inca culture she added the extra "T" to give the name an Inca flavor.

Growing up in Cusco, the former Inca capital, Matto spent most of her days on her family's estate, Paullo Chico, which is near the village of Coya. As a teenager, Matto attended the school that is now known as the Escuela Nacional de Educandas (National Women's Secondary School). There she took some very unconventional courses that were viewed as unfeminine in the culture. She majored in independent studies, which included Philosophy, Natural History, and Physics. Matto left school at the age of sixteen to spend more time taking care of her brother and father.

== Career ==
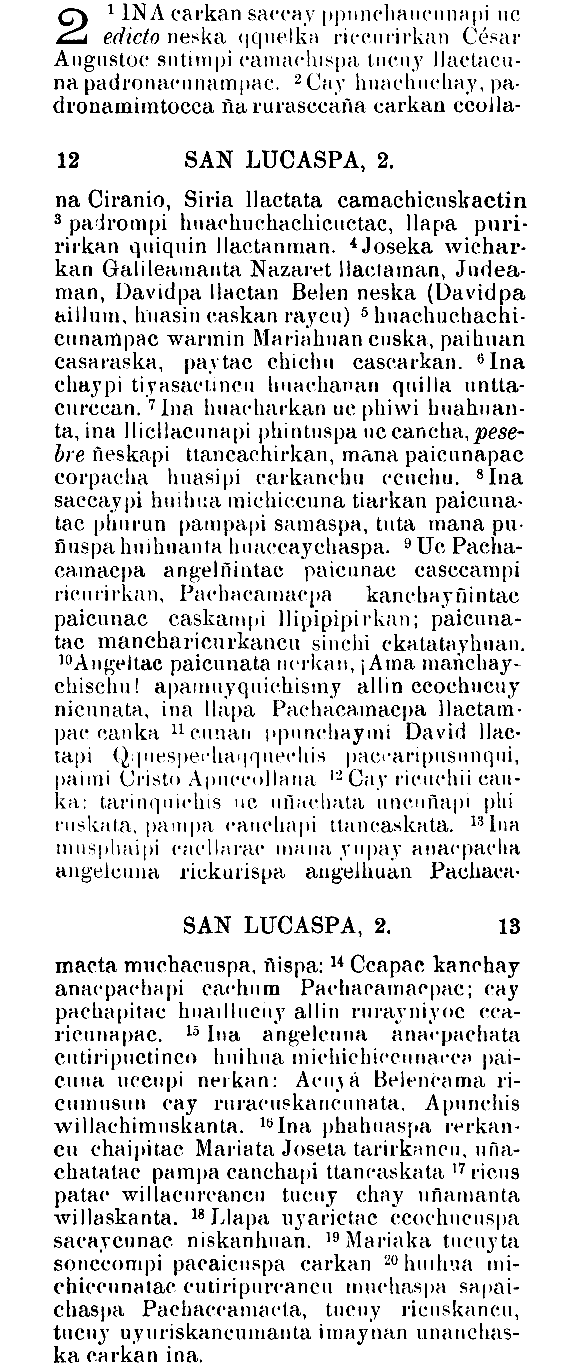
Nativity of Jesus (Luke 2:1–20), translation by Clorinda Matto into Cusco Quechua, 1901

In 1871, at the age of 19, Matto married an Englishman, Dr. Turner, a wealthy landowner. Shortly after their marriage they moved to Tinta, where they lived for 10 years. In Tinta, Matto de Turner became more aware of Peru's two histories: the colonial and the Inca. She became very familiar with indigenous culture, and the more she learned, the more she embraced it. Much of her writing is inspired by what she learned from her acquaintance with this culture. She found work as a journalist, with local and foreign papers. In 1878, Matto de Turner founded El Recreo de Casco, a magazine offering literature, science, art and education. She became known for literary works that portrayed indigenous people in a positive light, in contrast to the mainstream views of her society. Even though she was of white ancestry, she did not agree with the oppressive treatment of Peru's indigenous peoples, and she used her writings to speak out on their behalf. Matto de Turner also used her writings to campaign for better education for women.

In 1881, her husband died, leaving the estate bankrupt. Unable to improve her financial situation in Tinta, Matto de Turner moved to Arequipa where she worked as editor in chief at the newspaper La Bolsa Americana. While there she published two volumes of "Tradiciones cuzqueñas," one in 1884 and another in 1886. She also wrote the drama Himacc-Suacc (1884) and translated the four Gospels, the Acts of the Apostles and the Epistle to the Romans into the Quechua language spoken by the indigenous people in the Cusco Region of Peru. Besides her literary works she also got involved in politics, and raised money for the development of the battleship Almirante Grau.

Matto de Turner eventually moved from Tinta to live in Lima, although with her political and controversial writings she often thought it would be safer to live outside of Peru. In Lima she joined many different literary organizations and publications.

In 1887, Matto de Turner became director of El Peru Ilustrado, where she published many of her novels. She published three novels between 1889 and 1895: Aves Sin Nido (Birds Without a Nest), Indole (Character), and Herencia (Heredity). These novels talk about the indigenous people getting stripped of all their civil rights as well as getting persecuted by the community and the self-indulgent priests. Matto de Turner's most famous novel was Aves Sin Nido (translated as "Torn from the Nest")(1889). This novel was controversial because it was about a love affair between a white man and an indigenous woman, which was considered a disgrace among Latin American society during this time, and because it spoke of the immorality of the priests during that period. The reason the characters in the novel couldn't marry was because they eventually learned that they were both fathered by the same philandering priest. Aves Sin Nido was not Matto de Turner's only controversial work. She also published a controversial story written by a Brazilian writer by the name of Henrique Coelho Neto in her newspaper, El Perú Illustrado. Her controversial writings led to her excommunication by the Archbishop.

In 1895, she moved to Buenos Aires, Argentina, where she continued her literary activities. In 1900, she wrote Boreales, Miniaturas y Porcelanas (Northerners, Miniatures, and Porcelain) a collection of essays which includes "Narraciones históricas," an important historiographical contribution that shows her deep sorrow at being exiled from Peru and her longing to return. In Buenos Aires Matto de Turner founded Búcaro Americano; she also gave numerous public lectures and wrote many articles for the press. Matto de Turner spent most of her time teaching at a local university as a professor. In 1908, when she visited Europe for the first time in her life, she made sure to carefully document this in the book Viaje de Recreo (Trip of Amusement). The book was released in newspapers upon her death in 1909.

== Legacy ==
In 2010, a mausoleum was constructed in a Cusco cemetery for her remains.

In 2022, a park in Peru was named in her honor.

The National Library of Peru declared her works as part of the cultural patrimony of Peru, honored her with a revised edition of her works, and later on their website on the 172nd anniversary of her birth in 2024.

== First editions of her works ==
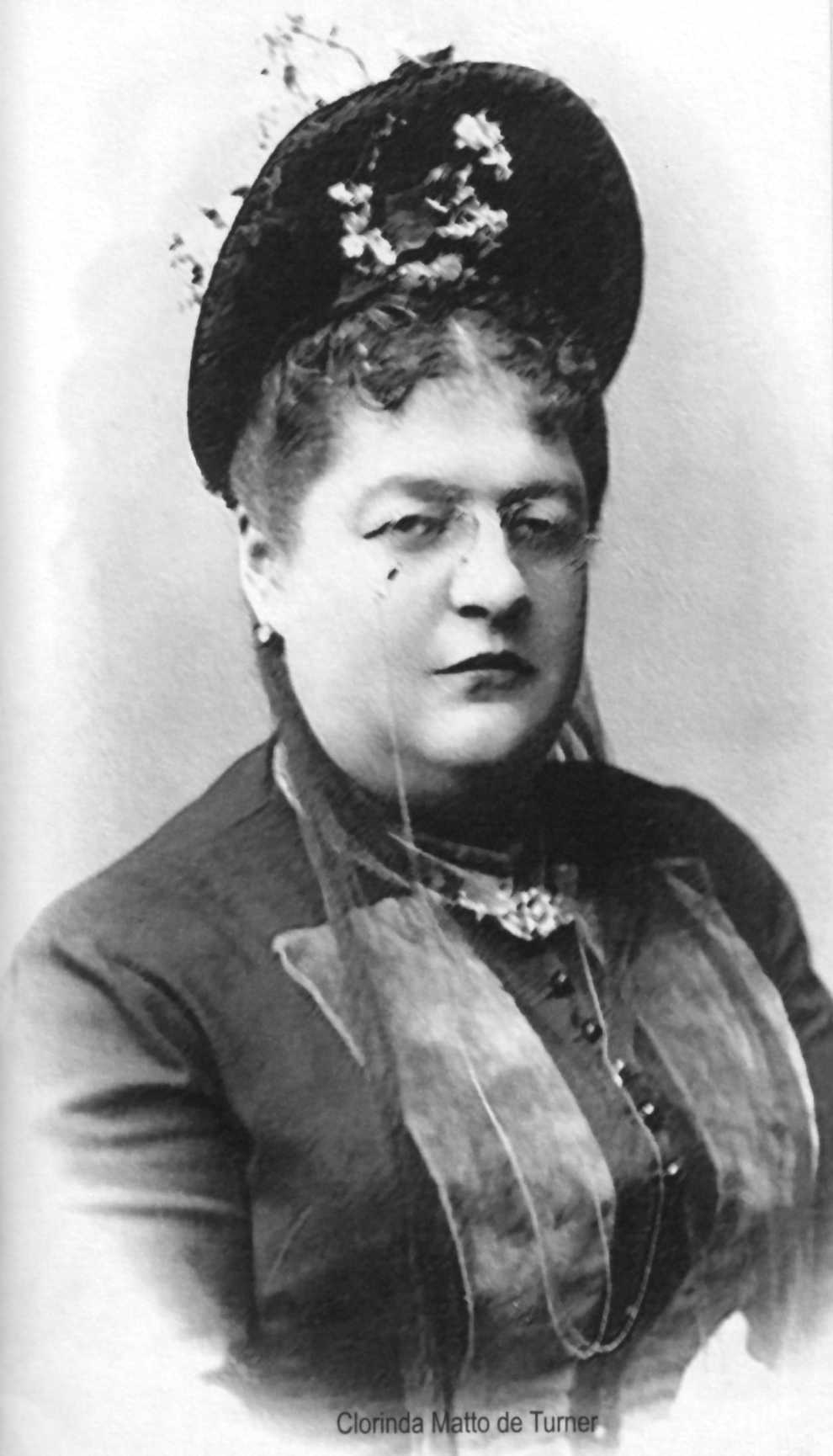
Clorinda Matto de Turner

=== Tradiciones y leyendas ===
- Perú: Tradiciones cuzqueñas. Arequipa: "La Bolsa", 1884.
- Tradiciones cuzqueñas. 2 vols. Lima: Torres Aguirre, 1886.
- Leyendas y recortes. Lima: "La Equitativa", 1893.

=== Fiction ===
- Aves sin nido. Lima: Imprenta del Universo de Carlos Prince, 1889. A first translation of the novel was published in London in 1904.
- Índole. Lima: Imprenta Bacigalupi, 1891.
- Herencia. Lima: Imprenta Bacigalupi, 1893.

=== Biography, epistolary prose, travel writing, and essays ===
- Bocetos al lápiz de americanos célebres. Lima: Peter Bacigalupi, 1889.
- Boreales, miniaturas y porcelanas. Buenos Aires: Juan A. Alsina, 1902.
- Cuatro conferencias sobre América del Sur. Buenos Aires: Juan A. Alsina, 1909.
- Viaje de recreo: España, Francia, Inglaterra, Italia, Suiza, Alemana. Valencia: F. Sempere, 1909.

=== Theatre ===
- Hima-Sumac: Drama en tres actos y en prosa. Lima: "La Equitativa", 1893. This was staged in 2022 for the first time in decades.

== See also ==
- Noli Ne Tángere, by Jose Rizal, a Filipino novel that explores many of the same themes and plot elements as her novels
- Peruvian literature
- List of Peruvian writers
