= Academia Antártica =

Society of writers, poets, and intellectuals in Lima, Peru

The Academia Antártica ("Antarctic Academy") was a society of writers, poets and intellectuals—mostly of the criollo caste—that assembled in Lima, Peru, in the 16th and 17th centuries. Their objective was to author a body of literature that matched or surpassed that of Europe's and would prove that literariness indeed thrived in Spain's remotest colonies. Members of this collective together published several anthologies of original writings and translations, the most famous of which are the Primera parte del Parnaso Antártico de obras amatorias (Antarctic Parnassus, Part One: Poems of Romance) and the Segunda parte del Parnaso Antártico de divinos poemas (Antarctic Parnassus, Part Two: Poems of the Divine). (Note: Neither volume of the Parnaso Antártico has been published in English. These titles have been translated by Dustin Hixenbaugh, a Ph.D. student at the University of Texas at Austin, solely to achieve clarity in this article.) These are dated 1608 and 1617, respectively.

== Inspiration and influence ==
In the late 16th century, Lima, Peru, was a vibrant cultural center characterized by a widespread appreciation for literature. Even in "mills, mines and haciendas", not to mention in the homes of the aristocracy, classical Greek and Roman texts were circulated heavily. These included the writings of Aristotle, Herodotus, Petrarch, Cicero and Ovid. Indeed, one of the Academia's most distinguishing features is its members' imitations of—and relentless allusions to—classical canonical texts.

The literary community in Lima was keenly attentive to cultural trends in Europe. It is likely that certain Limeño writers felt compelled to form the Academia Antártica in the last decades of the 16th century because similar societies had sprung up in Seville around that same time. Because no records documenting the society's gatherings or membership roster remain, little else is known for certain about the Academia. Most of the information we have about its mission and affiliates comes from only three sources: (1) a sonnet composed by Gaspar de Villaroel that appears in the Arauco domado (1596) and is dedicated to the society; (2) the lyric poem "Discurso en loor de la poesía", which is attributed to the enigmatic Clarinda and praises many of the Academia's members; and (3) a sonnet named "Academia" that was written by Pedro de Oña.

Scholars debate the organization and membership of the Academia Antártica—at least one critic has even suggested that it was actually just a branch of the University of San Marcos; however, there is little disagreement about the society's mission to spread the word that in Lima world-caliber literary geniuses thrived. Under the scrutiny of recent post-colonial theorists, the society's name has been interpreted as a deliberately hybrid intended to unite literary customs ("Academia") and spaces where they existed without recognition ("Antártica"). The original poetry associated with the Academia, in particular Clarinda's "Discurso en loor de la poesía" ("Discourse in Praise of Poetry"), seems to confirm that its members resented Europe's reluctance to acknowledge as talented the poets who lived and wrote in the American colonies.

To modern readers, the Academia's writing may seem more European in style and theme than American. This may be due to the collective's emphasis on the translation and imitation of classical works, the adherence to then-popular Petrarchan tropes, and the general absence of references to indigenous peoples and folklore. Nevertheless, the Academia represents an important step toward the achievement of a Peruvian national literature and its recognition by European intellectuals. This recognition may have come from Spain's most influential author himself, Miguel de Cervantes, who in his Canto a Calíope (1583) celebrates the literature generated in Spain's American colonies, though he does not mention the Academia Antártica by name.

== Publications ==
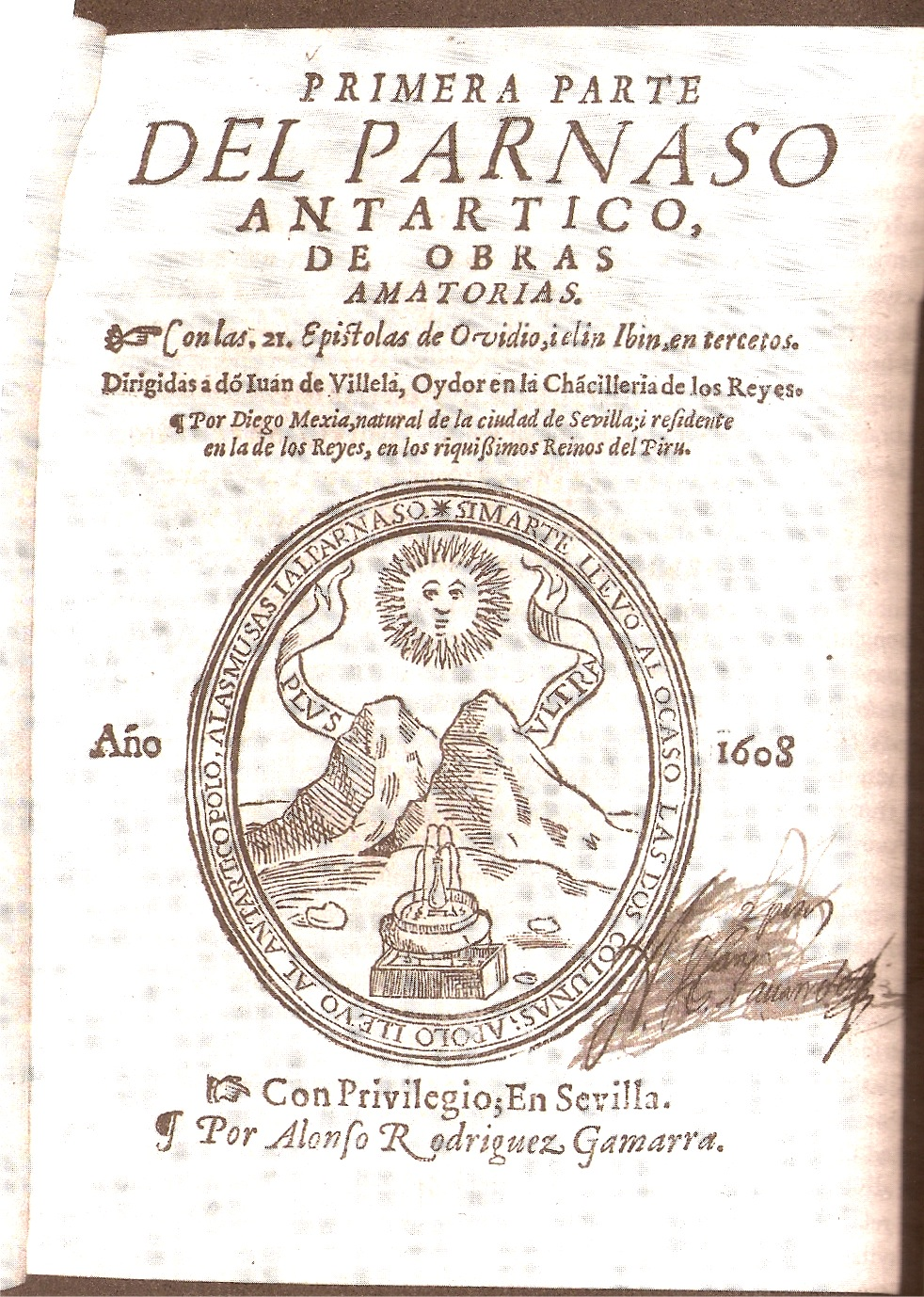
Title Page from Primera parte del Parnaso Antártico de obras amatorias, which includes Clarinda's "Discourse in Praise of Poetry". Published in 1608 in Seville, Spain.

=== The Antarctic Parnassus (1608 & c.1617) ===
The most influential of the Academia Antártica's works, the Primer parte del Parnaso Antártico de obras amotorias (Antarctic Parnassus, Part One: Poems of Romance) was printed in Seville in 1603. Its centerpiece is the new Spanish-language translation of Ovid's Heroides, penned by Diego Mexía de Fernangil, a Spaniard who traveled extensively in Mexico and Peru and was a fundamental member of the Academia. The volume also contains Mexía's "El autor a sus amigos" ("From the Author to His Friends"), a narrative of his travels through the Spanish Empire.

The publication's cover features an emblem and motto that more or less summarize the Academia's objective (see the facsimile to the right). The motto reads: "Si Marte llevó a ocaso las dos colunas; Apolo llevó a Antártico las Musas y al Parnaso" ("If Mars bore the two columns [marking the boundary of known world] off to the West, Apollo carried off the Muses to Parnassus and the Antarctic."). The Antarctic was, in the time of Spanish colonization, a nickname for Peru—the place Mexía says the gods now favor with poetry.

Preceding Mexía's translation is a collection of lyric poems written by fellow members of the Academia Antártica and in praise of the author's work. The most notable of these is Clarinda's "Discurso en loor de la poesía" ("Discourse in Praise of Poetry"), which also invokes figures from Greek and Roman mythology to lionize the literary genius of colonial Peruvian writers. Due in part to 20th-century feminist and post-colonial analyses, Clarinda's "Discurso" has surpassed Mexía's translation in respect and canonization and has become the Academia's "most celebrated" product.

Mexía followed the first part of the Antarctic Parnassus series with two subsequent collections. The immediate follow-up, Segunda parte del Parnaso Antártico de divinos poemas (Antarctic Parnassus, Part Two: Poems of the Divine) has thus far received less critical scrutiny than its predecessor. The final volume, the third part of the Antarctic Parnassus, has been lost.

=== Other publications ===
The two afore-mentioned publications, and the lost third volume, are the publications most often associated with the Academia Antártica as a collective. However, many of the society's members published other works independently and collectively that also reflect the Academia's influences. These include Carlos de Balboa's Miscelánea Antártica (1586) and Diego Dávalos de Figueroa's Miscelánea Austral (1602).

== List of members ==
This list is adopted from the one presented in Sonia Rose's essay, and the categorization is hers; however, the Spanish-language Wikipedia article includes additional names that could not be verified.

Authors with complete poems intact:

- Diego de Aguilar y Córdoba
- Miguel Cabello de Balboa
- Clarinda ("The Unknown Poetess") (Note: Two important pieces of Peruvian lyric poetry, "Epístola a Belardo" and "Discurso en loor de la poesía", were composed while the Academia Antártica was active, and both are attributed to anonymous women known only by their pen names: Amarilis and Clarinda, respectively. See Sabat de Rivers for more about the challenges confronted by women who were interested in writing in the Spanish colonies.)
- Diego Dávalos y Figueroa
- Diego de Hojeda
- Diego Mexía de Fernangil
- Enrique Garcés
- Juan de Miramontes y Zuázola
- Pedro de Oña

Authors with poem fragments intact:

- Cristóbol de Arriaga
- Francisco de Figueroa
- Pedro de Montes de Oca
- Luis Pérez Ángel
- Cristóbol Pérez Rincón
- Juan de Portilla y Agüero
- Juan de Salcedo Villandrando
- Gaspar de Villarroel y Coruña

Authors known only by reference:

- Pedro de Carvajal
- Antonio Falcón
- Duarte Fernández
- Luis Sedeño
- Juan de Gálvez

Authors of questionable membership:

- Pérez Rincón

== Bibliography ==
- Cañizares Esguerra, Jorge (2001). "La tradición clásica en el Perú virreinal". Hispanic American Historical Review. 81: 786–789. doi:10.1215/00182168-81-3-4-786. S2CID 142100123.
- Chang-Rodríguez, Raquel (2003). "Ecos andinos: Clarinda y Diego Mexía en la Primera parte del Parnaso Antártico (1605)" (PDF). Calíope: Journal of the Society for Renaissance and Baroque Hispanic Poetry (in Spanish). 9: 67–80.
- Chang-Rodríguez, Raquel. (2005). "Gendered Voices from Lima and Mexico: Clarinda, Amarilis, and Sor Juana". In Castillo, Susan; Schweitzer, Ivy (eds.). Companion to the Literatures of Colonial America. Malden, MA: Blackwell Publishing Ltd. pp. 277–291.
- González Echevarria, Roberto; Pupo-Walker, Enrique, eds. (1996). The Cambridge History of Latin American Literature: Discovery to Modernism. Cambridge: Cambridge University Press. ISBN 9780521340694.
- Higgins, James (1984). "Literature in Colonial Peru" (PDF). Reader in Latin American Literature. University of Liverpool.
- Rose, Sonia V. (2008). "Hacia un estudio de las élites letradas en el Perú virreinalel: caso de la Academia Antártica". In Myers, Jorge (ed.). Historia de los intelectuales en América Latina I: La ciudad letrada, de la conquista al modernismo (in Spanish). ISBN 978-84-96859-36-4.
- Sabat de Rivers, Georgina (1992). Estudios de literatura hispanoamericana: Sor Juana Inés de la Cruz y otras poetas barrocas de la colonia. Barcelona, Spain: P.P.U.
- Vélez-Sainz, Julio (2009). "De traducciones y translationes: la fundación de un sistema literario en la Academia Antártica de Diego de Mexía y Clarinda". Neophilologus. 93.

== External resources ==
- Wikipedia's Spanish-language Academia Antártica article.
- Partial text of Antonio Cornejo Polar's critical edition of "Discurso en loor de la poesía" at GoogleBooks.
- Partial text of The Cambridge History of Latin American Literature (ed. González Echevarria & Pupo-Walker) at GoogleBooks.
- Calíope: Journal of the Society for Renaissance & Baroque Hispanic Poetry. Published biannually at the University of Houston.
- Roberto González Echevarria's recommended reading on Spanish colonial literature at Encyclopædia Britannica.
- The Conference on Latin American History (CLAH)
- H-LATAM (the Latin American History list-serv) at h-Net.org.
