= Peruvian literature =

The term Peruvian literature not only refers to literature produced in the independent Republic of Peru, but also to literature produced in the Viceroyalty of Peru during the country's colonial period, and to oral artistic forms created by diverse ethnic groups that existed in the area during the prehispanic period, such as the Quechua, the Aymara and the Chanka South American native groups.

== Pre-Hispanic oral tradition ==
The artistic production of the pre-Hispanic period, especially art produced under the Incan Empire, is largely unknown. Literature produced in the central-Andean region of modern-day Ecuador, Perú, Bolivia and Chile, is thought to have been transmitted orally alone, though the quipu of the Inka and earlier Andean civilizations increasingly casts this into doubt. It consisted of two main poetic forms: harawis (from the Quechua language)--- a form of lyrical poetry---and hayllis--- a form of epic poetry. Both forms described the daily life and rituals of the time, and were recited by a poet known as the harawec.

Orally transmitted folktales expressed the cosmology of the Andean world, and included creation and destruction myths. Many of these stories have survived until the present, thanks in no small part to the efforts of early chroniclers such as Inca Garcilaso, who rediscovered Quechua poetry, and Guamán Poma de Ayala, who preserved mythology. Their inclusion in the "official canon" was a slow process, as they were not viewed with seriousness. For instance, Jose de la Riva Agüero, in his 1905 thesis Character of the Literature of Independent Peru considered the Pre-Hispanic literary tradition "insufficient" and unimportant in the formation of any new literary tradition. It was resurrected from obscurity in the 20th century, by a number of literary scholars and anthropologists who compiled and rescued Pre-Hispanic myths and legends. Among them are:

1. Adolfo Vienrich - Tarmap Pacha Huaray (translated as Azucenas quechuas or Quechuan lilies), compiled in 1905; and Tarmapap Pachahuarainin (translated as Fabulas Quechuas or Quechuan fables), compiled in 1906
2. Jorge Basadre - La literatura inca (Incan Literature), 1938; En torno a la literatura quechua (Regarding Quechua Literature), 1939.
3. José María Arguedas, who translated the Huarochirí Manuscript, a 17th-century text on indigenous Andean mythology and religion, also known as Hombres y dioses de Huarochirí (Men and Gods of Huarochiri)
4. Martin Lienhard - La voz y su huella. Escritura y conflicto étnico-cultural en América Latina. 1492-1988 (The Voice and its Influence: Scripture and Ethnocultural Conflict in Latin America. 1492–1988) 1992
5. Antonio Cornejo Polar - Escribir en el aire: ensayo sobre la heterogeneidad socio-cultural en las literaturas andinas (To Write in the Air: An Essay Concerning Socio-cultural Heterogeneity in Andean Literatures), 1994
6. Edmundo Bendezú - Literatura Quechua (Quechua Literature), 1980 and La otra literatura (The Other Literature), 1986

Bendezú affirms that Quechua oral tradition constitutes a marginal system opposed to the dominant Hispanicizing force. He speaks of a great tradition of "enormous textual mass" which was marginalized and sidelined by the Western scriptural system. Luis Alberto Sánchez, on the other hand, employed elements of the Pre-Hispanic tradition to illustrate his theory of a racially mixed "Creole" literature of both indigenous and Iberian parentage. To this end, he cited chronicles by authors such as Cieza, Betanzos and Garcilaso.

== Colonial literature ==
=== Literature of Peru's discovery and conquest ===
The literature of Peru's discovery and conquest includes all works produced in the region during its discovery and conquest by Spain. It can also refer to literature produced roughly around this time. The period begins on November 15, 1532, in Cajamarca with the capture of the last Inca lord, Atahualpa; it ends with the complete dismantling of the Incan Empire and the founding of the city of Lima. The principal literary manifestations of this period are in the form of chronicles of discovery, or are epistolary in nature. Major works which explore the literature of this time include Francisco Carrillo's Enciclopedia histórica de la literatura peruana (Historical Encyclopedia of Peruvian Literature), and various tomes by Raúl Porras Barrenechea which detail the works of the early chroniclers.

==== Spanish chroniclers ====
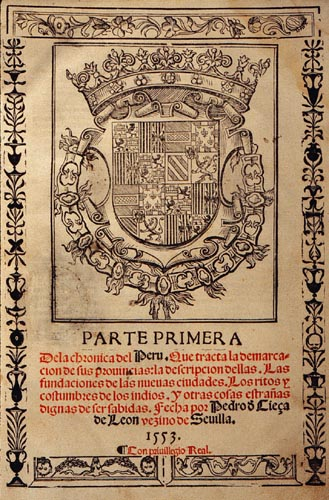
First page of the Chrónica del Perú by Pedro Cieza de León

According to Francisco Carrillo, the early chroniclers could be divided into various groups. The first is the group of chroniclers detailing the conquest. The majority of these were writers and soldiers who were responsible for producing official transcripts of military expeditions. There was also a small group of non-official chroniclers or personal diarists who provided unique personal insights on the effort to subdue and colonize the region. Both groups coexisted during the first period of the Peruvian conquest, which took place between 1532 and 1535.

For the most part, these chroniclers all wrote with the pretense that Spaniards had a right to dominion over it and should "bring them to knowledge of the true faith". Therefore, many of their descriptions and the motivations they ascribe to the indigenous peoples of the region are distorted and in error.

Among the official Spanish chroniclers were Francisco Xerez, personal secretary of Pizarro, who wrote the Verdadera relación de la conquista del Perú y provincia del Cuzco llamada la Nueva Castilla (The True Narrative of the Conquest of Peru and of Cuzco Province, Otherwise Known as New Castile), in 1534. He is also responsible for Relación Sámano-Xerez (the Samano-Xerez Narrative) of 1528, which details Pizarro's first expeditions of 1525 and 1527. His historical accounts are reiterated by Pedro Sancho de la Hoz, in his La Conquista de Peru (The Conquest of Peru), also of 1534.

Another official Spanish chronicler was Fray Gaspar de Carvajal, who produced the Relacion del descubrimiento del famoso río grande de las Amazonas (The Narrative of the Discovery of the Famous Great River of the Amazons) of 1541–1542, which described the first expedition and cartography of the Peruvian amazon territory, and of its towns and indigenous inhabitants.

Other Spanish chroniclers worth mentioning are:

1. Miguel de Estete - Noticia del Perú (News from Peru), 1535
2. Cristobal de Molina — a Chilean who was the first to write of the Indigenous inhabitants of the region in hisRelación de muchas cosas acaesidas en el Perú, en suma para atender a la letra la manera que se tuvo la conquista y poblazon destos reinos... (Narrative of Many Events Taken Place in Peru, Aiming to Correctly Record its Conquest and Inhabitants), 1552
3. Pedro Cieza de León -Crónica del Perú (Chronicle of Peru), published in 4 volumes: Parte primera de la Chrónica del Perú (First Volume of the Chronicle of Peru), 1550;El señorío de los Incas (The Lordship of the Incas), first published in 1873 but composed between 1548 and 1550; Descubrimiento y Conquista del Perú (The Discovery and Conquest of Peru), 1946; and the fourth volume, divided into five books: La guerra de las salinas (The Battle of the Salt Mines), La guerra de Chupas (The Battle of Chupas), La guerra de Quito (The Battle of Quito), La guerra de la Huarina (The Battle of Huarina) and La guerra de Jaquijaguana (The Battle of Jaquijaguan), published in 1877, 1881 and 1877 respectively.

==== Indigenous chroniclers ====
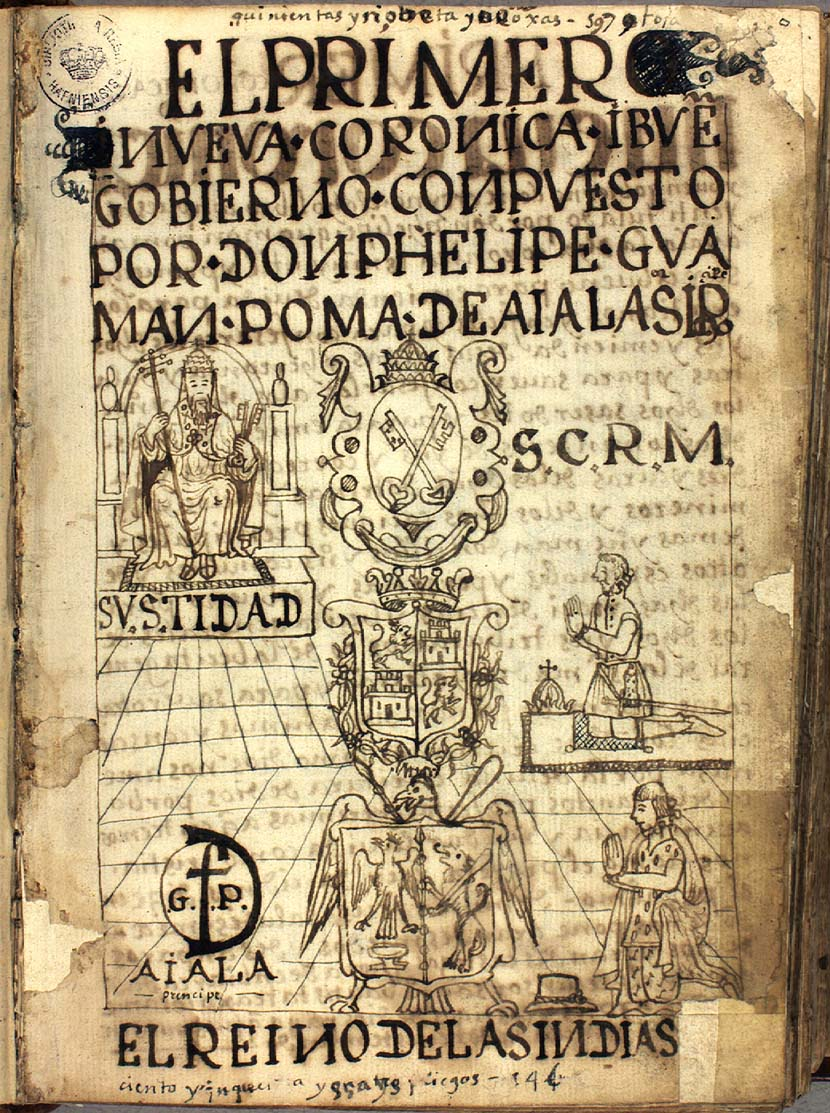
First page of the Primer nueva corónica y buen gobierno of Guamán Poma de Ayala.

There were a number of indigenous and mestizo chroniclers in Peru. Many of the indigenous chroniclers, such as Titu Cusi Yupanqui, were of royal Incan bloodlines. After familiarizing himself with Spanish culture, Yupanqui wrote Relación de cómo los españoles entraron en Pirú y el subceso que tuvo Mango Inca en el tiempo en que entre ellos vivió (The Narrative of How the Spaniards Entered Piru and Mango Inca's Experiences while Living Among Them) in 1570. In it, he presents a vision of his own history, and presents Incan creation myths, traditions and customs, historical memories and impressions regarding the conquest and colonial dominance. Other similar works are Juan de Santa Cruz Pachacuti Yamqui Salcamaygua's Relación de antiguedades deste reyno del Piru (Narrative of the Antiquity of this Kingdom of Piru) 1613, and Felipe Guamán Poma de Ayala's El primer nvueva corónica y bven govierno (First New Chronicle and Good Government) written between 1585 and 1615, but first published in 1936, in which the author details the devastation of the Andean world and tries to make sense of the chaotic reality in which the indigenous peoples find themselves. Juan de Santa Cruz Pachacuti also writes a chronicle in which he crudely attempts to explain the Inca cosmogony in rudimentary Spanish.

Guamán Poma, wrote an extensive 1179-page letter to the king of Spain, Philip III, in which he narrates the history of his universe and ends with a proposal for a utopic society. He embarks on a harsh criticism of the authorities, of the abusive priesthood, of the Spanish envoys and landed gentry, and of "mestizo" and creole society. In the words of Luis Alberto Sánchez, this long and futile letter constitutes an indictment of the colonial system.

== Modern literature ==
=== Neoclassical Peruvian literature ===
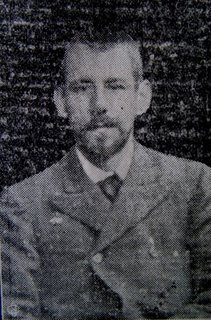
Adolfo Vienrich writer of Tarmap Pacha Huaray.

The hegemony of Creole oligarchy in Peruvian society favored the abandonment of indigenous forms in favor of European ones. Particularly successful among these were the imitation of Petrarch and the use of Greek and Roman mythological allusions, as practiced by the Academia Antártica literary group in Lima in the 16th and 17th centuries. Early writers associated with the Academia include Francisco de Figueroa, Diego Mexía de Fernangil, and the anonymous poets remembered only as "Clarinda" and "Amarilis". Later Neoclassicists, such as Manuel Asencio y Segura and Felipe Pardo y Aliaga, arose, too, and the genre dominated until the end of the 19th century.

=== 19th-century literary currents ===
The 19th-century brought Romanticism to Peru, with the works of Carlos Augusto Salaverry and José Arnaldo Márquez. Narrative prose developed away from the pastoral works of Manuel Ascensio Segura and Ricardo Palma) (see Costumbrismo) toward Modernism, with the works of Manuel González Prada and José Santos Chocano. There were also literary women who wrote in the romantic and modernista style but who also cultivated works that gravited toward [realism] and [naturalism]. These included Juana Manuela Gorriti, Teresa González de Fanning, Clorinda Matto de Turner, and Mercedes Cabellero de Carbonera.

=== Modernism in Peruvian literature ===
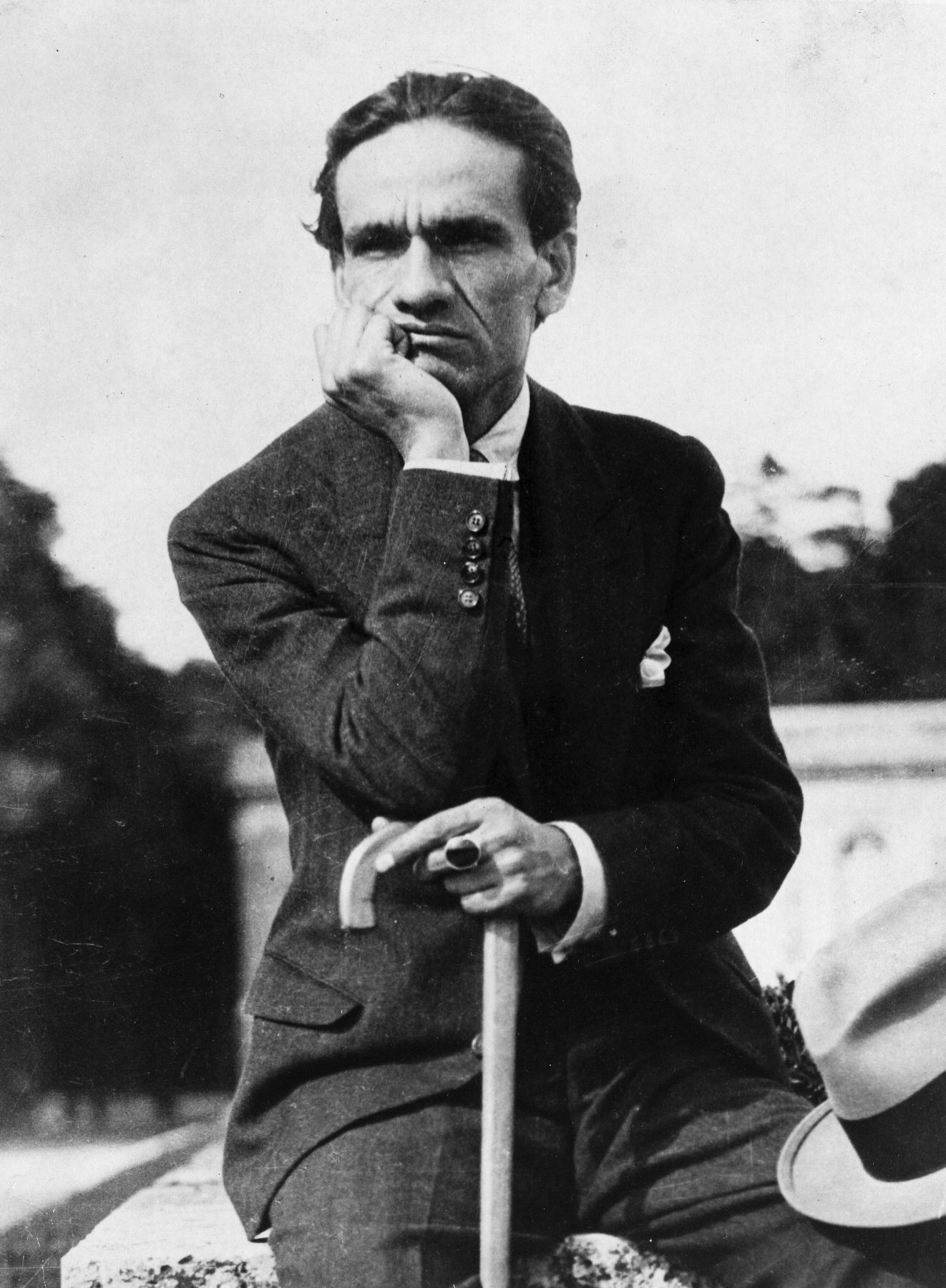
Cesar Vallejo, modernist in Los Heraldos Negros and vanguardist in Trilce

The general crisis following the War of the Pacific gave rise to Modernism in Peru. Its best-known exponents were José Santos Chocano and José María Eguren. Also notable but who has not received the critical attention she deserves is Aurora Cáceres, the author of two novels and a dozen works of non-fiction prose.

The Avant-garde movement was encouraged by the magazines Colónida and Amauta. Amauta was founded in 1926 by the prominent socialist essayist José Carlos Mariátegui. The influential poet César Vallejo was one of its collaborators. There were various splinter groups among the Avant-Gardist poets, whose major exponents were Xavier Abril, Alberto Hidalgo, Sebastián Salazar Bondy and Carlos Germán Belli.

Interest in indigenous poetry was resurrected by the work of Luis Fabio Xammar. Others who brought Indigenism to the fore were Ciro Alegría, José María Arguedas, and Manuel Scorza.

During the 1950s urban realism developed with the works of Julio Ramón Ribeyro and the playwright Sebastián Salazar Bondy. Realism is also the province of the major luminary Mario Vargas Llosa (Nobel laureate in literature), while Alfredo Bryce Echenique incorporated new narrative techniques within the genre.

Additionally, the literary work of José Adolph represents a decisive reconfiguration of Peruvian narrative through the integration of speculative genres with philosophical inquiry. His narratives frequently adopt a skeptical and disenchanted tone, reflecting a worldview marked by deep philosophical pessimism.

Some of the most notable names in poetry are Jorge Eduardo Eielson, Carlos Germán Belli, Antonio Cisneros, Wáshington Delgado, Marco Martos.

Noteworthy in narrative prose are: Miguel Gutiérrez, Gregorio Martínez, Alonso Cueto and Guillermo Niño de Guzmán, among others.

=== Contemporary Peruvian literature ===
Young writers include Jaime Bayly, Fernando Iwasaki, Iván Thays, Oscar Malca, Peter Elmore, Enrique Planas, César Silva Santisteban, Carlos Dávalos, Diego Trelles-Paz, Carlos Yushimito, Santiago Roncagliolo and Daniel Alarcón (finalist of PEN/Hemingway 2006 award). Other new Peruvian authors include Jose Pancorvo, Jorge Eslava, Rossella di Paolo, Domingo de Ramos, Ana Varela, Jorge Frisancho, Mariela Dreyfus, Gonzalo Portals, Alexis Iparraguirre, Pedro Félix Novoa, Lorenzo Helguero, José Carlos Yrigoyen, Montserrat Álvarez, Roxana Crisólogo, Miguel Ildefonso, Alberto Valdivia Baselli, Grecia Cáceres, and Xavier Echarri.

Literature for children

Two seminal writers in the creation of children's literature in Peru are Francisco Izquierdo Ríos, the founder of Peruvian children's stories and Carlota Carvallo de Núñez. They both belong to the a post-Second World war generation and devoted themselves entirely to literature for children. Earlier authors had certainly occasionally written children's fables, stories and poetry, but only sporadically and as an annex to their main literary work. In children's poetry, without a doubt, Mario Florián was the most important poet creating an entire and beautiful tradition dedicated to the Peruvian children. Among the many authors who write for Peruvian children are: Oscar Colchado Lucio, with his classic series of Andean adventures Cholito; Marcos Yauri Montero, with his Adventures of the Fox (Spanish: Aventuras del zorro), and Carlota Flores de Naveda, with Muki, the Little Bull (Spanish: Muki, el Torito).

Peruvian researchers who have written about literature for children includes the historian María Rostworowski with" Peruvian Legends for children" a work which rescues the Incan children's literature; professor José Respaldiza Rojas extensive work Jitanjáforas, the only book which on this topic; the journalists and researcher brothers Juan y Victor Ataucuri García, with Peruvian Fables, where they analyse more than fifty fables; the professor and songwriter Edgard Bendezú "Fabulinka", with his vast series Fabulinka, poems composed with an ingenious flavour; the researcher and poet Danilo Sánchez Lihón, the premier critic in the children's literature in Peruvian; professor and critic Jesus Cabel; the poet Rosa Cerna; the former president of the APLIJ (Peruvian Association of Children and Juvenile Literature) Eduardo de la Cruz Yataco; the teacher and poet Ruth Barrios, Roberto Rosario and others.

== See also ==
- List of Peruvian writers
- Latin American literature
