= Clarinda (poet) =

Peruvian poet

- Born: name unknown Viceroyalty of Peru
- Writing career
- Language: Spanish
- Period: colonial-era Latin America
- Genre: lyric poetry
- Notable work: "Discourse in Praise of Poetry"
- Movement: Antarctic Parnassus

Clarinda was the pen name used by an anonymous Peruvian poet, generally assumed to be a woman, who wrote in the early 17th century. The only work attributed to her is the long poem Discourse in Praise of Poetry (Discurso en loor de la poesía), which was printed in Seville in 1608. She is one of very few female, Spanish-speaking colonial-period poets whose work has not been lost. Thus, she is often read in partnership with Mexico's Sor Juana Inés de la Cruz and fellow Peruvian "Amarilis", whose identity is also uncertain.

== Identity and early life ==
Because she wrote under a pen name, and because no documentation definitively affirms her existence, Clarinda's identity is at best enigmatic. Her gender is itself a source of debate, though literary scholars like Georgina Sabat de Rivers and Raquel Chang-Rodríguez have isolated in Clarinda's poetry what they believe is a distinctly female voice.

Clarinda was born in the latter half of the 16th Century and was likely a member of the criollo caste, therefore of pure Spanish ancestry, born in the Spanish colonies. Her writing, which depends heavily on Greek and Biblical allusions, indicates that she was well read and educated. With few exceptions, women under Spanish colonial rule were not encouraged to write, and women who did write typically learned to do so on their own and knowing their work would not find acceptance from the men who dominated the literary tradition. Fear of rejection or persecution may have been what prompted Clarinda to adopt a pseudonym.

However, restrictions on women interested in literature were looser in the colonies than in Europe, and Clarinda seems to have been granted access to the literary circles in colonial Peru. Her writing is characteristic of the Academia Antártica, a society of poets in Lima who shared and discussed literary texts. She may herself have been a member of this society.

== Discourse in Praise of Poetry ==
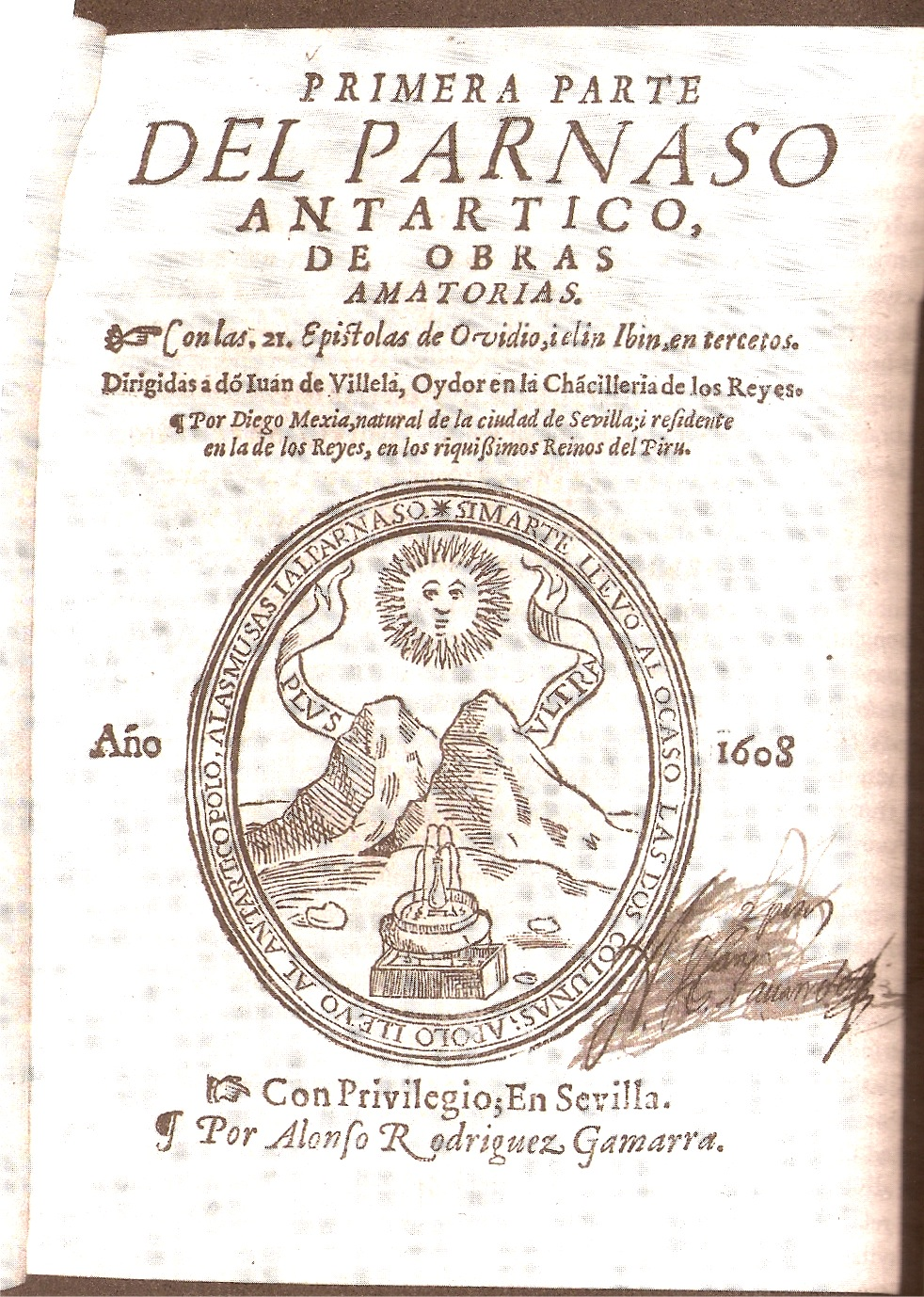
Title Page from Mexía de Fernangil's translation of Ovid's Heroides, which includes Clarinda's "Discourse in Praise of Poetry". Published in 1608 in Seville, Spain.

=== Publication ===
In 1608, Discourse in Praise of Poetry (Discurso en loor de la poesía) was published in the prologue to a new Spanish translation of Ovid's Heroides by the poet Diego Mexía de Fernangil. The notes accompanying the poem indicate that its author is a "señora principal" (foremost lady) in Peru who requested that her work be published under the pen name Clarinda.

Mexía de Fernangil was a Spaniard but had lived for a time in the viceroyalties of Mexico and Peru, and in Lima he was a member of the Academia Antártica, which perhaps explains Clarinda's association with him. Discourse in Praise of Poetry is the only poem credited to Clarinda, though commentators have suggested that it was penned by the same woman who wrote the Epístola a Bernardo, published in 1621, which is typically attributed to the anonymous poet known as "Amarilis".

As printed in Antonio Cornejo Polar's critical edition, the poem is composed of 269 three-line stanzas and takes as its subject the acclamation of poetry—with emphasis on the poetry of Mexía de Fernangil. Cornejo Polar explains in his footnotes that "[t]odo el texto tiene como motivo principal alabar la figura de Diego Mexia de Fernangil" (the entire text adopts the primary goal of praising the figure Diego Mexía de Fernangil); however, other critics believe the poem's main objective is the insistence that Spanish colonists are just as capable as Europeans of literary invention.

Thus far, no English-language translation of the poem has been published.

=== Sample ===
In Petrarchan fashion, and following the literary trends of early 17th Century Spanish colonial literature, Clarinda invokes mythological figures, such as Apollo, the Muses, and Orpheus, in her verses:

La mano y el favor de la Cirene,
a quien Apolo amó con amor tierno;
y el agua consagrada de Hipocrene

y aquella lira con que del Averno
Orfeo libertó su dulce esposa,
suspendiendo las furias del infierno;

la célebre armonía milagrosa
de aquél cuyo testudo pudo tanto,
que dio muralla a Tebas la famosa;

el platicar suave, vuelta en llanto,
y en sola voz, que a Júpiter guardaba,
y al Juna entretenía y daba espanto;

el verso con que Homero eternizaba
lo que del fuerte Aquiles escrebía,
y aquella vena con que lo ditaba,

quisiera que alcanzaras, Musa mia,
para que en grave y sublimado verso
cantaras en loor de la poesía. (1-18)

A professional translation into English. From Google Translate:

The hand and favor of Cyrene,
whom Apollo loved tenderly;
and Hippocrene's consecrated water

and that lyre with which, from Avernus,
Orpheus liberated his sweet wife,
suspending the rages of Hell;

the renowned wonderful harmony
of he whose [testudo] could do so much,
who gave walls to Thebes the famous;

the smooth conversation, full of weeping,
and in single voice, that protected Jupiter,
and whiled away and frightened Juno;

the verse that Homer eternalized,
that he wrote for strong Achilles,
and in that vein with which he recited it,

I would that you arrive, my Muse,
so that in solemn and sublime verse
you will sing in praise of poetry. (1-18)

== Legacy ==
Clarinda's Discourse in Praise of Poetry has, in the more than three centuries since its publication, become one of Peru's most lauded texts. It is "one of the most celebrated products of the Academia Antártica", and it has greatly surpassed in fame the Mexía de Fernangil translation it preceded in its initial publication. Some contemporary scholars view the poem as a fundamental piece in Peru's literary history and an influence on later Peruvian writers like José Maria Arguedas and Ciro Alegría.

=== Feminist responses ===
The fact that Clarinda, probably a woman, composed and even published poetry despite widespread disdain for female writers in colonial Spanish America is typically depicted by feminist critics as a story of personal triumph via autodidacticism. Feminist critics have also endeavored to solidify the interpretation of Discourse in Praise of Poetry as a distinctly female voice, despite the puzzle of Clarinda's true identity. The evidence most commonly put forward in defense of Clarinda's femaleness are the notes that accompany the poem in its first publication (described above). The poem also catalogues, mostly through allusions, an arresting number of female "savants and writers from a variety of traditions and historical periods". These include references to Sappho, the Virgin Mary, and many others. Many critics interpret this list as Clarinda's attempt to create a space for female voice within the male-dominated genre of colonial lyric poetry.

== Bibliography ==
- Anderson Imbert, Enrique, ed. Spanish American Literature: A History. Detroit, Michigan: Wayne State University Press, 1963.
- Chang-Rodríguez, Raquel. "Clarinda, Amarilis y la "Fruta nueva del Parnaso peruano". Colonial Latin American Review 4 (1995): 180-195.
- Chang-Rodríguez, Raquel. "Clarinda's Catalogue of Worthy Women in Her Discurso en Loor de la Poesía". Calíope: Journal of the Society of Renaissance and Baroque Hispanic Poetry 4 (1998): 94-106.
- Chang-Rodríguez, Raquel. "Gendered Voices from Lima and Mexico: Clarinda, Amarilis, and Sor Juana". Companion to the Literatures of Colonial America. Ed. Susan Castillo and Ivy Schweitzer. Malden, Massachusetts: Blackwell Publishing Ltd., 2005. 277-291.
- Clarinda. "Discurso en loor de la poesía". "Discurso en loor de la poesía": Estudio y edición.. 2nd Edition. Ed. Antonio Cornejo Polar. Lima, Peru; Berkeley, California: Centro de Estudios Literarios, 2000.
- González Echevarria, Roberto, and Enrique Pupo-Walker, eds. The Cambridge History of Latin American Literature: Discovery to Modernism. Cambridge: Cambridge University Press, 1996.
- Moraña, Mabel, ed. Mujer culta en la Colonia hispanoamericana. Pittsburgh, Pennsylvania: Instituto Internacional de Literatura Iberoamericana, 1996.
- Pérez-Blanco, Lucrecio. "'Discurso en loor de la poesía'. El otro lazarillo ético-estético de la literatura hispanoamericana del siglo XVII". Quinto centenario 16 (1990): 209-237.
- Sabat de Rivers, Georgina. Estudios de literatura hispanoamericana: Sor Juana Inés de la Cruz y otras poetas barrocas de la colonia. Barcelona, Spain: P.P.U., 1992.

== External Resources ==
- Wikipedia's Spanish-language Clarinda article.
- Full text of "Discurso en loor de la poesía" at PoemasDe.net.
- Full text of "Discurso en loor de la poesía" at yPoemas.com.
- Partial text of Antonio Cornejo Polar's critical edition of "Discurso en loor de la poesía" at GoogleBooks.
- Lucrecio Pérez-Blanco's annotated edition of "Discurso en loor de la poesía" at the Universidad Complutense.
- Partial text of The Cambridge History of Latin American Literature (ed. González Echevarria & Pupo-Walker) at GoogleBooks.
- Calíope: Journal of the Society for Renaissance & Baroque Hispanic Poetry. Published biannually at the University of Houston.
- The Gendering Latin American Research Project (2001–2006). Hosted by the Department of Hispanic and American Studies, University of Nottingham, in collaboration with the Department of Spanish and Portuguese Studies, University of Manchester.
- Raquel Chang-Rodríguez's Professional Website at the City University of New York (CUNY).
- Roberto González Echevarria's recommended reading on Spanish colonial literature at Encyclopædia Britannica.
- H-LATAM (the Latin American History list-serv) at h-Net.org.
