= Juan de Espinosa Medrano =

Peruvian Indigenous cleric and polymath (c. 1630–1688)

- Born: 1630? Cuzco, Viceroyalty of Peru
- Died: 1688; Cuzco, Viceroyalty of Peru
- Resting place: Cathedral of Cuzco
- Other names: Lunarejo, Sublime Doctor, Indian Demosthenes, Tertullian of America, Creole Phoenix
- Education: Seminary of Saint Anthony the Abbot in Cuzco
- Era: Colonial Spanish America (17th century)
- Known for: Writing the most famous literary apologetic discourse in Colonial America; displaying a Latin American proto-nationalist conscience and identity (called 'Criollo conscience'); being a model for the Latin American contemporary writer.
- Notable work: El robo de Proserpina y sueño de Endimión (c. 1650), Amar su propia muerte (c. 1650), El hijo pródigo (c. 1657), Apologético en favor de Luis de Góngora (1662), Philosophia Thomistica (1688), La Novena Maravilla (1695).
- Style: Baroque

Juan de Espinosa Medrano (Calcauso?, 1630? – Cuzco, 1688), known in history as Lunarejo ("The Spotty-Faced"), was an Indigenous cleric, sacred preacher, writer, playwright, theologian and polymath from the Viceroyalty of Peru. He is the most prominent figure of the Literary Baroque of Peru and one of the most important intellectuals from Colonial Spanish America (along with the New Spain writers Sor Juana Inés de la Cruz and Carlos de Sigüenza y Góngora).

Juan de Espinosa Medrano is the author of the most famous literary apologetic discourse in the Americas in the 17th century: the Apologético en favor de Don Luis de Góngora (1662). He also wrote autos sacramentales in Quechua; the Spanish comedies El robo de Proserpina y sueño de Endimión (c. 1650) and El hijo pródigo (c. 1657), out of which only the biblical play Amar su propia muerte (c. 1650) is preserved; panegyric sermons, compiled after his death in a volume called La Novena Maravilla (1695); and a course in Latin of thomistic philosophy, Philosophia Thomistica (1688).

He acquired fame in life for the stylistic distinction and conceptual depth of his oeuvre (which was praised for its first-rate accordance to the scholastic and baroque epistemological parameters of his time). His polymathy, erudition and poetic ingenuity in the composition of sermons and literary works gained him the epithets of Sublime Doctor and Indian Demosthenes, as well as the less frequent ones of Criollo Phoenix and Tertullian of the Americas (all used to refer to him while alive). Additionally, after the Peruvian independence from Spanish Imperial rule took place, Juan de Espinosa Medrano's memory begun to be used as an exemplary model of the intellectual and moral potential of the peoples from South America (criollo, mestizos and indigenous populations included).

The circumstances of Juan de Espinosa Medrano's origin, and the details about his first years of life, are—almost in their entirety—unknown. The absence of significant biographical data put forward in the will written by the own author days before his death has further led to speculation about his ethnicity (or race) and identification. It has also led to manipulation and tendentious interpretations of the data preserved about his existence; such distortive reading has been especially pronounced in the many works of biographers, critics or commentators, akin to the political agenda of Indigenismo in Peru. What is incontrovertible, however, is that Juan de Espinosa Medrano always regarded himself both as Criollo and Spanish (an ideological servant of the Empire); evidences for such self-identification are to be found in his oeuvre, in which Juan de Espinosa Medrano sides constantly with the Spaniards, and often describes Native American populations as "enemies", "barbarous" and "idolatrous" (he does not link himself with Native American peoples' cultures and ethnicity, and it is also unthinkable that an indigenous person could have held the power and clergy positions he did during his lifetime).

His vast baroque production, written in Spanish, Latin and Quechua–in an aesthetic register different to the dialects now extant–was published both in America and Europe, however, only at the end of his life in the Old World. It had impact exclusively in the Viceroyalty of Peru, nonetheless, particularly because of a sabotage plan carried out by Jesuit priests in Rome at the end of the 17th century, which succeeded in impeding the circulation of Juan de Espinosa Medrano's philosophic course in Latin across the Old World (the aforementioned Philosophia Thomistica). It was in this period that the Jesuit University of Saint Ignatius of Loyola contended with the Seminary of Saint Anthony the Abbot in Cuzco (the institution that Juan de Espinosa Medrano represented) for the maintenance of its right in exclusivity to grant the degree of doctor to those instructed in Theology (a situation that forced the Seminary students, of Thomist instruction, to present themselves before a jury of Jesuit theologians–followers of the doctrine of Francisco Suárez–for the evaluation leading to the conferral of their degree).

In the present, the mysteries of his biography and the intrinsic quality of his literary production notwithstanding, the study of the works and life of Juan de Espinosa Medrano has extensively fallen to relegation or oblivion. This way, even if a certain part of his biography still survives in the oral tradition of the region of Apurímac (where it has acquired unusual characteristics) in Cusco as well as in the Peruvian Literary Canon, knowledge of his life and work circumscribes mostly to scholars of literature in Colonial Spanish America.

== Origin and first years ==
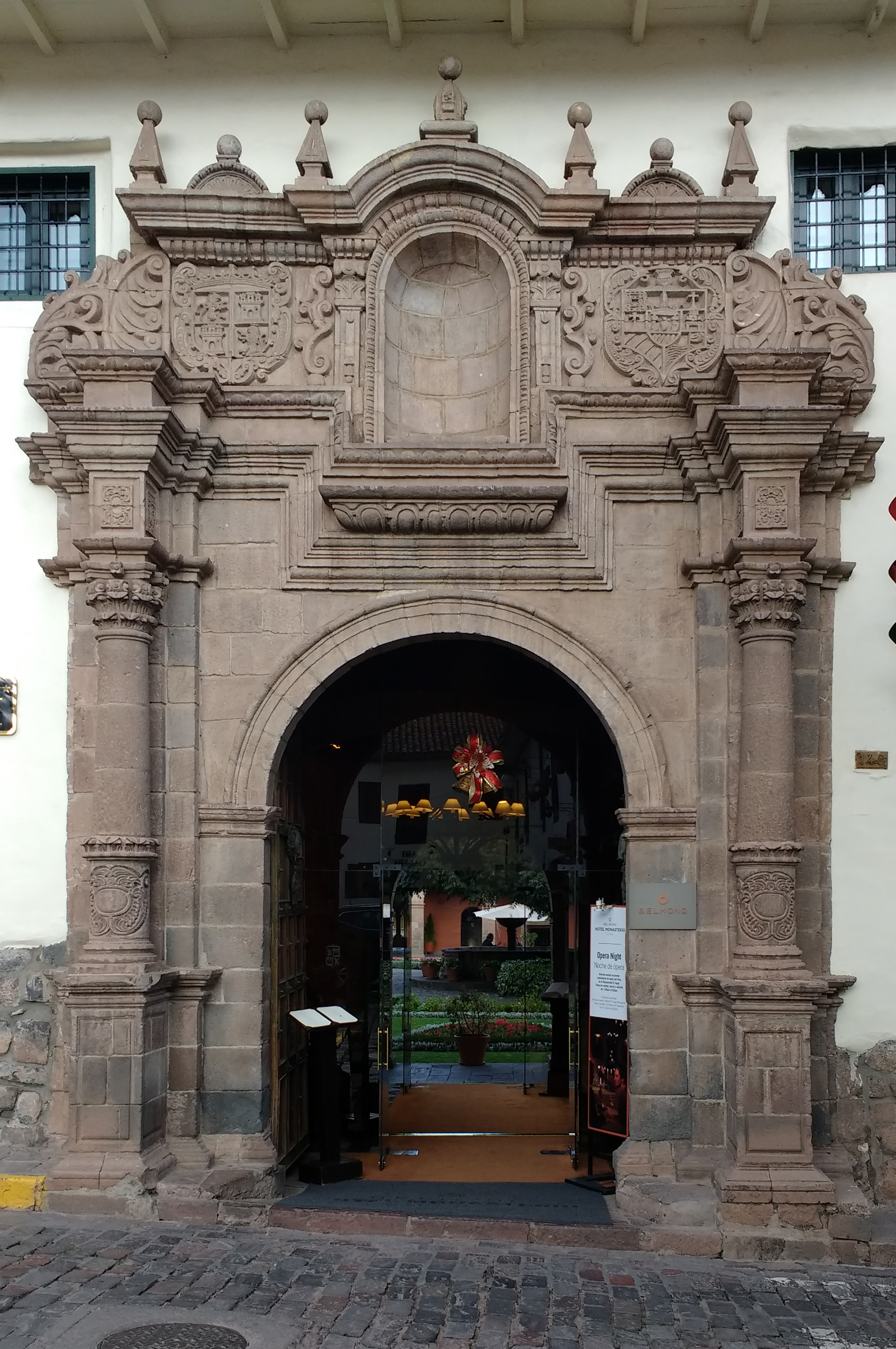
Present state of the Seminary of Saint Anthony the Abbot in Cuzco (located in Plaza Nazarenas in the contemporary city of Cusco). The Seminar's facilities have been divided and today make a hotel, a museum and a parish.

After a series of studies and archive analysis, the space-time coordinate of Calcauso, 1630, appears to be the most accurate intersection in which to place the origin (the birth) of Juan de Espinosa Medrano. Of his parents, their ethnicity, condition and lineage, nothing is known; such complete lack of information serves, however, as a principle for the deduction of absence of nobility in the author and his family —being most likely that Juan de Espinosa Medrano grew up in a humble, rural environment. This setting is, at the same time, somewhat suggestive of a possible case of miscegenation.

Consequently, Agustín Cortés de la Cruz's —disciple and first biographer of the author— assertion about the origin of Espinosa Medrano should be taken as true: "in his first stages, scant favor he received from what the vulgus calls Fortune". Likewise, Clorinda Matto de Turner's novelization of the author's life as: "He who entered the world in humble cradle, set foot on the steps of book and prayer... Then ascended to reach the literary skies of the America of the South, as king of stars there he shined". In an imperial society in which access to intellectual enterprise was circumscribed to the nobles and highborns, Espinosa Medrano achieved prominent instruction, overcoming the difficulties of a rural, unprivileged genesis. This reality does not guarantee, however, that he was an indio (as Clorinda Matto and the oral tradition asseverate) for he would not have become a sacred preacher and reached fortune and power in Cuzco had this been the case (such activities and wealth were then inaccessible to the native castes).

The enigma of Juan de Espinosa Medrano's origin acts (still) as a recurrent stimulus for the creation of an oral and imaginary biography in which the author is an Indian. The model for such constant imagination in Peru lies on the biographical approximation to the author that Clorinda Matto undertook at the end of the 19th century (Clorinda Matto de Turner made Espinosa Medrano the subject of an "indigenist" legend, imputing indigenous ancestry to him, "but archival research has shown that there is no evidence that Espinosa Medrano was a pitifully poor Indian, but on the contrary, that he was a man of fairly substantial means closer to the figure of a 'baroque gentleman' ").

== The early and indigenous biography of Juan de Espinosa Medrano by Clorinda Matto ==
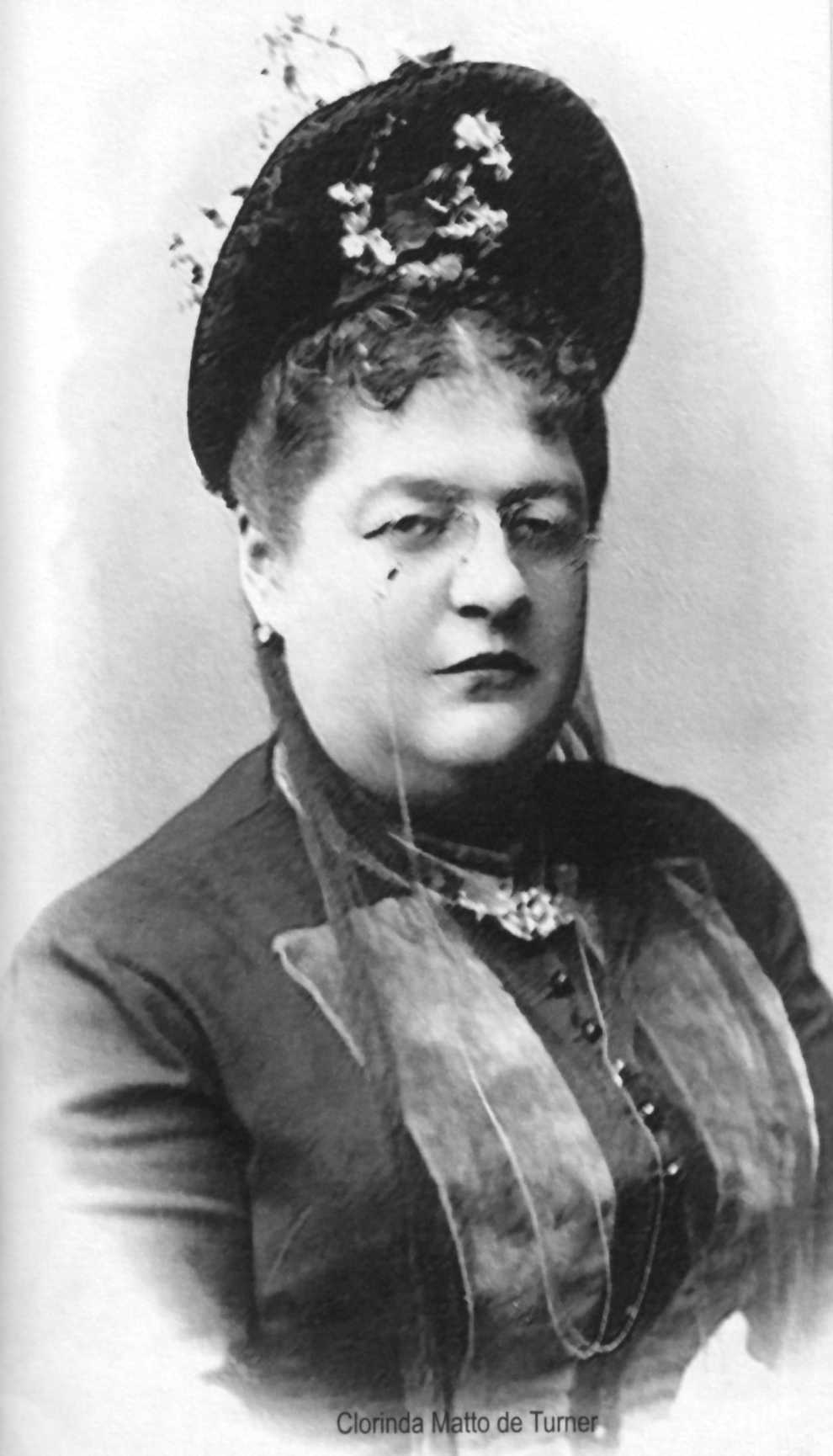
Clorinda Matto de Turner, author of a biography on Juan de Espinosa Medrano titled "Don Juan de Espinosa Medrano —that is— the Spotty-Faced Doctor" —included in Pencil Sketches of Acclaimed Americans (1890). Her biographical construction of Espinosa Medrano is now the most familiar in Peruvian popular culture and the Andean provinces in the Republic of Peru.

Clorinda Matto de Turner published her famous biographical study "Don Juan de Espinosa Medrano —that is— the Spotty-Faced Doctor" in 1887 in Lima, the capital of Peru. Three years later, after small corrections, she published the biographical study again in Pencil Sketches of Acclaimed Americans (1890), book that includes a chapter on Juan de Espinosa Medrano that Clorinda Matto was able to elaborate after obtaining data from the oral tradition in rural Peru.

Clorinda Matto's biographical study is, in substantial sections, barely rigorous for it is troubled by the absence of documentary evidence —a void that she seeks to fill through an exercise of fictionalization of the life of Espinosa Medrano. Such purpose (though still laudable for its exaltation of the author) has led the present academic community to question the legitimacy of her biography up to such a dramatic point that, in the present, her work is no longer considered legitimate or true (on the contrary, her biography is now discarded as a source for fantasy, especially for its lack of historical objectivity). The manifest ideological character that the text also displays —and that Clorinda Matto does not pretend to camouflage— has further led to the dismissal of her biographical attempt as inaccurate. It is, in summary, averse to the aspiration to truth present in biographical works of such nature.

Clarification in place, it is nonetheless necessary to briefly refer to the biography of Espinosa Medrano as it was composed in 1887/1890 by Clorinda Matto. For her biography is still the most influential source for Peruvian popular imagination of the author, as well as the most and only known outside of the academic world.

According to Clorinda Matto, Juan de Espinosa Medrano was the offspring of an indigenous conjugal union, that of Agustín Espinosa and Paula Medrano, humble parents that raised their little child "in a shack at the joyous town". At seven, Juan started his education at the class for infants taught by the priest of Mollebamba, class where —besides being a remarkable student— Juan de Espinosa Medrano would also receive instruction to act as sacristan of the parish (the parish is, according to Clorinda Matto's biography, the place in which Espinosa Medrano discovered both the religious and literate vocation that would later flourish in him as time went by).

After a period of instruction and service in favor of the priest of Mollebamba, Juan de Espinosa Medrano would start a life in the city of Cuzco as an indio servant. According to Matto, there he would obtain admission into the Seminary of Saint Anthony the Abbot, precinct where the young Juan de Espinosa Medrano would quickly develop mastery of different musical instruments and skill in seven languages. He would also reach expertise in sciences and grammar, according to this biography, erudition that would cause admiration in his contemporaries.

Espinosa Medrano would finally obtain the degree of Doctor, at eighteen years old, in the Jesuit University of Saint Ignatius of Loyola. From that point onwards, he would have to defy the common prejudice that asserted that no Indian could take hold of ecclesiastical charges of significance in Cuzco.

== Ecclesiastical career and intellectual endeavors ==
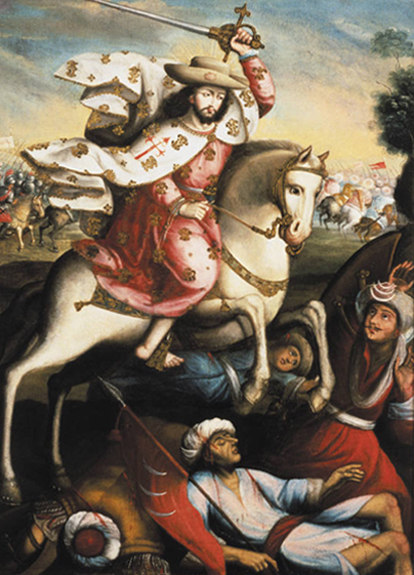
"The panegyric prayer to James the Great (or Moorslayer)" is one fundamental texts to consult in order to understand Juan de Espinosa Medrano's cultural self-identification. The sermon was preached in the Cathedral of Cuzco and later published in the volume La Novena Maravilla (The Ninth Wonder).

Documentation found indicates that by the year 1645, when he was about fifteen years old, Juan de Espinosa Medrano was a student in the Seminary of Saint Anthony the Abbot. His tutors in this institution were: Francisco de Loyola, Augustinian prior and cofounder, in 1559, of the Monastery of Saint Augustine in Cuzco —Loyola stated that young Juan was "an exceptional prowess, and also very virtuous"—; Juan de Cárdenas y Céspedes, famous dean of the Seminary of Saint Anthony the Abbot in Cuzco (from 1632 to 1702, the year he passed away); and Alonso Bravo de Paredes y Quiñones, sacred preacher and professor of philosophy at the Seminary —Paredes y Quiñones was also a censor of the Apologético). Juan de Espinosa Medrano's studies must have extended until 1649 or 1650, years that provide records of him now in charge of the art classes at the Seminary. Between 1655 and 1657, Espinosa Medrano would acquire the degree of Doctor in Theology (after evaluation at the Jesuit University of Saint Ignatius of Loyola), performing as professor of such sacred discipline at the Seminary starting from 1658.

In 1655, Juan de Espinosa Medrano's ecclesiastical career starts. He serves, in the first place, at the Parish of the Sanctum (Parroquia del Sagrario) where he conducts a series of marriage ceremonies and baptisms —a final one documentally registered in 1659. In 1656, Juan de Espinosa Medrano begins his sacred preaching career. His first sermon "The panegyric prayer to Our Lady of Antiquity" ("La oración panegírica a Nuestra Señora de la Antigua") is followed by the "First sermon to Saint Anthony the Abbot" ("Sermón Primero de San Antonio Abad"), preached in 1658; the "First Sermon to Saint Blaise, bishop and martyr" ("Sermón de San Blas obispo y mártir"), preached in 1659; and "The panegyric prayer to James the Great (or Moorslayer)" ("Oración panegírica al glorioso Apóstol Santiago") in 1660, perhaps the most important sermon for the comprehension of Juan de Espinosa Medrano's oeuvre. In 1662, in Lima, the Apologetic in defense of Luis de Góngora (Apologético en favor de Don Luis de Góngora) is published. It is important to highlight, however, that Espinosa Medrano's intellectual activity in the profane had already started in the decade of 1650 —the biblical play To Love One's Own Death (Amar su propia muerte) had been written c. 1650; the autos sacramentales The Seizure of Proserpine and the Dream of Endymion (El robo de Proserpina y sueño de Endimión) and The Prodigal Son (El hijo pródigo) had also been written c.1650 and c.1657 respectively.

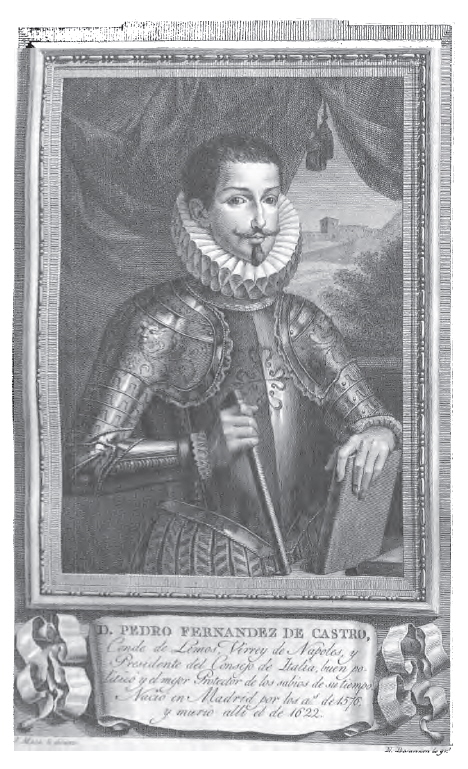
Portrait of the Viceroy Count of Lemos. According to written records, the Viceroy ordered his entourage that Juan de Espinosa Medrano's works be sent to the printing press in Spain.

From 1664 to 1680, Juan de Espinosa Medrano continues writing panegyric sermons to be preached in diverse religious precincts of Cuzco. Among the most important are the "Sermon for the Funeral of Philip IV" ("Sermón a las Exequias de Felipe IV") in 1666 and the "Panegyric Prayer to the Immaculate Conception of Our Lady" ("Oración Panegírica a la Concepción de Nuestra Señora") in 1670. Espinosa Medrano further advanced in his ecclesiastical career by acting as priest of Juliaca from 1660 to 1668. That year a miners uprising takes places in the town of Laicacota, the same that is repressed by the Viceroy Pedro Antonio Fernández de Castro, Count of Lemos. From 1669 to 1676, Espinosa Medrano takes charge of the parish of Chincheros (today part of the Sacred Valley of the Incas). Finally, from 1678 to 1683/1684 he acts as priest of the parish of Saint Cristopher (San Cristóbal), one of the most important Indian parishes of Cuzco even today.

From this period in the adult life of Juan de Espinosa Medrano it is necessary to highlight two events in which he demonstrated his prowess to peoples in possession of high positions in the Spanish Imperial System.

The first event corresponds

El primer evento corresponde a la visita al Cuzco del Virrey Conde de Lemos en 1668, paso que permite al Virrey la lectura (o audición) de obras líricas y sagradas de Juan de Espinosa Medrano, las mismas que quizás fueron preparadas para su recepción. El evento es fundamental por demostrar, en la biografía del author, reconocimiento oficial a la distinción de su producción barroca (cuya singularidad los coterráneos alababan). Según el testimonio del ya mencionado primer biógrafo y albacea, Agustín Cortés de la Cruz, "El señor Conde de Lemos luego que oyó en el Cuzco algunas obras y versos [de Espinosa Medrano] con que le celebró el Colegio de San Antonio, los hizo trasladar, sin que quedase papel que no fuese digno de su estimación, por darlos a la estampa en España". Lamentablemente, nada concreto se sabe sobre la veracidad y el paradero de este traslado de su obra a Europa.

El segundo evento de importancia para la biografía de Juan de Espinosa Medrano corresponde al envío de una carta a Carlos II, Rey de España, por parte del obispo del Cuzco, Manuel de Mollinedo y Angulo en 1678. Este evento muestra, con mayor claridad, la admiración y alta estima que se tenía hacia al author tanto por parte del ámbito religioso como también por parte del letrado en la ciudad. El nombre de Juan de Espinosa Medrano —se ve aquí— empieza a ser difundido más allá del obispado colonial del Cuzco y el Virreinato del Perú. El obispo recomienda en la carta la asignación de un puesto en la Catedral del Cuzco para Espinosa Medrano y escribe al rey: "es el sujeto más digno que tiene el obispado por sus muchas y relevantes letras y virtud".

It is known that he entered the Dominican seminary of San Antonio Abad in Cuzco. There, as a young student, he wrote many of his plays. He wrote plays in both Spanish and Quechua. He wrote in Spanish the drama Amar su propia muerte (To Love One's Own Death) (ca. 1645). Characters of this play include Sísara, a general of Canaan; Jabín, king of Canaan; Jael; Barac, a general of the armies of Israel.

"Titubeó el tropel de sus peñascos, / al tremolar mis bélicos damascos, / y al furibundo grito de mis tropas / encorvaron sus álamos las copas."

— Sísara, Jornada I, Scene 1, Amar su propia muerte.

He wrote in Quechua a religious play, El hijo pródigo (also known as Auto sacramental del hijo pródigo; The Prodigal Son), as well as a mythological piece, El rapto de Proserpina (The Abduction of Proserpina). The theatrical piece Ollantay is also attributed to him.

He also wrote a piece defending Góngora's poetry called Apologético en favor de Don Luis de Góngora, Príncipe de los poetas lyricos de España: contra Manuel de Faria y Sousa, Cavallero portugués (1662). In the Apologético, published in Lima in 1662, Espinosa Medrano eruditely displays his knowledge of classical and contemporary literature. To support his arguments, Espinosa Medrano refers to, among others, the works of Apuleius, Augustine of Hippo, the Bible, Camoens, Miguel de Cervantes, Erasmus, Faria, Garcilaso, Homer, Lope de Vega, and Pedro de Oña. His defense of Góngora has been viewed as "a plea for recognition on behalf of himself and of writers living and working on the periphery of the Spanish empire."

Antonio Cortéz de la Cruz, one of his disciples, collected Espinosa Medrano's sermons and published them posthumously in Valladolid, in a book entitled La novena maravilla (The Ninth Wonder) (1695).

Espinosa Medrano also wrote La Lógica (Logic), the first volume of a tract devoted to the philosophy of Saint Thomas Aquinas, which was published in Rome in 1688.

== Sources ==
- Atlas departamental del Perú, varios autores, Ediciones Peisa S.A., Lima, Perú, 2003 ISBN 9972-40-257-6
- El Perú en los tiempos modernos, Julio R. Villanueva Sotomayor, Ediciones e Impressiones Quebecor World Perú S.A., Lima, Perú, 2002.
- Historia de la República del Perú, Jorge Basadre Grohmann, Diario "El Comercio", Lima, Perú, 2005. ISBN 9972-205-62-2.
- Nuevo Atlas del Perú y el Mundo, Juan Augusto Benavides Estrada, Editorial Escuela Nueva S.A., Lima, Perú, 1991.
