= Ajos y zafiros =

Ajos y zafiros (meaning Garlic and Sapphires) is a Peruvian magazine specializing in Peruvian and Latin American literature published by the Asociación Ajos & Zafiros.

== History ==
The magazine was founded in 1998 by students of the Universidad Nacional Mayor de San Marcos. Its first director was Marcel Velázquez Castro, accompanied by Richard Henríquez Robles, Agustín Prado Alvarado, Frida Poma Escudero and Maia Rojas Brückmann. In 2000, the magazine was headed by Velázquez Castro, José Cabrera and Prado Alvarado. From 2002 to 2007, Alberto Valdivia Baselli directed; from 2004 to 2007 he was its sole director. Currently the magazine is published by the Asociación Ajos & Zafiros, chaired by Velázquez Castro and Valdivia-Baselli, directed by José Cabrera, Agustín Prado Alvarado and Frida Poma Escudero.

Literature reviews the magazine are conducted by writers and literary scholars of the Pontificia Universidad Católica del Perú and the National University of San Marcos (UNMSM) with writers such as Elio Vélez Marquina, Milagros Munive Córdova, Patricia Colchado, Moisés Sánchez Franco, Johnny Zevallos, Víctor Quiroz, Lis Arévalo Hidalgo, Fernando Iriarte, Penélope Vilallonga, Christian Bernal Méndez, Américo Mendoza Mori, Claudia Berríos and Nehemías Vega.

In December 2007, the magazine published a double issue whose principal subject was "Ocho ensayos de interpretación de la violencia interna en el Perú" ("Eight trials interpretation of domestic violence in Peru.")
