= Francisco Izquierdo =

Francisco Izquierdo may refer to:

- Francisco Izquierdo Ríos (1910–1981), Peruvian writer and teacher
- Francisco Izquierdo Vargas (fl. 1900s), Chilean lawyer and politician
