= Tébar =

Tébar, Spain
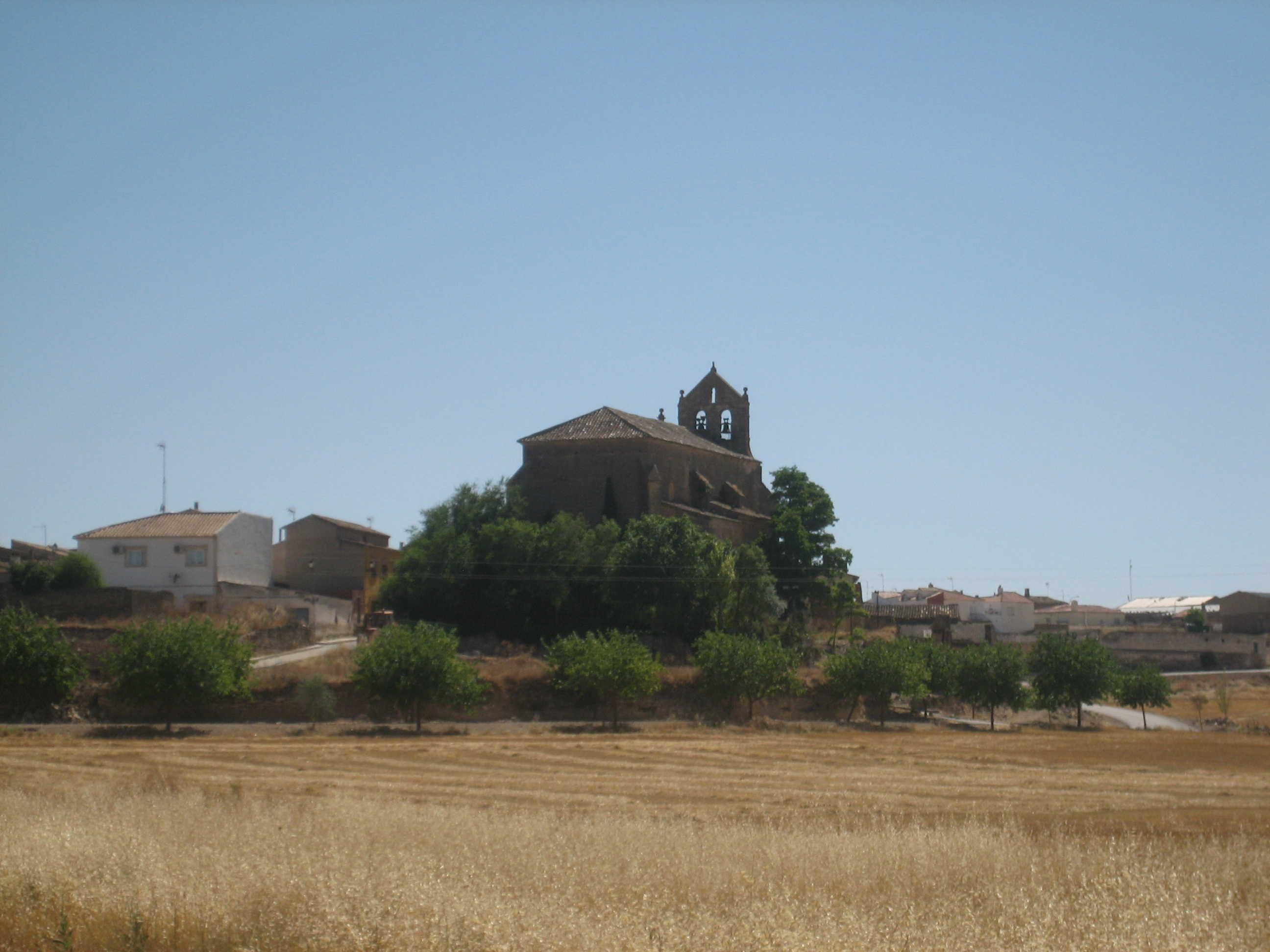
- View of the Church of our Lady of the Assumption in Tebar

- Flag Coat of arms

- Location within Spain Location within Castilla-La Mancha
- Country: Spain
- Autonomous community: Castile-La Mancha
- Province: Cuenca
- Municipality: Tébar

Area
  - Total: 99 km^{2} (38 sq mi)

Population (2025-01-01)
  - Total: 300
  - Density: 3.0/km^{2} (7.8/sq mi)
- Time zone: UTC+1 (CET)
  - Summer (DST): UTC+2 (CEST)

Tébar is a municipality located in the province of Cuenca, Castile-La Mancha, Spain. It has a surface area of 99,02 km2. According to the 2017 census (INE), the municipality has a population of 283 inhabitants.

== Notable people ==
- Luis Tribaldos de Toledo (1558–1634)
