= Luis Tribaldos de Toledo =

Spanish humanist, geographer, and historian

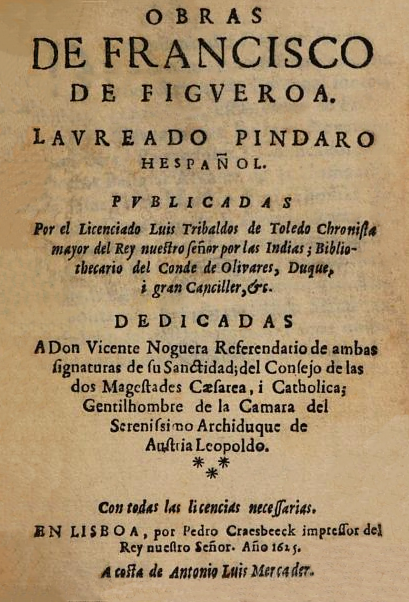
Obras de Francisco de Figueroa (Lisbon 1625) by Luis Tribaldos de Toledo.

Luis Tribaldos de Toledo (1558 in Tébar – 1634 in Madrid) was a Spanish humanist, geographer and historian.
