= Alberto Valdivia Baselli =

Peruvian writer

- Born: Lima, Peru
- Education: UNED (B.A., Licenciatura), (M.A.), (Ph.D.); Columbia University (Inter University Doctoral Consortium student); The Graduate Center of the City University of New York, (M.Phil), (Ph.D) Hispanic Philology, Philosophy, Literature, Linguistics, Latin American Literature, Latin American Studies and Culture
- Occupations: Poet, writer, researcher, university lecturer
- Writing career
- Genres: Poetry, short story, essay, academic writing
- Notable work: Los virajes del quipu
- Website: www.albertovaldiviabaselli.com

Alberto Augusto Valdivia Baselli is a Peruvian poet, writer, essayist, literary scholar, and specialist in Peruvian and Latin American Philosophy and culture.

== Life and work ==
Valdivia-Baselli studied Hispanic philology (Linguistics and Literature) at Universidad Nacional de Educación a Distancia (UNED) in Spain and a master's degree in philosophy and contemporary thought at the European Higher Education Area system through UNED. He holds a PhD in philosophy (Latin American philosophy, cultural products and political thought) from UNED (Spain). As a PhD student at the CUNY Graduate Center, he also studied at the PhD program in Iberian and Latin American Cultures at Columbia University in New York City. He holds a PhD in Latin American, Iberian and Latino Cultures from the Graduate Center of the City University of New York (CUNY).

He worked as an adjunct instructor at colleges of State University of New York, City University of New York, and as a literary scholar in the Centre for Peruvian Cultural Studies. He currently works as a lecturer at the Spanish and Portuguese Languages and Literatures Department at New York University. Previously, Valdivia-Baselli taught Language Arts and Humanities at Peruvian schools and at the University of the Pacific (Peru). During more than seven years, he was also teacher and head of the Spanish Department at the Italian Baccalaureate school Colegio Italiano Antonio Raimondi in Lima. He teaches, as Visiting Lecturer, Literature and Philosophy in the Humanities Graduate Program at the Universidad Nacional Mayor de San Marcos.

Valdivia-Baselli's research has focused on the literary and philosophical response to various aspects of Peruvian culture: political violence, socio-political topics, collective imagination, post-colonial studies, epistemology of Latin America, utopia and ideology of resistance, and gender studies. Valdivia-Baselli has published numerous essays and poems in various specialized media outlets in Peru, such as Hueso Humero, Evohe and Hydra. Some of his work has been published abroad, in Argentina, Spain, Chile, France, Germany and the United States. He has been guest professor and guest lecturer at University of Miami, Montclair State University, University of Pennsylvania, Maison de l'Amérique Latine (Paris), The Istituto Italo Lationoamericano di Roma, among others.

Valdivia-Baselli co-founded a specialized essay publication Hydra in 1999. Between 2002 and 2007 he directed the literary review Ajos & Zafiros. He co-directed the Peruvian Association for the Development of Reading (Leamos). Valdivia-Baselli is currently a member of the organizing committee of the Peruvian Center for Cultural Studies (CPEC - Centro Peruano de Estudios Culturales).

== Works ==
- La región humana [The Human Region] (BCR, 2000) (Fondo Editorial del Banco Central de Reserva del Peru, 2000), foreword by Ricardo González Vigil (Pontificia Universidad Catolica del Peru).
- Patología [Pathology] (Osis Editores, 2000; Editorial Nido de Cuervos, 2004) foreword by Julio Ortega (Brown University, USA).
- Alberto Valdivia-Baselli & Gonzalo Portals (Ed.)Sombras de vidrio: estudio y antología de la poesía escrita por mujeres 1989-2004 [Glass Shadows: A study and anthology of poetry written by women 1989-2004], in Ajos & Zafiros #6
- Quartier ascendant (Nouvelle lune) (ed. Plaine Page, Marseille, 2007), bilingual chapbook.
- Entre líneas pudicas [Between Chaste Lines] (ed. Lustra, 2008 / Colección Piedra/Sangre - Spanish International Cooperation Agency [AECID]).
- Neomenia (Ed. Trashumantes of the CPEC, 2013). Poetry (foreword by Jose Antonio Mazzotti (Tufts University, USA).)
- Los tejidos detrás (Ed. Trashumantes of the CPEC, 2013). Short stories (foreword by Julio Ortega (Brown University, USA).)
- Utopía y poder en América y España (Tecnos, España, 2016) (co-author). Moisés González y Rafael Herrera, eds. Philosophy.
- Wañuypacha/Partothötröl (Ed. Sudaquia, New York, 2017). Poetry (foreword by Marta Lopez-Luaces (Spanish poet) and Julio Ortega (Brown University, USA).) Nominated to a "Luces Prize" of El Comercio for best book of poetry 2017.
- Los virajes del quipu. Pensamiento utópico, (de)construcción de nación y resistencia en el mundo andino (Fondo Editorial de la Universidad Nacional Mayor de San Marcos, Lima, 2019). Essay (foreword by Dr. Rafael Herrera Guillén, Spanish Political Philosopher).

== Anthologies ==
Poetry

- Poesía peruana siglo XX [20th century Peruvian Poetry], Copé 1999, ed. Ricardo González Vigil
- Aldea Poética (Madrid, 1997, ed. Gloria Fuertes)
- Poesía viva del Perú, Antología de la poesía peruana contemporánea (University of Guadalajara, Jalisco, Mexico, 2005)
- En tous lieux nulle part ici, Anthologie de la Biennale Internationale des Poètes 2005 (Paris, 2006)
- Pulenta Pool. Peruvian Poets in the US (English/Spanish), Hostos Review (New York, 2017), among others.

== Sources ==
- Hofstra Hispanic Review. Issue: Vol. 2 N. 4 Spring 2007
- Galerna Issue: N. 5 2007(Literary Review)(Department of Spanish and Portuguese Literatures, Montclair University, NJ)
- Pterodactilo Issue: Vol. 3 N. 4 Fall 2005 (Literary Review)(Department of Spanish and Portuguese Literatures, University of Texas in Austin)
- Ricardo González Vigil. Poesía Peruana Siglo XX. 2 vol. Lima: Copé Ed., 1999
- Diccionario Biográfico del Perú Contemporáneo. 2 vol. Lima: Milla Batres Ed., 2004)
