= Raquel Chang-Rodriguez =

American historian

Raquel Chang-Rodriguez is an American literature historian, specializing in Hispanic literature, currently a Distinguished Professor at the Graduate Center of the City University of New York.

She is an honorary professor at National University of San Marcos and has an honorary doctorate from National and Kapodistrian University of Athens.

From 1994-2001 she cohosted the CUNY TV show Charlando con Cervantes with José Maria Conget, who was at that time the Deputy Director of Instituto Cervantes in New York.

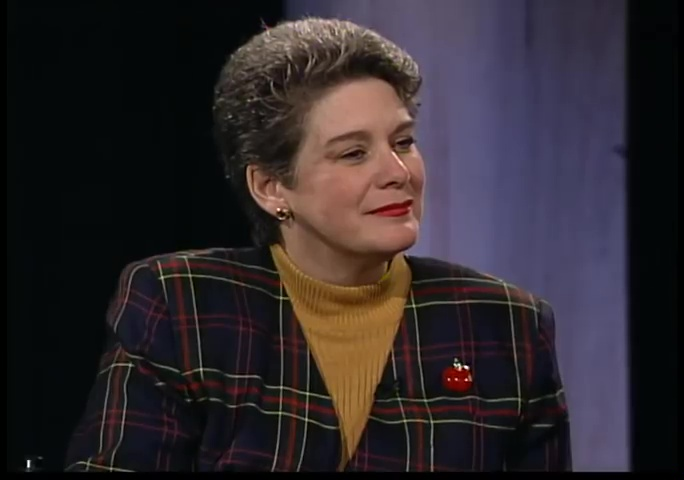
Chang-Rodriguez hosts CUNY TV's Charlando con Cervantes, 1996.

== Publications ==
Select works:

- Violencia y subversión en la prosa colonial hispanoamericana siglos XVI y XVII, 1982
- Voces de Hispanoamerica : antologia literaria, 1988
- Hidden messages : representation and resistance in Andean colonial drama, 1999
- "Aquí, ninfas del sur, venid ligeras" : voces poéticas virreinales, 2008
