= Pedro de Oña =

Chile poet (1570–1643)

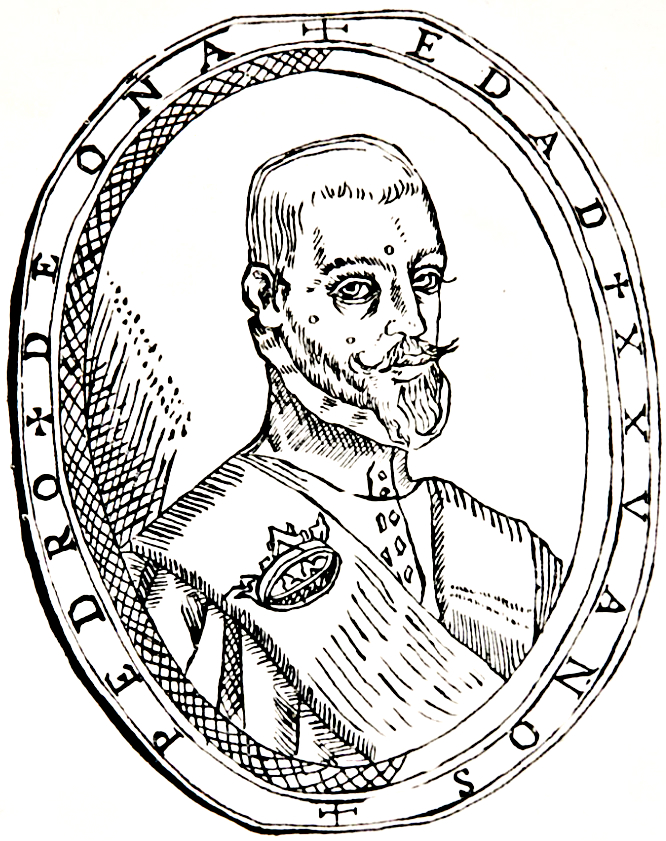
- Pedro de Oña at 25 years old.
- Born: 1570; Angol, Reyno de Chile
- Died: 1643 (aged 72–73); Lima
- Occupation: Poet

Pedro de Oña (1570–1643) is considered the first known poet born in Chile, and is best remembered for his verse epic poem Primera parte de Arauco domado (“First Part of the Araucan Conquest”). Born in Angol, he was the son of a military captain, Gregorio de Oña, who had perished during the conquest of Chile by Spain. Pedro de Oña grew up amid this ongoing conflict; he was born in what was then a small military post, in a territory largely controlled by Chile's indigenous peoples.

His mother remarried with a man of considerable influence, thus allowing Pedro de Oña to study in Lima at the Real Colegio de San Martín and later, at the Universidad de San Marcos. He received his degree from the viceroy García Hurtado de Mendoza, 5th Marquis of Cañete, and in 1596 received his bachelor's degree in Lima. He studied various baroque and classical writers, and worked at various jobs in Peru.

In 1596 he published Arauco domado. This epic poem, written in rhymed couplets, praises the military deeds of Hurtado de Mendoza. It appears that Hurtado de Mendoza, dissatisfied with how he was portrayed in La Araucana by Alonso de Ercilla y Zúñiga, commissioned a new work: De Oña’s. His models were Virgil’s Aeneid as well as Ercilla's work, although, while Ercilla praised the courage of the indigenous people, De Oña praises the courage of his patron Hurtado de Mendoza. The Arauco domado is a poem of 20 cantos that contain dramatic episodes, which include the Battle of Bío-Bío, the rebellion in Quito against the royal tax collectors, and the naval victory of the pirate Richarte Aquines (i.e. Richard Hawkins) over Don Beltrán de Castro y de la Cueva. Other cantos refer to dreams and prophecies, while some contain pastoral and erotic elements, such as the passage concerning Caupolicán and Fresia bathing in a fountain in a glade. In the poem, De Oña characterizes the Mapuches as savage and terrifying. Nevertheless, he provides information on their rites and customs, and those of other indigenous peoples.

When his patron Hurtado de Mendoza departed from Peru, the viceroy’s enemies decided to harm Pedro de Oña’s career by banning Arauco domado and denouncing the writer for various writings that the archbishop of Lima, Pedro Muñiz, considered defamatory.

De Oña also wrote the Temblor de Lima de 1609 (Lima, 1609), El Vasauro (Cuzco, 1635), and a sacred epic, the Ignacio de Cantabria (Seville, 1639). In his Apologético en favor de Don Luis de Góngora, Príncipe de los poetas lyricos de España: contra Manuel de Faria y Sousa, Cavallero portugués (1662), Juan de Espinosa Medrano refers to Pedro de Oña, among others, in his defense of Góngora.

When De Oña’s wife died, the poet was left with five children in his care and lived in poverty for the rest of his life.
