= Susan Castillo (academic) =

Susan Castillo Street, more commonly published as Susan Castillo, is an emerita professor at King's College London, where she holds the Harriet Beecher Stowe professorship in American Studies. Castillo works primarily in the field of American literature.

== Early life ==
Castillo was born and raised in Louisiana, but moved to Portugal after marrying Jose Federico Perez Castillo in 1969. She initially worked at Oporto University from 1978 to 1996. During this period she published as Susan Perez Castillo. She is fluent in Portuguese, Spanish and French, which has influenced her later work on the multilingual literatures of the Americas.

== Teaching career ==
After serving as a lecturer in English at Oporto, Castillo became Fernando Pessoa University's Vice-Principal for International Relations. Shortly afterwards, she moved to the University of Glasgow as a lecturer, shortly being promoted to Reader and then assuming the John Nichol Professorship of American Literature. At the University of Glasgow, she became the first female Head (Chair) of English Literature in 550 years (which she writes about in her poem 'Exam Questions'). Subsequently, she moved to King's College to assume the Harriet Beecher Stowe professorship.

== Writing career ==
Castillo's research interests range widely, but have always included a focus on the trauma of the colonial encounter and the margin in American writing: her first edited collections in Portugal are all concerned with questions of American identity, particularly in a multilingual context. Native American history and contemporary Native literature have always been a strong feature of her work, leading to the collection Native American Women in Literature and Culture (with Victor Da Rosa), but also informing a more general interest in understanding both sides of the colonial moment. More recently, she has produced expansive historical work that re-visions the early American context. Her co-edited anthology The Literatures of Colonial America was described as a book that may "model a new kind of early American studies that reads beyond the U.S. nation and change the field's object of study.", while her monograph American Literature in Context to 1865 raised a series or questions for one reviewer: "How can we bring scholarship that challenges the U.S.-based framing of early America into introductory texts? How can we loosen the grip that United States nationalism has on colonial America while still engaging historical frameworks? Can curriculum committees, publishers, and casual readers be convinced that early American literature should be hemispheric, multilingual, and multidisciplinary?". Her novel Casket Girls is described by Deborah Alma as "Beautifully written, enthralling and richly layered account of extraordinary times and places. Many of the episodes are based on eye-witness accounts of actual historical events. Castillo casts an unflinching eye on the horrors of slavery and the strength of women against the most terrible odds, and brings it wonderfully to life in this powerful novel."

== Poetry ==
Castillo has published seven collections of poems and describes her writing as being focused on "Nature; the wonders and the weirdness of family; sounds and accents and voices; incidents when I travel; the language of children, which is wonderfully direct and uncluttered with stale metaphors; old photographs; songs; paintings."

Her poem 'Bird of God', about the painter Joanna Boyce, won the Pre-Raphaelite Society's 2018 Poetry Competition.

Jill Munro describes The Gun-Runner's Daughter (2018) in the following: "Susan Castillo Street weaves a feisty autobiographical web of familial relationships, cottonmouths, cicadas and crabbing amongst many other varied subjects; a ‘bayou fusillade’ (The Alchemist) of images and well-hewn narratives from a Southern Gothic childhood to the present day. Be ready to be transported to Mississippi and beyond by this vivid and intriguing collection brimming with the lessons of a well-lived life."

== Marriage ==
Jonathan Street and Susan Castillo married in 2011: Street died the year after following a fall. The Guardian obituary described their life together "in an oast house near Tunbridge Wells, which they restored together. Outside work, Jonathan was a book-lover and film fanatic, particularly fond of French New Wave cinema and classic Hollywood film noir. One of the founding members of the Campaign for Real Ale, he enjoyed nothing more than sipping a pint of Harveys at his village pub and revelled in the peace and solitude of his home, where deer would wander into the garden from the nearby forest."

== Media appearances ==
- Panel member, programme on the Salem Witch Trials, In Our Time, BBC Radio 4, November 2015.
- Panel member, programme on Pocahontas, In Our Time, BBC Radio 4. November 2013

== Bibliography ==
=== Anthologies ===
- The Literatures of Colonial America: An Anthology Co-edited with Ivy Schweitzer (Oxford: Blackwell, 2001).

=== Edited collections ===
- Nineteenth-Century Southern Gothic Short Fiction: Haunted by the Dark. (co-edited with Charles L. Crow). (Anthem, 2020)
- The Palgrave Handbook of the Southern Gothic (co-edited with Charles Crow). (Palgrave, 2016)
- American Travel Writing and Empire (co-edited with David Seed). (Liverpool University Press/University of Chicago Press, 2009)
- A Companion to the Literatures of Colonial America. (Oxford: Blackwell, 2005)
- Pos-Colonialismo e Identidade. (Porto: Fernando Pessoa University Press, 1997)
- Native American Women in Literature and Culture, with Victor Da Rosa. (Porto: Fernando Pessoa University Press, 1997)
- Engendering Identities. (Porto: Fernando Pessoa University Press, 1996)

=== Monographs ===
- American Literature in Context to 1865 (Oxford: Wiley-Blackwell, 2010).
- Colonial Encounters in New World Writing, 1500-1786: Performing America (London: Routledge, 2005)
- Notes from the Periphery: Marginality in North American Literature and Culture (New York: Peter Lang Publishing, 1995).

=== Novels ===
- Casket Girls (Paper Swans Press, 2019)

=== Poetry ===
- Braiding (Kelsay Books, 2022)
- Cloak (Kelsay Books, 2020)
- The Gun-Runner's Daughter ( Kelsay Books, 2018)
- Constellations (Three Drops Press, 2016)
- Abiding Chemistry (Aldrich Press, 2015)
- The Candlewoman's Trade (Diehard Press, 2003)

=== Translations ===
- Albano Martins, With Willow Trees: A Homage to Bashô. Porto: Edições Universidade Fernando Pessoa, 1995
- The Thought of Antonio Ferreira Gomes (Porto: Antonio de Almeida Foundation, 1993)
- Twentieth-Century Tiles of Lisbon (Porto: Afrontamento, 1992)
- East Timor: Land of Hope (Porto: Porto University Press, 1992)
- José de Guimarães: A Biography (Porto: Afrontamento, 1991)
- Oporto: The Paths of Memory (Porto: Afrontamento, 1991)
- The Pottery of Estremoz (Lisbon: Limiar, 1990)

=== Editorships ===
- Editor, Journal of American Studies, 2007–2011
- Editor, American Studies in Britain (BAAS publication), 1997-2000.
- Guest editor, European Review of Native American Studies (Summer, 1997)
