= Francisco de Figueroa (poet) =

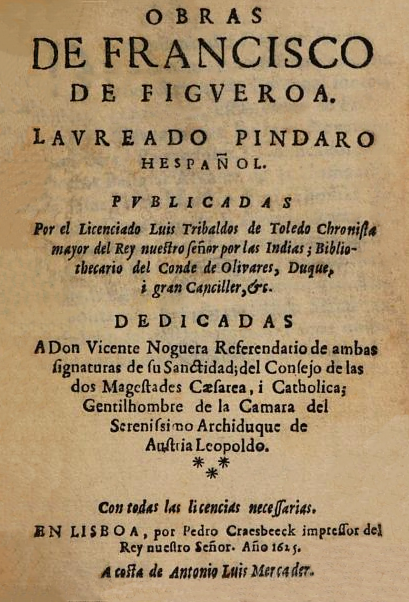
Obras de Francisco de Figueroa (Luis Tribaldos de Toledo, 1625).

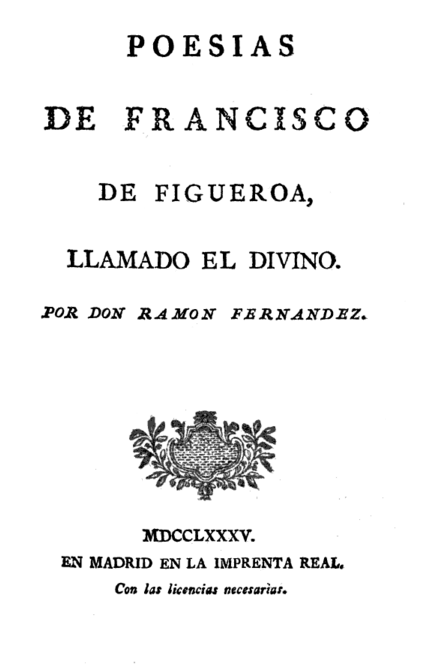
Poesías de Francisco de Figueroa (Ramón Fernández, 1785).

Francisco de Figueroa (c. 1530 – c. 1588) was a Spanish poet best known for his love sonnets and his bilingual compositions in Spanish and Italian. Born in Alcalá de Henares, Figueroa spent his early years in Alcala, studying under Spanish humanist Ambrosio Morales, and traveled to Italy at an early age (he was at in Siena in 1552).

For much of his life, Figueroa served as an aide to Spanish diplomats; for example, to the Spanish ambassador to France, Tomás Perrenot de Granvela (1559–1561); Antonio Pimentel de Herrera, 6th Count of Benavente, Viceroy of Valencia (c. 1567); and Carlos de Aragón Tagliavia, Duke of Terranova, Prínce of Castelvetrano (1578–1579).

In the late 1570s or early 1580s, Figueroa seems to have retired to Alcala. His friend Miguel de Cervantes includes him as a character in his pastoral novel La Galatea. Figueroa's works were published posthumously by Pedro Craesbeeck in Lisbon in 1625.
