= Francisco Izquierdo Ríos =

Peruvian writer and teacher

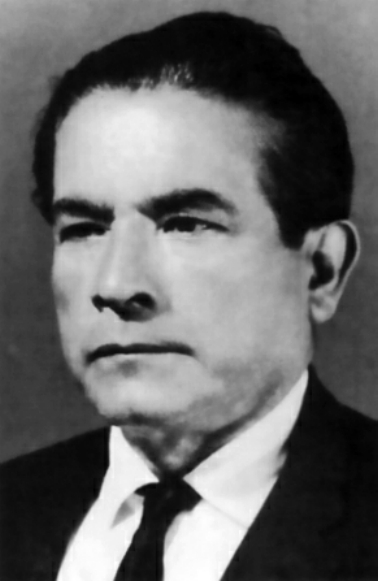
Francisco Izquierdo Ríos

Francisco Izquierdo Ríos (August 29, 1910 – June 30, 1981) was a Peruvian writer and teacher.

== About his work ==
Izquierdo Ríos was one of the most important Peruvian storytellers of the 20th century. Coming from the Peruvian Amazonia, he recreated the landscape of the region and told the stories of everyday people in his writing. His most commonly used medium was the short story. His work is known for being deceptively passionate, especially when considering how simple his writing was. In addition to short stories, he composed poetry and wrote several essays on literary criticism. Many of his works were aimed at children.

== Biography ==
Izquierdo Ríos was born in Saposoa, which is the capital of Huallaga Province in the high jungle of Peru. His parents, Francisco Izquierdo Saavedra and Silvia Rios Seijas, were indigenous peasants. He had seven brothers. One, Guillermo Izquierdo Rios, also became a writer.

After completing his secondary education at the National School of Moyobamba in 1927, he studied teaching at the National Pedagogical Institute for Boys, graduating in 1930. While attending college, he met journalist and activist José Carlos Mariátegui and collaborated with him to bring cultural education to the workers' unions of Lima and Vitarte.

After graduation, he taught in Moyobamba from 1931 to 1932, Chachapoyas from 1932 to 1939, Yurimaguas from 1939 to 1940 and Iquitos from 1941 to 1943. In 1943, he was appointed inspector of education in the province of Maynas and after completing his work, he moved to Lima as director of the Night School No. 36 in Callao, where he worked for 21 years (from 1943 to 1964).

He also served as the head of the Department of Folklore in the Ministry of Education. As part of his work, together with José María Arguedas, he published the book Peruvian Myths, Legends, and Tales in 1947.

He became head of the Publications Department of the House of Culture in 1963, where he edited the magazine Cultura y Pueblo. He was a juror for the 1977 Casa de las Américas Prize, as well as president of the National Association of Writers and Artists from 1980 to 1981.

== Works ==
=== Novels ===
- In the Land of Trees (1952).
- Días oscuros (1950 and 1966).
- Gregorillo (1957).
- The White Tree (1962, expanded in 1963) (Winner of the Ricardo Palma National Culture Promotion Award).
- Mateo Paiva, el maestro (1968).
- Belén (1971).

=== Anthologies ===
- Jungle and Other Tales (1949).
- Stories of Uncle Doroteo (1950).
- Maestros y niños (1959).
- The stories of Adán Torres (1965).
- El colibrí con cola de pavo real (1965).
- Five Poets and a Novelist (1969).
- La literatura infantil en el Perú (1969).
- Muyuna (1970).
- People and forest (1975).
- Voyá (1978).

=== Short stories ===
- Gavicho (1965).
- Sinti, el viborero (1967).

=== Poetry ===
- Sachapuyas (1936).
- Ande y selva (1939).
- Vallejo and his land (1949; and augmented in 1969 and 1972).
- Papagayo, the children's friend (1952).
- Mi aldea (1964).
