= Vicuña (surname) =

Vicuña is a surname. Notable people with the surname include:

- Benjamín Vicuña (born 1978), Chilean actor
- Benjamín Vicuña Mackenna (1831–1886), Chilean writer, journalist, historian and politician
- Carlos Vicuña Fuentes (1886–1977), Chilean writer, lawyer, teacher and politician
- Cecilia Vicuña (born 1948), Chilean poet and artist
- Eladio Vicuña Aránguiz (1911–2008), Chilean Roman Catholic prelate
- Francisco Ramón Vicuña (1775–1849), Chilean politician
- Idris Ennolandy Vicuña (born 1990), Filipino singer-songwriter, rapper, and record producer
- Juan Pablo Langlois Vicuña ( 1936 -2019), Chilean architect dedicated to the sculpture and the installations art
- Joaquín Vicuña (1786–1857), Chilean politician
- Kibu Vicuña (born 20 November 1971), Spanish professional football manager
- Laura Vicuña (1891–1904), Chilean child saint
- Leonora Vicuña (born 1952), Chilean photographer, film editor and educator
- María Alejandra Vicuña (born 1978), Ecuadorian politician
- Pedro Félix Vicuña (1805–1874), Chilean journalist
- Rosa Vicuña (1925–2010), Chilean sculptor and educator
- Soledad Fariña Vicuña (born 1943), Chilean poet
- Teresa Vicuña (1927–2019), Chilean sculptor and educator
- Vincentia Maria López y Vicuña (1847–1896), Spanish Roman Catholic saint
- Zósimo Vicuña Vidal (born 1929), Peruvian pharmacist and politician

== See also ==
- Vicuña (disambiguation)
- Vicuña family
