= Vicuña (disambiguation) =

The vicuña is a camelid native to South America.

Vicuña may also refer to:

- Vicuña wool, natural animal fiber from vicuña
- Vicuña (surname), surname
- Vicuña family, Chilean family

== Geography ==
- Vicuña, Chile, Chilean commune and city
- Vicuña, Álava, village in the Basque Country, Spain
- La Vicuña, village in Argentina
- Vicuña District, emerging mining district in Argentina and Chile
- Vicuña Mackenna, Argentina, town in Argentina
- Sierra Vicuña Mackenna, mountain range in Chile

== Technology ==
- Vicuna LLM, a large language model used in AI research
