= Fortunato Navarro =

Chilean merchant, farmer and politician (1872–1947)

Member of the Chamber of Deputies
- In office 21 May 1933 – 21 May 1937
- Constituency: 21st Departmental Grouping

Personal details
- Born: 5 April 1872 Puerto Saavedra, Chile
- Died: 11 July 1947 (aged 75) Santiago, Chile
- Party: Agrarian Party
- Spouse: Guillermina Barahona Soriano (m. 1907)
- Children: 2, including Eliana Navarro
- Relatives: Leonora Vicuña (granddaughter)
- Profession: Merchant, Farmer

Fortunato Navarro Herrera (5 April 1872 – 11 July 1947) was a Chilean merchant, farmer and politician. A member of the Agrarian Party, Navarro served as a deputy representing the 21st Departmental Grouping during the 1933–1937 legislative period.

== Biography ==
Navarro Herrera was born in Puerto Saavedra to José Mercedes Navarro Pineda and María Gregoria Herrera Burgos. He pursued his studies in Puerto Saavedra and later in Valparaíso.

He initially devoted himself to commercial activities in the import sector until 1910, after which he worked as a stockbroker, remaining in financial activities until 1924.

He later turned to agriculture, exploiting the family estate El Peral in Puerto Saavedra.

== Political career ==
A member of the Agrarian Party, Navarro Herrera was elected mayor of the Municipality of Saavedra in 1930.

In the 1932 parliamentary elections, he was elected Deputy for the 21st Departmental Grouping, corresponding to the departments of Nueva Imperial, Temuco and Villarrica, for the 1933–1937 legislative period. During his term, he served on the Standing Committee on Labour and Social Legislation and was elected Second Vice President of the Chamber of Deputies, a position he held between 10 July 1933 and 22 May 1934.

In 1938, he ran in a by-election to fill the parliamentary seat vacated by Rudecindo Ortega Mason, who had been appointed Minister of Education by President Pedro Aguirre Cerda. Navarro Herrera obtained 6,141 votes, losing to the Radical Party candidate Armando Holzapfel, who assumed office on 10 March 1939.

Beyond politics, he was a member of the Agricultural Development Society of Temuco, the Temuco Club, the Club de la Unión, and the National Society of Agriculture.

== Personal life ==
On 3 June 1907, Navarro married Guillermina Barahona Soriano, a teacher. Navarro and Barahona had two daughters including the poet and librarian Eliana Navarro.

Navarro was the father-in-law of José Miguel Vicuña, a poet, writer and librarian, and the grandfather of Ana María Vicuña, a philosopher and professor, and Leonora Vicuña, a photographer, film editor and educator.

On 11 July 1947 Navarro died in Santiago, aged 75.
