= Kena Lorenzini =

Chilean psychologist, photographer, and activist

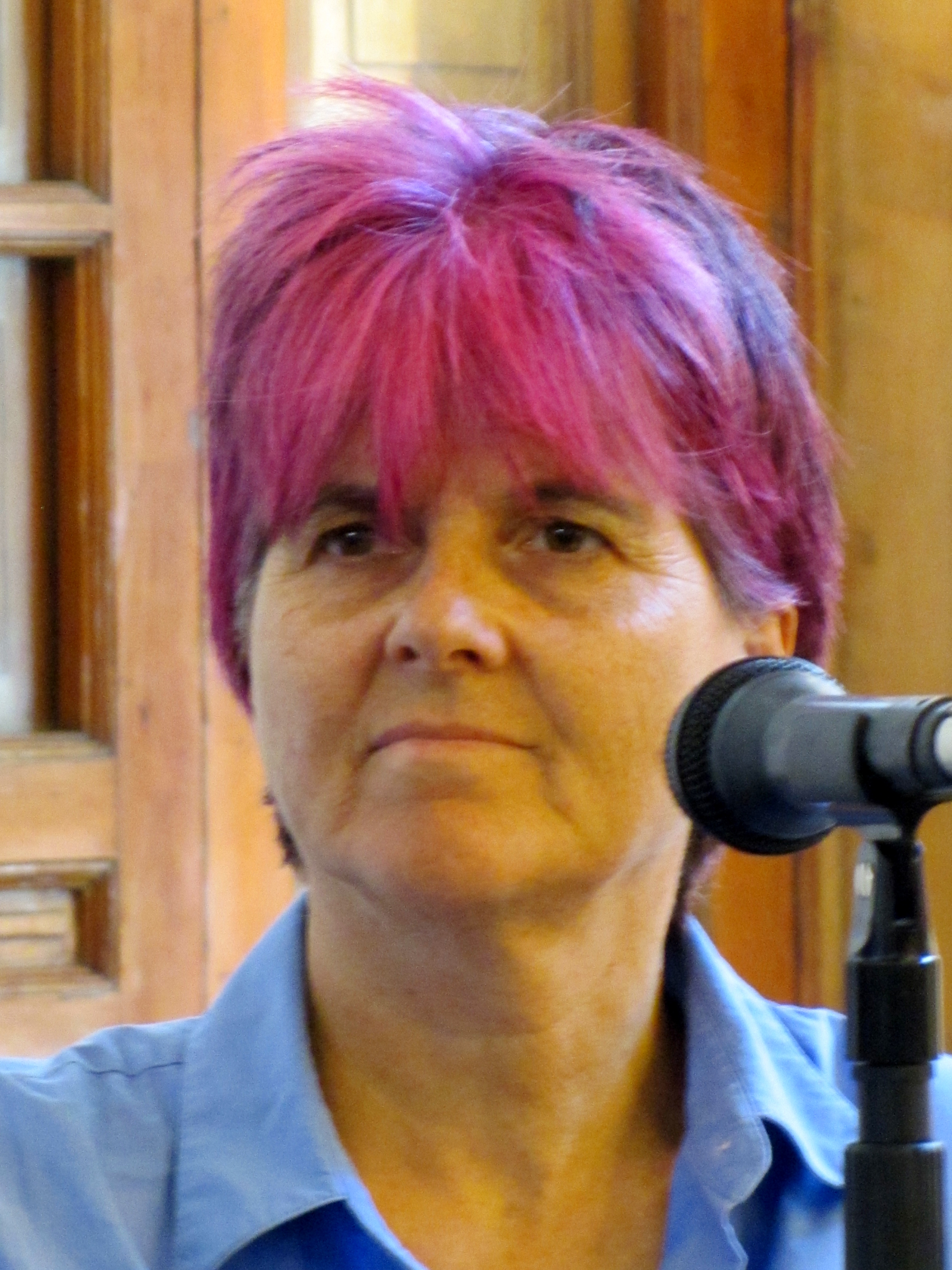
- Lorenzini at FILSA 2016
- Born: María Eugenia Lorenzini Lorenzini; 1959 (age 66–67); Talca, Chile
- Education: Academy of Christian Humanism University; Adolfo Ibáñez University
- Occupations: Psychologist, photographer, writer
- Political party: Democratic Revolution
- Awards: Altazor Award (2010)
- Website: lorenzinilorenzinikena.blogspot.com

María Eugenia Lorenzini Lorenzini (born 1959), better known as Kena Lorenzini, is a Chilean psychologist, photographer, writer, curator, feminist, and activist.

== Early life and education ==
Kena Lorenzini was born in Talca in 1959 to a Catholic and Pinochetist family. She completed secondary school at the Liceo Blanco Encalada in Talca in 1976. She earned a degree in Gender and Sexualities, Research, and Social Intervention from the Academy of Christian Humanism University and a master's in clinical psychology with a mention in psychoanalysis from Adolfo Ibáñez University.

== Career ==
Lorenzini made her debut as a self-taught photographer in 1980. Since then, her work has been published in periodicals such as the magazines Análisis, Hoy, and Pluma y Pincel, and the newspaper La Nación. She takes inspiration from urban art present in Chile from the 1970s, passing through the dictatorship of Augusto Pinochet into the reinterpretation of urban culture present in contemporary cities. Much of her photography has been devoted to documenting social protests.

In 2010, she won the Altazor Award for National Arts in the photography category for Visible/Invisible, her exhibition with Helen Hughes and Leonora Vicuña.

=== Exhibitions ===
Lorenzini has participated in several solo and group exhibitions, including CowParade Santiago (2006), Chile, geografía de niños (2000), Visible/Invisible at La Moneda Palace (2009), Historia de Chile a través de la fotografía at the National Museum of Fine Arts (2010), and Fragmentos/Memorias/Imágenes a 40 años del golpe at the Museum of Memory and Human Rights (2013).

== Politics ==
In the 2017 general election, Lorenzini stood as a Broad Front candidate for senator, receiving 4,836 votes (1.3% of the total cast). She is a member of Democratic Revolution and publicly advocates for women's rights, same-sex marriage, and LGBT rights.

== Personal life ==
Lorenzini's left-wing politics and identification as a lesbian caused conflict with her family early in life. She abandoned Catholicism at age 23.

== Works ==
- Fragmento fotográfico, arte, narración y memoria. Chile 1980–1990 (2006), ISBN 9789563104820
- Marcas crónicas: fotografías de Kena Lorenzini (2010), ISBN 9789563350111
- Parejas lésbicas: tramas del sufrimiento y emergencia de nuevos imaginarios en la subjetividad femenina (2010), ISBN 9789562605458
- Diversidad sexual: 10 años de marchas en Chile (2011), ISBN 9789563350906
- Todas íbamos a ser reinas: Michelle Bachelet (2011), ISBN 9789563350449
- Visible/invisible: Hughes/Lorenzini/Vicuña: tres fotógrafas durante la dictadura militar. Ocho Libros (2012). Montserrat Rojas Corradi, Laura González, Mario Fonseca. ISBN 9789563351095.

== Gallery ==
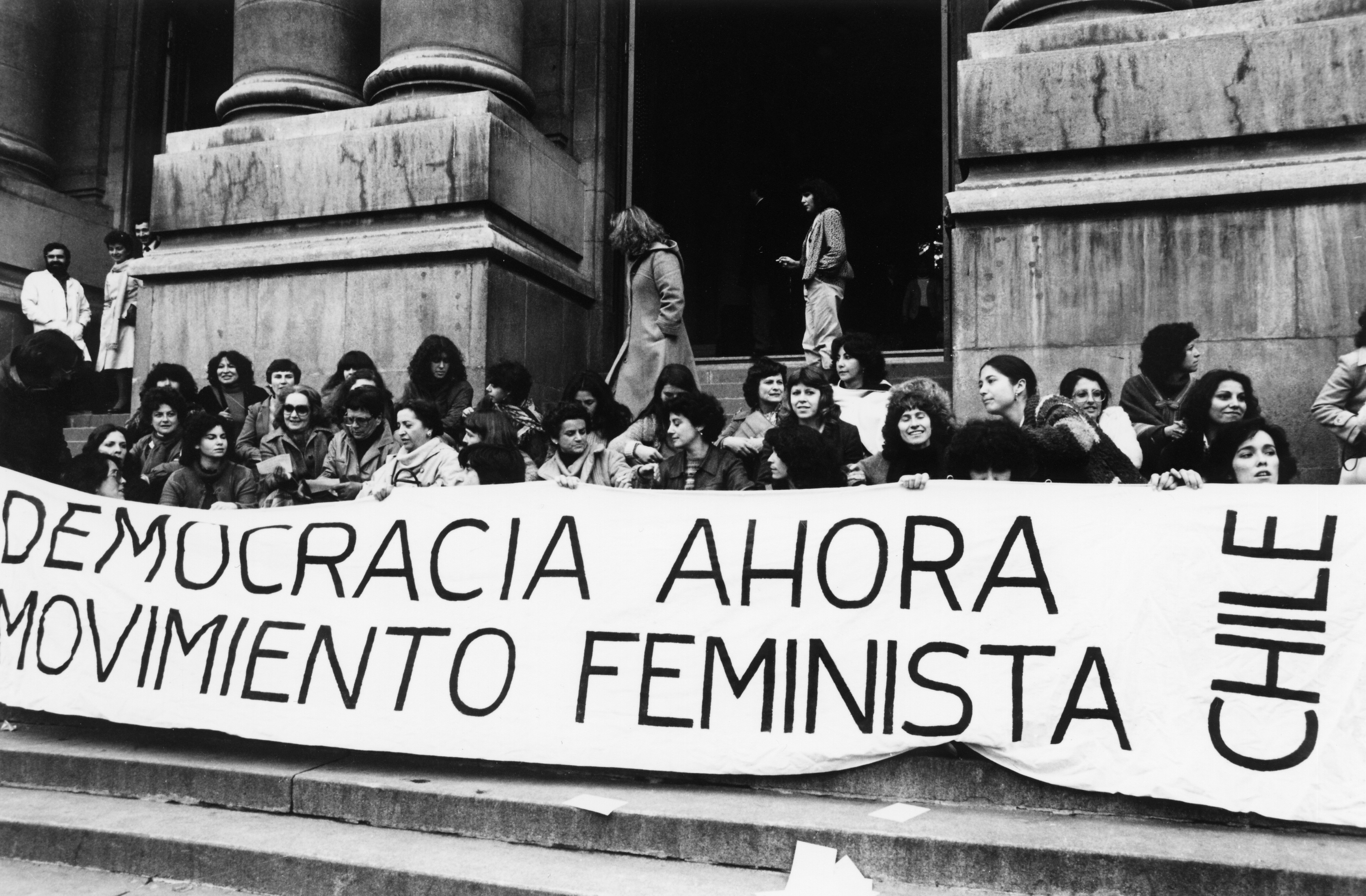
Feminists protesting during the Pinochet regime

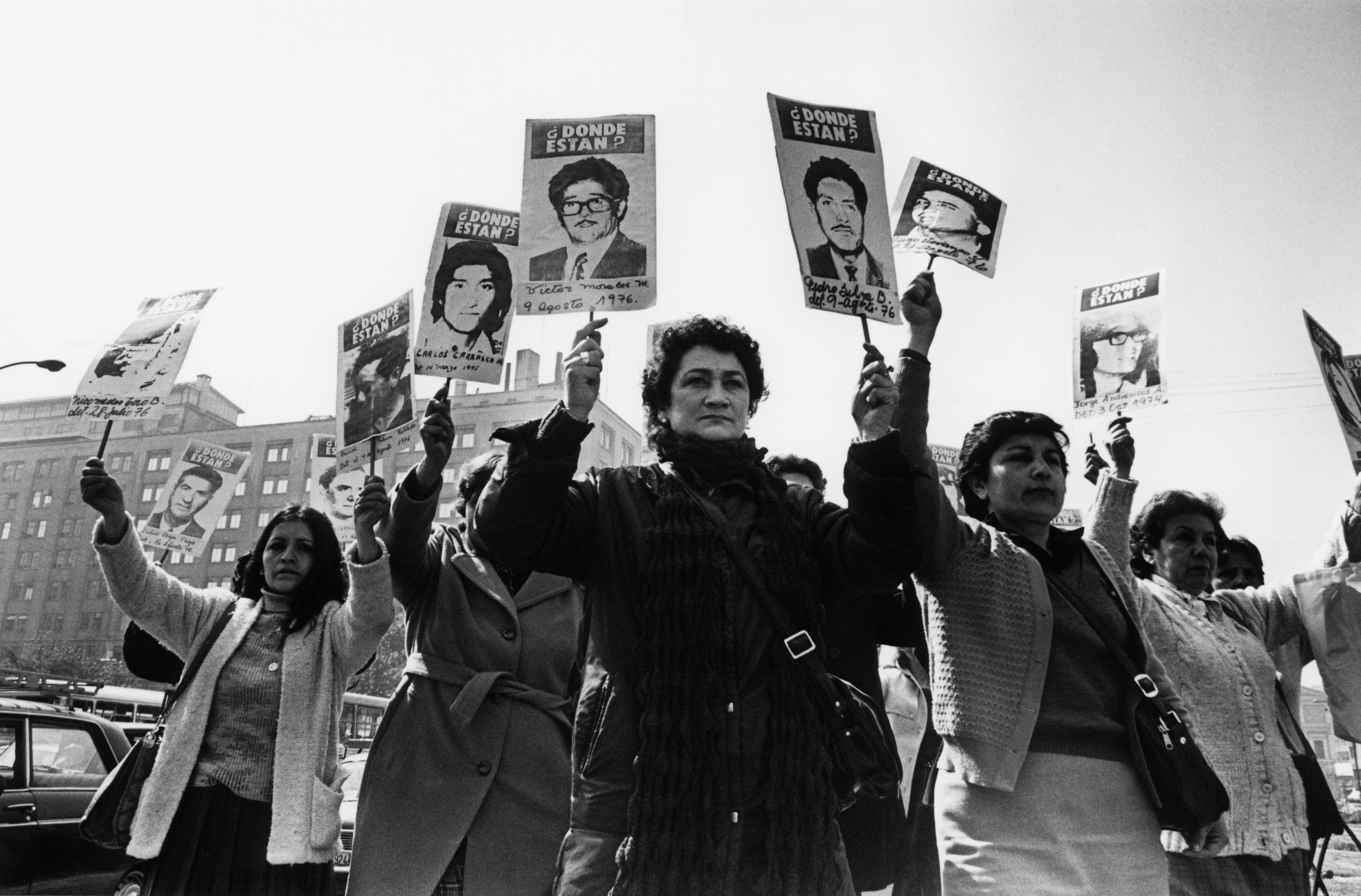
Demonstration by relatives of disappeared detainees
