= Cecilia Vicuña =

Chilean poet, artist and filmmaker

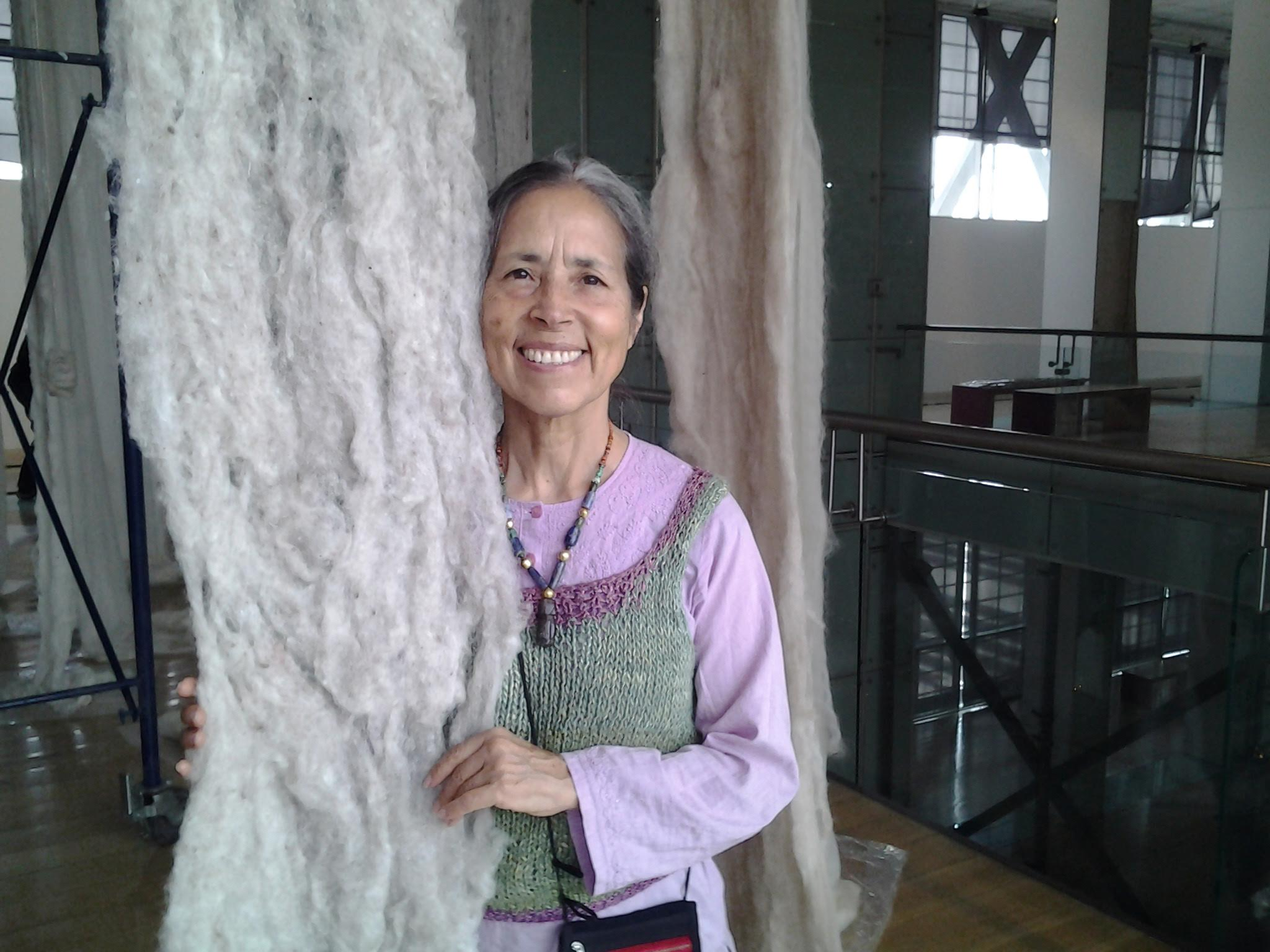
- Vicuna at Museno Nacional de Bellas Artes, Chile, in 2014
- Born: July 22, 1948 (age 78); Santiago, Chile
- Education: National School of Fine Arts at University of Chile, Slade School of Fine Arts at University College London
- Occupations: Poet, visual artist, filmmaker, activist
- Relatives: Leonora Vicuña (cousin); Rosa Vicuña (aunt); Teresa Vicuña (aunt); Eliana Navarro (aunt); Carlos Vicuña Fuentes (grandfather)
- Writing career
- Notable works: Disappeared Quipu (Brooklyn Museum, Boston Museum of Fine Arts, 2018); Palabrarmas, (Neubauer Collegium, University of Chicago, 2018); Quipu Womb (The Story of the Red Thread, Athens (2017), A Ritual Performance by the Sea (2017)
- Notable awards: National Prize for Plastic Arts (2023)
- Website: www.ceciliavicuna.com

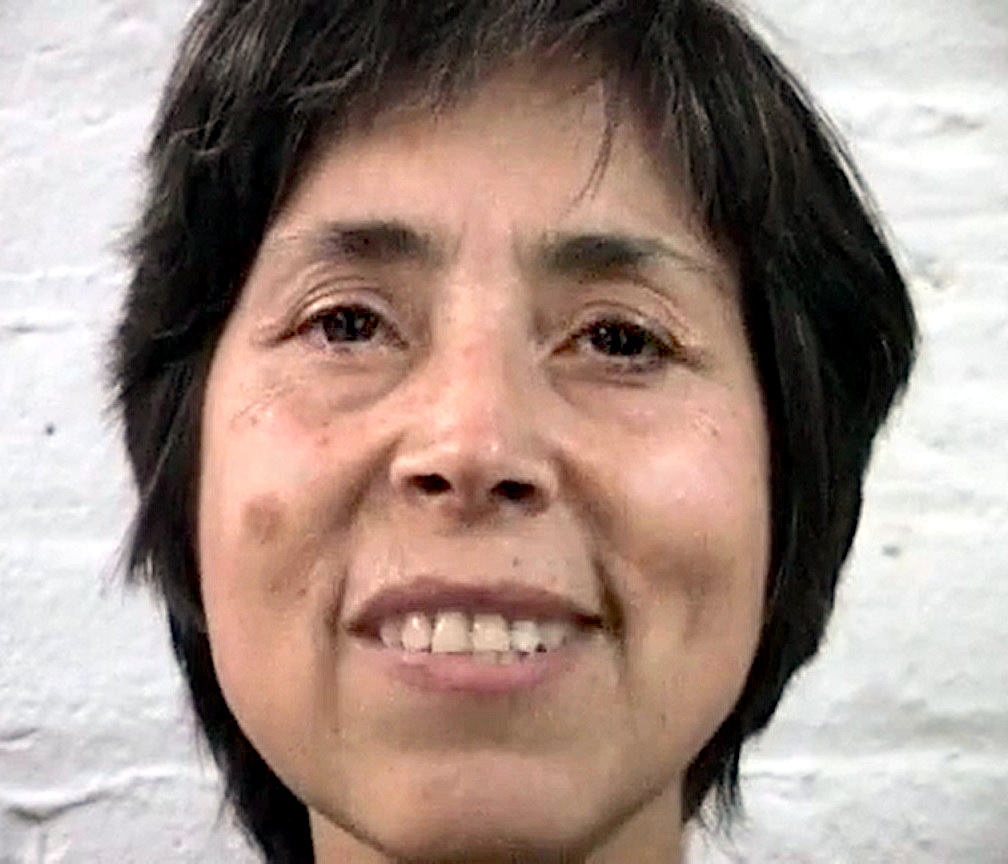
Cecilia Vicuña in Speaking Portraits c.2003

Cecilia Vicuña (born 1948) is a Chilean poet and artist based in New York and Santiago, Chile.

Her work is noted for themes of language, memory, dissolution, extinction and exile. Critics also note the relevance of her work to the politics of ecological destruction, cultural homogenization, and economic disparity, particularly the way in which such phenomena disenfranchise the already powerless. Her commitment to feminist forms and methodologies is considered to be a unifying theme across her diverse body of work, among which her fibre art quipus, knotted or unknotted strings, palabrarmas and precarios, made from natural, delicate materials, stand out. Her practice has been specifically linked to the term eco-feminism.

Cecilia Vicuña was distinguished with Premio Velázquez de Artes Plásticas 2019, Spain's most prominent art award and given out by the Spanish Ministry of Culture to an artist based in the country or from the Ibero-American Community of Nations. The jury statement said that she is receiving the award for her "outstanding work as a poet, visual artist and activist" and her "multidimensional art that interacts with the earth, written language, and weaving.". The same year she was an invited guest artist to the physics laboratory CERN.

== Early life and education ==
Cecilia Vicuña was born in Santiago de Chile in 1948 and raised in La Florida, in the Maipo valley. Vicuña is the granddaughter of Carlos Vicuña Fuentes, and the niece of José Miguel Vicuña, Rosa Vicuña, Teresa Vicuña and Eliana Navarro. Vicuña is the cousin of the photographer Leonora Vicuña.

From 1957 to 1964, she learned English at St Gabriel's English School and made large abstract paintings at her first studio built by her father in their garden. In 1966, she attended architecture school at the University of Chile in Santiago but switched to the fine arts school. In 1967 she founded the "Tribu No" and the Mexican magazine El Corno Emplumado published her first poem. Her first poem was published when she was 18.

She received her MFA from the University of Chile in 1971 and moved to London with a British Council Award in 1972 to attend the Slade School of Fine Art. In 1973 she went into exile in London following the death of President Salvador Allende and the 1973 Chilean coup d'état led by General Augusto Pinochet, she remained in London.

== Career ==
While exiled in London, Vicuña largely focused on political activism, demonstrating in peaceful protests against fascism and human rights violations in Chile and other countries. She is a founding member of Artists for Democracy and organized the Arts Festival for Democracy in Chile at the Royal College of Art in 1974.

In 1975, Vicuña left London and moved to Bogotá, Colombia to conduct independent research into indigenous art and culture. She traveled throughout the country, Venezuela and Brazil. In Bogotá she was invited by Teatro La Candelaria and Corporación Colombiana de Teatro to create stage designs. In 1980, Vicuña moved to New York City and married César Paternosto. In the 80's she exhibited her work at MoMA, the Alternative Museum, and the Center for Inter American Relations in New York. In the 1990s, Vicuña had several solo exhibitions in the United States, such as "Precarious," a solo exhibition at Exit Art, New York (1990); "El Ande Futuro," a solo exhibition at the University Art Museum, Berkeley, California (1992); and "Cloud-Net," a solo travelling exhibition at Hallwalls Contemporary Arts Center, Buffalo, NY (1998), DiverseWorks Artspace, Houston, Texas, and Art in General, New York, NY (1998).

She was interviewed for the 2010 film !Women Art Revolution.

In 2018, Vicuña became the Princeton University Art Museum's 2018 Sarah Lee Elson International Artist-in-Residence. As part of her residency, Vicuña performed with Colombian pianist Ricardo Gallo.

In 2022, The Solomon R. Guggenheim Museum hosted Vicuña's first solo exhibition in a major New York museum. At the age of 74, Cecilia Vicuña presented Spin Spin Triangulene, an exhibition which showcases a wide array of paintings that span the artists career, site-specific quipu installations and films. Vicuña's commission Brain Forest Quipu for the Turbine Hall building at Tate Modern was unveiled to the public in 2022.

In 2024, the Pérez Art Museum Miami organized the one-person exhibition of her installation Quipu Gut (2017), acquired by the museum in 2019. Quipu Gut is part of Vicuña's quipu body of work that responds to Andean native worldviews and feminist aesthetics in relation to earth work. Commissioned by and exhibited at Documenta 14, Kassel. Quipu Gut expands on Quipu Menstrual (2006) and Quipu Womb (2017).

== Performance ==
Cecilia Vicuña Vicuña was the founder of Tribu No and author of the No Manifesto, that created art actions in Santiago de Chile from 1967 to 1972.

In 1979, while living in Bogotá, Vicuña performed El Vaso de Leche (The Glass of Milk) in which she gathered an audience and spilled a glass of white paint to protest the deaths of an estimated 1,920 children due to contaminated milk. The company responsible had mixed fillers like paint into the milk to maximize their profits.

She performs her poetry internationally, frequently in conjunction with exhibitions or art installations, and documents her performances in videos and on the Vicuña audio page at Pennsound, and in the 2012 collection Spit Temple: The Selected Performances of Cecilia Vicuna which includes transcriptions, commentary, and audience commentaries.

== Publications ==
Vicuña has written and published twenty two books of her visual art installations and poetry. Her writing has been translated into several languages. These include Saboramí (1973), the first book testimony of the Military Coup in Chile, documenting the death of Salvador Allende, The Precarious/Precario (1983), Cloud Net (2000), Instan (2002) and Spit Temple (2010), a collection of her oral performances. In 1966, for one of her most experimental books, El Diario Estúpido, Vicuña wrote 7,000 words a day, recording her emotions and experiences. In 2009, she co-edited the Oxford Book of Latin American Poetry with Ernesto Livon Grosman, an anthology of 500 years of Latin American Poetry, which the Washington Post called "magisterial."

=== Poetry ===
- Saborami. Cullompton, United Kingdom: Beau Geste Press, 1973.
- Siete Poemas. Bogotá, Colombia: Ediciones Centro Colombo Americano, 1979.
- Precario/Precarious. New York, NY: Tanam Press, 1983.
- Luxumei o El Traspié de la Doctrina. Mexico City, Mexico: Los Libros del Fakir #33, Editorial Oasis, 1983.
- PALABRARmas. Buenos Aires, Argentina: Ediciones El Imaginero, 1984.
- Samara. Valle del Cauca, Colombia: Ediciones Embalaje del Museo Rayo, 1986.
- La Wik'uña. Santiago, Chile: Francisco Zegers Editor, 1990.
- Unravelling Words & the Weaving of Water. Minneapolis, MN: Graywolf Press, 1992.
- PALABRARmas/ WURWAPPINschaw. Edinburgh, Scotland: Morning Star Publications, 1994.
- La realidad es una línea. Kortrijk, Belgium: Kanaal Art Foundation, 1994.
- Word & Thread. Edinburgh, Scotland: Morning Star Publications, 1996.
- The Precarious: The Art & Poetry of Cecilia Vicuña / QUIPOem. Middletown, CT: Wesleyan University Press, 1997.
- cloud-net. New York, NY: Art in General, 1999.
- El Templo. New York, NY: Situations, 2001.
- Instan. Berkeley, CA: Kelsey St. Press, 2002.
- i tu. Buenos Aires, Argentina. Tsé-Tsé, 2004.
- Palabrarmas. Santiago, Chile: RIL Editores, 2005.
- Sabor A Mí. Santiago, Chile: Ediciones Universidad Diego Portales, 2007.
- V. Lima, Peru: tRope, 2009.
- Soy Yos: Antología, 1966-2006. Santiago, Chile: Lom Ediciones, 2011.
- Saborami. Philadelphia, PA: ChainLinks, 2011.
- Chanccani Quipu. New York, NY: Granary Books, 2012.
- Spit Temple. Brooklyn, NY: Ugly Duckling Press, 2012.
- Slow Down Fast, A Toda Raja, Berlin:Errant Bodies Press: DOORMATS8, 2019.

=== Selected essays ===
- "The Coup came to kill what I loved," in Spare Rib, #28, London 1974.
- "Para Contribuir a la Memoria," in La Bicicleta, #24, Santiago de Chile, 1982.
- "Quatro Donne in Latinoamerica," Anno V, #13, Roma, Italia, 1984.
- "The No, at the Latinoamerica Despierta Conference," Massachusetts College of Art, Boston, 1989. (Published as "Transcript of Remarks" in Being America, by Rachel Weiss, White Pine Press, New York, 1991.)
- "The Invention of Poverty," in America the Bride of the Sun, Royal Museum, Amberesm Belgium, 1992.
- "The Third Stone," in The Guardian, London, Nov. 26, 1996.
- "Poetry and string theory, a conversation with James O'Hern," Riffing on Strings, edited by Sean Miller & Shveta Verma, Scriblerus Press, 2008.
- "Organizar la ensonacion, en Artists for Democracy: El Archivo de Cecilia Vicuna," Museo de la Memoria y los Derechos Humanos, Museo National de Bellas Artes, Santiago, Chile, 2014.

=== Edited volumes ===
- Martin Adan, The Cardboard House. Minneapolis, MN: Graywolf Press (The Palabra Sur Series of Latin American Literature), 1988.
- Rosario Castellanos, The Selected Poems of Rosario Castellanos. Minneapolis, MN: Graywolf Press, 1988.
- Adolfo Bioy Casares, A Plan for Escape. Minneapolis, MN: Graywolf Press (The Palabra Sur Series of Latin American Literature), 1988.
- Vicente Huidobro, Altazor. Minneapolis, MN: Graywolf Press (The Palabra Sur Series of Latin American Literature), 1988.
- Ül: Four Mapuche Poets. Pittsburgh, PA: Latin American Review Press, 1998.
- The Oxford Book of Latin American Poetry. New York, NY: Oxford University Press, 2009.

== Visual art ==
=== Quipus ===
Vicuña has become increasingly recognized for her works featuring raw wool and other fibers, dyed crimson and suspended or draped overhead. Viewers and critics often react to the works as evocative of blood. Vicuña refers to these fiber installations as quipus, referencing the indigenous writing systems suppressed by Spanish colonizing forces. Unlike transportable pre-Columbian quipus, Vicuña's quipus are integrated into the landscape or the gallery in which they appear. Vicuña referred to her first quipu as the "quipu that remembers nothing," it was an empty cord as well as her first precario.

=== Objects ===
Vicuña creates "precarious works" characterized by her use of materials that are often fragile, worn by the elements and/or biodegradable: a return to the environment. She describes her work as a way of "hearing an ancient silence waiting to be heard." In 1966, she began creating sculptural interventions called precarios, combining ritual and assemblage using typically throw-away materials such as yarn, sticks, feathers, leaves, stones and bones. Between June 24, 1973-August 1974, she created over 400 precarios as an act of political resistance in response to General Pinochet's military coup of President Salvador Allende. This series of precarios were called A Journal of Objects for the Chilean Resistance. The 12 books of the journal are now in the collection of the Tate Gallery in London.

=== Films ===
Vicuña has an extensive filmography, having created documentaries, video poems and site specific video installations. In 1980 she made the film ¿Qué es para Usted la Poesía/ What is Poetry to you? while in Bogotá, Colombia, the work is now part of the collection of the Museum of Modern Art. In 2010 her film Kon Kon was released, it follows Vicuña to Con Con Chile where the sea is dying and an ancient tradition is being destroyed. Vicuña has had a long collaboration with American filmmaker Robert Kolodny, with whom she has created dozens of films with. Some of Vicuña and Kolodny's collaborations include La Noche de la Especies, a video animation based on a myriad of drawings and poems by Vicuña, Disappeared Quipu which appeared as the video portion of the show by the same name at the Brooklyn Museum and MFA Boston in 2018 and Death of the Pollinators which tells the story of the death of the Earth's pollinating insects and originally screened as part of Insectageddon at the High Line in New York City.

=== Installations ===
Vicuña's installations often consist of large wool strands of various colors and textures. In her Cloud-Net installation series, she utilized the wool of the sacred wild Andean vicuña animal (linked to her by name) in large-scale warp and weft weavings incorporated into rural and urban environments. This installation in particular linked Vicuña to the Feminist Art Movement's Pattern and Decoration Movement. In her solo exhibition at the Museum of Fine Arts Boston, she combined the use of these wool installations with projection technology and sound systems to create an immersive and atmospheric experience for museum visitors.

=== Paintings ===
Vicuña made numerous paintings in the late 1960s and early 1970s. Many of these paintings make reference to 16th-Century indigenous artists who included their own cultural influences within their paintings of angels and saints for the Catholic Church. In Vicuña's paintings, religious icons are replaced by personal, political, and literary figures such as Karl Marx, Lenin, Salvador Allende, Ho Chi Minh, and members of her own family. In 2018, the Solomon R. Guggenheim Museum, New York acquired the 1972 portrait of Karl Marx from her Heroes of the Revolution series.

Later, in 1981, Vicuña performed Parti si Pasión (Share – Yes – Passion) in New York, where she wrote "Parti si Pasión" in the colors of the American and Chilean flags on the road to the World Trade Center. The name of this work is a dissection of the word "participation." Vicuña calls this deconstruction of language palabrarmas, translating to "armswords." This is a combination of the Spanish word "armas" (arms, weapons) and "palabra" (words).

== Exhibitions ==
Museums that have exhibited her work include the Museo Nacional de Bellas Artes de Santiago, the Institute of Contemporary Arts (ICA), Art in General, the Whitechapel Art Gallery in London, the Whitney Museum of American Art, the University of California, Berkeley Art Museum, Pérez Art Museum Miami, MoMA, Brooklyn Museum, and the Museum of Fine Art Boston. Her work is also displayed in the Cerrillos National Center for Contemporary Art near where she grew up. Alongside her quipus, paintings, poetry, and films, there is also documentation of the work she has done with activist groups like Chile's La Tribu, Artists for Democracy in London, and the Heresies Collective.

In 2017, her work was included in both the Athens and the Kassel sites of documenta 14. In 2017, the Contemporary Arts Center New Orleans originated a traveling exhibition entitled Cecilia Vicuña: About To Happen. This exhibit was both a "lament and love letter to the sea", featuring washed up debris shaped into sculptures. In 2018 the exhibition, "Cecilia Vicuña: Disappeared Quipu," was shown at the Brooklyn Museum (May 18–November 25, 2018) as well as the Museum of Fine Arts Boston (October 20, 2018 – January 21, 2019). Combining large strands of wool to make a gigantic quipu with a four channel video projection, Vicuña explored the experience of being separated from one's own culture and language.

In 2018, her exhibition La India Contaminada, her first survey exhibition in New York, was shown at Lehmann Maupin and reviewed in Artforum. In 2019, the Institute of Contemporary Art at the University of Pennsylvania held the first major solo exhibition of Vicuña's work. Also in 2019 her first retrospective, Seehearing the Enlightened Failure was shown at Witte de With Center for Contemporary Art, Rotterdam, Netherlands.

In 2025, the Smithsonian American Art Museum displayed Cecilia Vicuña: Quipu Viscera, a work it acquired in 2023.

=== Selected solo exhibitions ===
- 1971 Cecília Vicuña: Pinturas, poemas y explicaciones, Museo Nacional de Bellas Artes, Santiago
- 1990 Cecília Vicuña: Precarious, Exit Gallery, New York
- 1992 Cecília Vicuña: El Ande Futuro, Berkeley Art Museum and Pacific Film Archive, Berkeley
- 2009 Cecília Vicuña/Water Writing: Anthological Exhibition, 1966–2009, Institute for Women & Ar, Kasset, Rutgers University, New Brunswick, NJ
- 2014 Artists for Democracy: El archivo de Cecilia Vicuña, Museo Nacional de Bellas Artes; Museo de la Memoria y los Derechos Humanos, Santiago
- 2018 Cecilia Vicuña: Disappeared Quipu, Brooklyn Museum and Museum of Fine Arts, Boston
- 2019 Seehearing the Enlightened Failure. Cecilia Vicuña, a retrospective exhibition, Witte de With Center for Contemporary Art, Rotterdam, Netherlands
- 2022 Cecília Vicuña: Spin Spin Triangulene, Solomon R. Guggenheim Museum, May 27-September 5, 2022
- 2023 Cecilia Vicuña: Brain Forest Quipu, Turbine Hall, Tate Modern, London, October 11, 2022–April 16, 2023
- 2023-2024 Cecilia Vicuña: Soñar el agua, Museo Nacional de Bellas Artes, Santiago of Chile, and MALBA, Buenos Aires
- 2024 Cecilia Vicuña: Quipu Gut, Pérez Art Museum Miami, Florida
- 2025-2026 Cecilia Vicuña: Reverse Migration, a Poetic Journey, Irish Museum of Modern Art, Dublin

=== Selected group exhibitions ===
- Pintura Instintiva Chilena, Museo Nacional de Bellas Artes, Santiago, Chile, (1972)
- The Decade Show, The New Museum, New York, NY (1990)
- Zegher and Paul Vandenbroeck, Royal Museum of Antwerp, Belgium (1992)
- Gallery, London, and the Art Gallery of Western Australia, Perth, (1996)
- Transferencia y Densidad, 100 años de Artes Visuales en Chile, Museo Nacional de Bellas Artes, Santiago, Chile (2000)
- Rayuela / Hopscotch, Fifteen Contemporary Latin American Artists, University Art Gallery, The University of Scranton, Pennsylvania, (2002)
- Multiplicación, Museo de Arte Contemporáneo, Santiago, Chile, (2006)
- WACK! Art and the Feminist Revolution, The Museum of Contemporary Art, Los Angeles, USA, (2007)
- Meeting Points 7 - MP7. Curated by "What, Who and for Whom" (WHW), traveling to Cairo, Beirut, Vienna, Madrid, (2013)
- Documenta 14 (2017)

== Awards and honors ==
- 2025 Roswitha Haftmann Prize
- 2025 Former President of Ecuador Rosalía Arteaga of the Glocal Women Foundation named Cecilia Vicuña "Woman of the Year 2025" along with other cultural figures including Nuria Morgado, Giannina Braschi, and Carmen Boullosa.[8][9]
- 2023 National Prize for Plastic Arts in Chile
- 2022 Golden Lion for Lifetime Achievement of the Biennale Arte.
- 2019 Premio Velázquez de Artes Plásticas 2019. Spanish Ministry of Culture. Spain.
- 2019 Herb Alpert Award for Visual Art. United States Artist, USA Fellow of Visual Art, United States Artists, Chicago, IL.
- 2018 Achievement Award, The Cisneros Fontanals Foundation, CIFO Princeton University Art Museum’s 2018 Sarah Lee Elson International Artist-in- Residence., Princeton, NJ.
- 2017 Invited to Documenta 14, Athens, Kassell, Spring—Summer.
- 2015 Messenger Lecturer, Cornell University.
- 2014 SLAS Spring 2014 Scholar in Residence at The Department of Humanities and Media Studies at Pratt Institute, New York.
- 2013 Runner Up 2013 PEN Award for Poetry in Translation for Spit Temple, Selected Performances of Cecilia Vicuña, edited by Rosa Alcalá.
- 2011 Sello de Excelencia, Consejo de las Artes y la Cultura de Chile The Intangible Heritage Fondart Award for her project "Tugar Tugar Salir a Buscar el Sentido Perdido", conducted in Caleu, Chile.
- 2009 Estelle Lebowitz Visiting Artist in Residence at the Mary H. Dana Women Artists Series of the Institute for Women and Art at Rutgers University, NJ.
- 2005 Phipps Chair in Contemporary Poetry, University of Denver, CO.
- 2004 MacDowell Colony Fellowship, Peterborough, NH.
- 2003 Bellagio Study Center Residency, Italy, Rockefeller Foundation.
- 2002 Hedda Sterne Foundation Residency, Springs, New York Pennies from Heaven Fund Award, Community Trust of New York, NY.
- 2001 Valparaiso Foundation Residency, Mojacar, Spain.
- 1999 The Anonymous Was A Woman Award, New York.
- 1997 The Andy Warhol Foundation Award for QUIPOem.
- 1996 The Fund for Poetry Award, New York.
- 1995 The Fund for Poetry Award, New York.
- 1995 Lee Krasner Jackson Pollock Award, New York.
- 1992 Arts International Award, Lila Wallace Reader's Digest Fund.
- 1991 Bellagio Residency, Rockefeller Foundation, Italy.
- 1988 Invited to the Art Olympiad, Seoul by the Guggenheim Museum of New York (declined).
- 1985 Human Rights Exile Award, Fund for Free Expression, New York.
- 1983 LINE II Award for Precario/Precarious, New York.
- 1972 British Council Scholarship in the United Kingdom.
