= Carlos Vicuña Fuentes =

Chilean parliamentarian and intellectual (1886–1977)

Carlos Vicuña
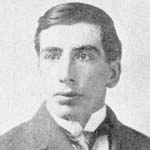

Member of the Chamber of Deputies
- In office 21 May 1933 – 21 May 1937
- Constituency: 7th Departmental Grouping

Personal details
- Born: 3 August 1886 Rengo, Chile
- Died: 29 March 1977 (aged 90) Santiago, Chile
- Party: Liberal Party; Radical Party; Social Republican Party
- Spouse: Teresa Lagarrigue Cádiz (m. 1917)
- Relations: Cecilia Vicuña (granddaughter); Leonora Vicuña (granddaughter); Eliana Navarro (daughter-in-law)
- Children: 6, including Teresa Vicuña; Rosa Vicuña
- Profession: Lawyer, writer, teacher

Carlos Vicuña Fuentes (3 August 1886 – 29 March 1977) was a Chilean writer, lawyer, teacher and politician.

He served as a deputy for the 7th Departmental Grouping (Santiago, First District) during the 1933–1937 legislative period and was a prominent intellectual figure in Chilean public life throughout the 20th century.

== Biography ==
Vicuña Fuentes was born in Rengo to José Miguel Vicuña O’Kingston and Elvira Fuentes Conti.

He studied at the Liceo de Santiago, the Instituto Nacional, and the Instituto Pedagógico of the University of Chile. He qualified as a teacher of French on 20 December 1909 and later studied law at the same university, qualifying as a lawyer on 25 September 1914. His thesis was titled La familia en la civilización occidental.

In 1910, he taught at the Night School for Workers established by the Federation of Students of Chile. He later served as a professor at the Instituto Nacional and the Instituto Pedagógico, from which he was dismissed on 5 September 1921.

Between 1926 and 1930, he worked as a teacher in Panama and Argentina, including as a professor of English in Mar del Plata. He was later reinstated at the Instituto Pedagógico, serving as its director in 1931, and went on to become dean of the Faculty of Philosophy at the University of Chile.

As a lawyer, he defended poet Pablo Neruda during periods of political persecution and, in 1975, made his final appearance before the Supreme Court in defense of his grandson, who had been detained by the DINA.

He authored numerous works spanning literature, logic, politics and social criticism, including Tratado elemental de análisis lógico de la proposición castellana (1919), En las prisiones políticas de Chile (1932), La tiranía en Chile (1938), La caída del Coronel y otros ensayos políticos (1951), El caballo político y la escatocracia occidental (1952), and Corrupción irreversible (1966).

== Political career ==
Vicuña Fuentes initially militated in the Liberal Party until 1918 and later joined the Radical Party, remaining active until 1926. In 1931, he was a founder and vice president of the Social Republican Party.

He served as a Chilean student delegate to the Second Congress of American Students in 1916 and collaborated extensively with national and foreign press outlets. In 1924, he opposed the military conspiracy that displaced constitutional authorities and later participated in the Constituent Commission of 1925, which enacted reforms such as the separation of Church and State and the transition to a presidential system.

Following political repression, he was relegated to Punta Arenas in April 1927 and deported to Argentina between 1927 and 1930.

He was elected Deputy for the 7th Departmental Grouping (Santiago, First District) for the 1933–1937 legislative period.

== Personal life ==
On 6 June 1917, Vicuña married the sculptor Teresa Lagarrigue Cádiz. Vicuña and Lagarrigue had six children, including the sculptor Teresa Vicuña, the poet José Miguel Vicuña and the sculptor Rosa Vicuña. Vicuña was the grandfather of Cecilia Vicuña, a poet and artist, and Leonora Vicuña, a photographer, film editor and educator, and the father-in-law of the poet Eliana Navarro.

On 29 March 1977 Vicuña died in Santiago, aged 90.
