= Zósimo Vicuña Vidal =

Zósimo Vicuña Vidal, also spelt Zózimo (born 1929), was a Peruvian pharmacist and politician.

In the 1980–1985 Congress of the Republic of Peru, Vicuña Vidal served as a deputy as a member of the American Popular Revolutionary Alliance (PAP).

Vicuña Vidal was national dean of the Colegio Químico Farmacéutico del Perú in the 1990s, during which time he advocated to the Peruvian government to keep pharmaceutical medicine affordable and provide access even in the most remote areas of the nation. In his later years, he continued activism to make pharmacy consultation and medicine readily available to everyone.

He has written books on medicinal plants, and co-wrote the encyclopedia of the history of medicine in Peru.
