= El Corno Emplumado =

1960s Beat poetry magazine

- Editor: Margaret Randall
- Editor: Sergio Mondragón
- Editor: Harvey Wolin
- Categories: Poetry, Beat Poetry
- Frequency: Quarterly
- Founded: 1962
- First issue: January, 1962
- Country: Mexico
- Based in: La Zona Rosa, Mexico City, Mexico
- Language: Spanish, English

El Corno Emplumado (English: The Plumed Horn) is a bilingual Beat poetry magazine that was released quarterly between the years 1962-1969. Based out of Mexico City, and published in both English and Spanish, it circulated throughout the US, Mexico, and other Latin American countries. It was launched in 1962 by the North American poet and activist Margaret Randall and her husband, Mexican journalist and poet, Sergio Mondragón. The editors’ purpose in creating the magazine was to transcend national and political boundaries—to unite writers and readers alike across North and South America in a sense of artistic community.

El Corno Emplumado featured poetry and essays created by a variety of writers from around the globe, with a special emphasis on North American and Latin American poets. It published the work of poets such as Allen Ginsberg, Homero Aridjis, Miguel Grinberg, Raquel Jodorowsky, and Gonzalo Arango. It went out of circulation in 1969 when it was shut down because the editors openly criticized the Mexican Government for the Tlatelolco Massacre.

== History ==
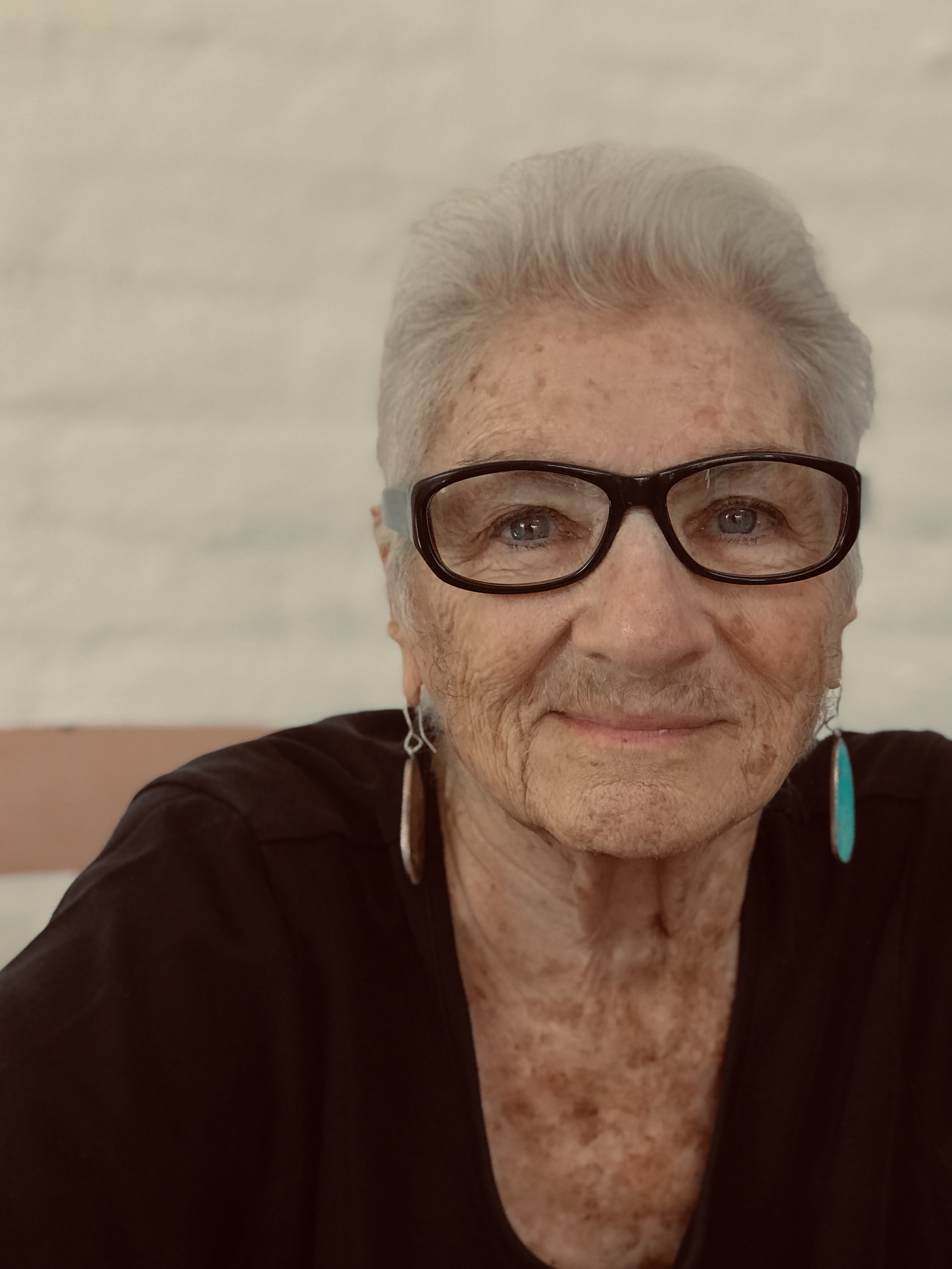
Margaret Randall, primary editor of El Corno Emplumado, pictured here in 2019

The story of El Corno Emplumado begins with the story of its editors: Margaret Randall and Sergio Mondragón. Randall was a North American beat poet. In 1961, she left her home in New York City, where she had been living and writing poetry among the Beatniks of Greenwich village, for Mexico City, to work on a variety of literary projects. It was in Mexico City that she met Sergio Mondragón, with whom she founded El Corno Emplumado. Mondragón and Randall were married shortly after starting the magazine.

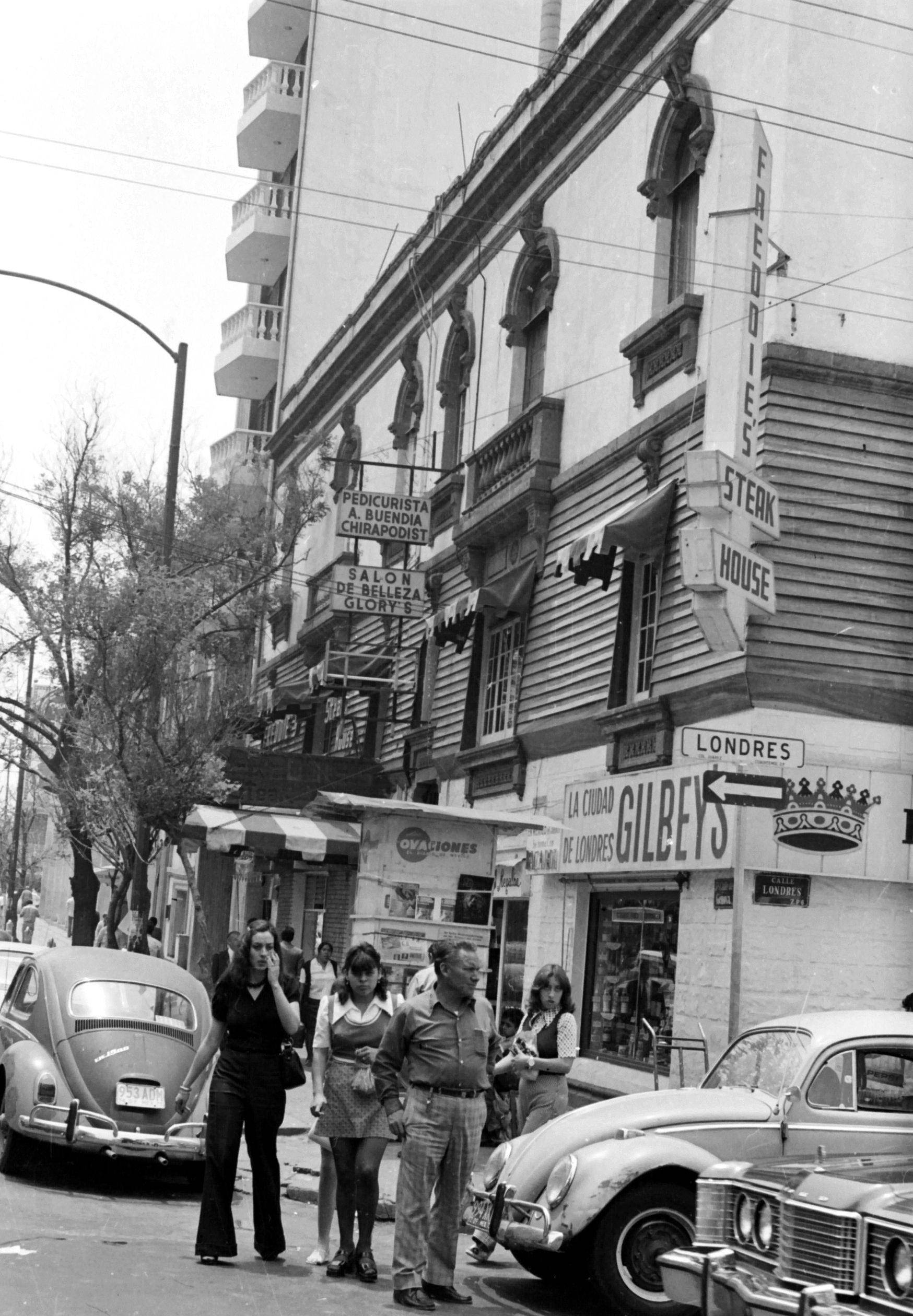
La Zona Rosa, the neighborhood out of which El Corno Emplumado was based, pictured here in 1974

The idea for the magazine was born in 1961, in poet Phillip Lamantia’s apartment in La Zona Rosa, Mexico City. Lamantia often held gatherings of friends and writers in his apartment, attended by artists whose work was later featured in El Corno Emplumado, such as Homero Aridjis, Ernesto Cardenal, and Raquel Jodorowsky. They discussed ways in which they could spread untraditional ideas and contemporary poetry across transnational barriers. They concluded that an effective way to reach a large, transcontinental audience would be to publish a bilingual poetry magazine. Randall and Mondragón decided to head the project as the editors. Initially, North American Beat poet Harvey Wolin was also an editor, but he left the project soon after the second edition was published.

They named the magazine El Corno Emplumado or The Plumed Horn as a nod to its transculturality. The word "emplumado" (“plumed” in English) is a reference to the feathered Aztec god, Quetzalcoatl, pointing toward the Latin American audience, and the word "corno" (“horn” in English) refers to the jazz horn, an instrument popular in American jazz, pointing toward the audience in the US.

The first issue was released in January 1962. The circulation of the magazine was small at first but grew with the publication of each issue. Randall and Mondragón were able to increase the circulation by collaborating with various poets from around the globe–primarily from the western hemisphere but also as far away as Australia. These diverse collaborations created a web of connections between poets who never would have met otherwise–Argentine Miguel Grinberg and Indian Malay Roychoudhury, Chilean Raquel Jodorowsky and Allen Ginsberg from the US. El Corno Emplumado became a source of international connection at a time when the divide between the United States and Latin America ran deep because of the Cold War.

However, it faced some pushback from conservatives across the Western Hemisphere. Being very iconoclastic, it differed from the Nationalist literature that was hugely popular at the time, especially in Mexico. Despite being marginalized in this way, El Corno Emplumado still had a significant global impact. It exposed North Americans to the work of their Latin American contemporaries, thereby lessening the division felt between the US and Latin America, while introducing Beat poetry to Latin America for the first time. El Corno Emplumado and the introduction of Beat poetry played a significant role in the emergence of La Onda, the vibrant 1960s Mexican counterculture movement.

After seven years of circulation, the magazine was shut down by the Mexican government. Randall had come out as supporting the 1968 Mexican Student Movement, a movement which the Mexican government was trying desperately to shut down for protesting police violence and limits on free speech. It all came to a head on October 2 when the Mexican military opened fire on protestors in the Plaza de las Tres Culturas in Mexico City, an event that came to be known as the Tlatelolco Massacre. The magazine's editors published a poem by Octavio Paz that criticized the Mexican government’s actions, and, in consequence, the magazine was cancelled. El Corno Emplumado ran from 1962-1969. Thirty-one issues were released during that period.

== Content ==
Each issue of El Corno Emplumado was about 200-250 pages in length and was divided into five sections: editorial notes, poetry, essays, letters, and reviews. The exceptions to this format were the first four October, or “end of year” issues; they were complete books by one author, published bilingually, instead of the regular mix of poetry and essays by several authors.

Randall and Mondragon’s editorials were untraditional. They were creative, often written in poetic or narrative form, following the style of the poetry and essays included in the magazine. Randall would write the editorial in English, and Mondragón would write it in Spanish. Sometimes the editorial would be a direct translation between English and Spanish, but other times the two editors would write completely different things in each language.

The main section of the magazine was devoted to poetry. The work of many different poets was included in each issue. Each poem was presented in both English and Spanish; Mondragón and Randall personally translated all the texts. The magazine featured the work of contemporary poets, including some established and others emerging. It featured writers such as Allen Ginsberg, Henry Miller, Roque Dalton, Ernesto Cardenal, Octavio Paz, George Bowering, Sergio Mondragón, Homero Aridjis, Jaime Labastida, Tomás Segovia, Miguel Grinberg, Malay Roychoudhury, Shakti Chattopadhyay, Raquel Jodorowsky, and Gonzalo Arango.

After the poetry section, each issue of El Corno Emplumado included an essay. The essays addressed various social and political themes such as pacifism and global civil rights movements.

The letters and reviews sections followed. Each issue presented letters from readers and contributors from all over the world, commenting on El Corno Emplumado and its significance to them personally, then concluded with reviews. In the reviews, the editors listed books, editorials, restaurants, shops, galleries, and libraries that they recommended. In this section they also listed their sponsors.

Illustrations were interspersed throughout the writing. Artists featured in the magazine included: Leonora Carrington, Elaine de Kooning, Milton Resnick, Mathias Goeritz, and Carlos Pellicer, among others.

== Style ==
Following a beat aesthetic, El Corno Emplumado was a countercultural magazine. It embraced themes such as iconoclasm, freedom, sexuality, spirituality, Eastern religion, narcotic use, exoticism, “the new man,” and “the new era.” These topics were immensely popular in beat literature. However, El Corno Emplumado did not have one definite style because it compiled art and poetry of many distinctive styles. While creating each edition, Randall and Mondragón avoided conforming to a single poetic style; they reached out to and included the work of many different writers who displayed distinct voices, tones, and styles in their writing. Randall and Mondragón also worked to maintain the style of the original writer while translating their work from English to Spanish or vice versa.

The magazine's art style was also quite versatile. It included illustrations, drawings, paintings, and photography from a variety of artists. The physical style of El Corno Emplumado was unique. Unlike other magazines of the time, it was not tall and skinny with glossy pages; instead, it was shorter and smaller, with matte pages, resembling a paperback book.

== Audience, agenda, and ideology ==
El Corno Emplumado began with the primary agenda of uniting the divided American continent by connecting writers and readers from across the western hemisphere. The editors planned to do so by publishing each poem and essay in both English and Spanish. This would enable them to unite a group of followers that otherwise would have been separated by a language barrier. Evidence of El Corno Emplumado's effort to unite a multicultural audience was the choice to publish the English and Spanish translations of each poem side by side in the magazine instead of publishing two separate editions, one in English and one in Spanish. It is also evident in the magazine's title, which refers to an Aztec god as well as an American instrument.

The editors of El Corno Emplumado initially aimed to remain politically uninvolved, focusing on social and spiritual issues. However, with the passage of time and the escalation of the Cold War, the magazine began to adopt a more pronounced political stance in support of leftist groups and movements. El Corno Emplumado denounced nationalism, consumerism, capitalism, inequality, racism, and institutional violence. In the editorial notes, Randall and Mondragón spoke out against oppressive regimes such as the Mexican Government which took violent action against student protestors.

The magazine sought to give a voice to the silent, such as Cuban revolutionaries and members of other Latin American government resistance groups. It hoped to increase global knowledge of the Civil Rights movement and the Vietnam war.

During its circulation life, El Corno Emplumado successfully united an international network of poets and progressive thinkers. Backed by El Corno Emplumado, poet Miguel Grinberg started El Movimiento de la Nueva Solidaridad (the New Solidarity Movement) and created La Liga Interamericana de Poetas (the Inter-American League of Poets), both dedicated to uniting poets from across the American continent and familiarising them with the work and styles of their contemporaries. And in 1964, El Corno Emplumado hosted El Primer Encuentro Americano de Poetas (the First American Poets’ Meeting), which was attended by poets from fifteen different countries. Many of these poets stayed in contact even after the magazine was discontinued.
