= Eliana Navarro =

Chilean poet (1920–2006)

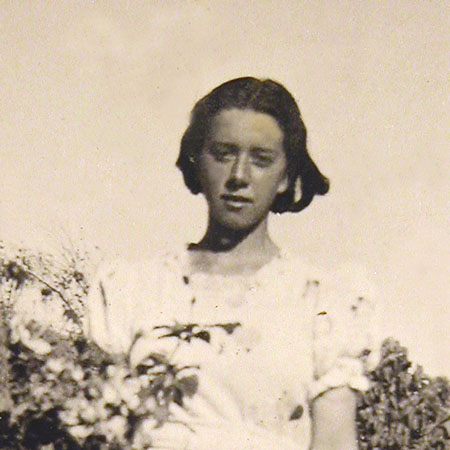
- Navarro in 1938
- Born: Eliana Navarro Barahona; 19 June 1920; Valparaíso, Chile
- Died: 5 June 2006 (aged 85); Santiago, Chile
- Education: University of Chile
- Occupation: Poet
- Spouse: José Miguel Vicuña (m. 1939)
- Children: 7, including Leonora Vicuña
- Father: Fortunato Navarro
- Relatives: Cecilia Vicuña (niece); Rosa Vicuña (sister-in-law); Teresa Vicuña (sister-in-law)
- Writing career
- Language: Spanish
- Literary movement: Generación del 50

Website
- eliananavarro.cl

Eliana Navarro Barahona (19 June 1920 – 5 June 2006) was a Chilean poet and librarian. A representative of the Generación del 50, Navarro was a member of the Fuego de Poesía.

== Early years and education ==
Eliana Navarro Barahona was born on 19 June 1920 in Valparaíso to Fortunato Navarro Herrera, a merchant, farmer and politician, and Guillermina Barahona Soriano, a teacher. In 1923, the family moved to the El Peral farm in Trovolhue, Province of Cautín (present-day Araucanía Region).

Inspired by the landscape of Cautín and influenced by the southern poet Augusto Winter, Navarro wrote, at the age of seven, "La laguna de Trovolhue", one of her earliest poems. At the age of 14, her works were published in the magazines Margarita and En Viaje. Navarro was educated at Santa Cruz de Temuco school.

Navarro studied law at the University of Chile, where she met her future husband José Miguel Vicuña.

== Career ==
In 1951, Navarro published Tres poemas (Three Poems), her first book. Four years later, she joined the Grupo Fuego de la Poesía founded by José Miguel Vicuña and Carlos René Correa. Carlos René Correa . In 1955, through Grupo Fuego de la Poesía, she published Antiguas voces llaman. The journals "Calicanto" and the "Literary Magazine of the Society of Writers of Chile " reviewed her verses in this period. She was a delegate to the PEN Club Congress in Fráncfort in 1959. In 1963, she was a delegate of the Society of Writers of Chile (SECH) to the World Congress of Women for Peace in Moscow. In 1965, Navarro's book, La ciudad que fue, was published by Editorial Universitaria and was awarded the Pedro de Oña prize.

Navarro worked for more than 40 years in the Library of the National Congress of Chile being for many years head of the Cataloging section. In 1973, with her family, she formed the theater group "Mediodía", which, under the direction of Teodoro Lowey premiered in the Votive Temple of Maipú before a crowded audience the poem with vocals for choir entitled La pasión según San Juan (The Passion According to San Juan). Published in 1980, she was awarded Eliana Navarro Prize by Academia Chilena de la Lengua. In 1981, she attended as a guest speaker the International Congress of Women's Literature in Mexico. In 1995, her book, La Flor de la Montaña, was published by Editorial Universitaria in the collection "El Polydro and El Mar". On more than one occasion, she was a candidate for the National Prize for Literature and jurist in multiple poetry contests, including the Fondo del Libro y la Lectura.

Some of her works remain unpublished. One of them is Profesión de silencio (Profession of silence), in which she tackles injustice and pain from the repression suffered during the 1973-90 military dictatorship of Chile.

== Personal life ==
In 1939, Navarro married José Miguel Vicuña, a poet, writer and librarian. Navarro and Vicuña had seven children including Ana María Vicuña, a philosopher and professor, and Leonora Vicuña, a photographer, film editor and educator. Navarro was the aunt of Cecilia Vicuña, a poet and artist, and the sister-in-law of the sculptors and educators Teresa Vicuña and Rosa Vicuña.

On 5 June 2006 Navarro died in Santiago, aged 75, from cerebral thrombosis.

== Awards ==
- Premio Pedro de Oña, 1965
- Premio de la Academia Chilena de la Lengua, 1980

== Selected works ==
- Navarro, Eliana (1951). Tres poemas.
- Navarro, Eliana (1955). Antiguas voces llaman. Santiago, Chilke: Grupo Fuego. OCLC 912679160.
- Navarro, Eliana (1965). La ciudad que fue. Santiago, Chile: Editorial Universitaria. OCLC 2684914.
- Navarro, Eliana (1981). La pasión según San Juan. Santiago, Chile: Ediciones de la Biblioteca del Congreso Nacional. OCLC 16626464.
- Navarro, Eliana (1995). La Flor de la Montaña. Santiago, Chile: Editorial Universitaria. ISBN 978-956-11-1206-3. OCLC 253942925.
- Navarro, Eliana (2008). Ángelus de Mediodía. Santiago, Chile: Editorial Universitaria. ISBN 9789561119932. OCLC 912768592.
