= Rosa Vicuña =

Chilean sculptor (1925–2010)

- Born: Rosa Vicuña Lagarrigue; 1925; Santiago, Chile
- Died: 14 August 2010 (aged 84–85); Santiago, Chile
- Education: University of Chile, 1951; Columbia University School of the Arts
- Occupations: Sculptor; educator
- Father: Carlos Vicuña Fuentes
- Relatives: Teresa Vicuña (sister); Cecilia Vicuña (niece); Leonora Vicuña (niece); Eliana Navarro (sister-in-law)
- Awards: Altazor Award, 2001

Rosa Vicuña Lagarrigue (1925 – 14 August 2010) was a Chilean sculptor and educator.

== Early life and education ==
Vicuña was born in 1925 in Santiago, to Carlos Vicuña Fuentes, a writer, lawyer, teacher, and politician, and Teresa Lagarrigue Cádiz, a sculptor. One of six children Vicuña was the younger sister of José Miguel Vicuña, a poet, writer and librarian, and Teresa Vicuña, a fellow sculptor and educator. Vicuña was the aunt of Cecilia Vicuña, a poet and artist, and Leonora Vicuña, a photographer, film editor and educator.

In 1951, Vicuña graduated from the Arts Faculty of the University of Chile. In 1953, Vicuña studied printmaking at Columbia University School of the Arts.

== Career ==
Vicuña's early work was influenced by Cycladic and Pre-Columbian art. Vicuña's is known to have been influenced by the 1941 book Art in Ancient Mexico: Selected and Photographed from the Collection of Diego Rivera' by Marie-Thérèse Pinto and Gilbert Médioni. In 1961, (Note: Also cited as 1959.) Vicuña became a professor of sculpture at the newly founded School of Fine Arts at the Pontifical Catholic University of Chile.

In 1962, Vicuña was invited by the British Council to visit sculptors' studios in London and Edinburgh. Upon returning to Chile Vicuña worked as an assistant to Paul Harris at the Pontifical Catholic University of Chile.

In 2001, Vicuña was awarded the Altazor Award.
