= Juan Pablo Langlois =

Chilean architect (1936–2019)

Personal details
- Born: 26 February 1936 Santiago, Chile
- Died: 26 November 2019 (aged 83) Santiago, Chile
- Education: Pontifical Catholic University of Valparaíso (BA); ARCIS University (BA)
- Profession: Architect

Juan Pablo Langlois Vicuña (26 September 1936−26 November 2019) was a Chilean architect dedicated to the sculpture and the installations art.

== Career ==
He studied architecture at the Pontificia Universidad Católica de Chile and at the Pontificia Universidad Católica de Valparaíso from 1952 to 1962. He was influenced by Josef Albers, one of the main exponents of Bauhaus, who taught a course in Chile for a semester. His first artistic stage was closely linked to architecture, conducting two-dimensional research around Op-art.

Later, he concentrated his artistic work on the practice of installation, leaving aside the traditional elements of art. In 1969, he made the first installation of Chilean art, entitled Soft Bodies (Spanish language word from Soft Bodies) at the National Museum of Fine Arts (MNBA) —then directed by Nemesio Antúnez— in Santiago, which consisted of «paper-filled garbage bags that, joined together, formed a 300-meter sleeve that ran through various parts of the building». He also made interventions and exhibitions such as El colchón amatorio and El Carné sentimental y el Pan.

She obtained a bachelor's degree in art from ARCIS University in 1992. In 1997, she presented her exhibition Miss at the MNBA, “«where the comic was inserted into the serious, the grotesque into the tragic, the pure into the impure, and the ugly into the beautiful», a recurring gesture in all of Langlois Vicuña's works. In 2012, a retrospective of his work was held at Matucana 100 and in 2018 his work was exhibited in the Afterwards no one will remember exhibition held at the Cindy Rucker Gallery in New York.

He died in 2019 from a cancer.
