= Vicuña, Álava =

Hamlet in Álava, Spain

Bikuña
- Concejo
- Location within Álava Location within the Basque Country Location within Spain
- Coordinates: 42°51′04″N 2°20′10″W
- Country: Spain
- Autonomous community: Basque Country
- Province: Álava
- Comarca: Llanada Alavesa
- Municipality: San Millán/Donemiliaga

Area
  - Total: 4.26 km^{2} (1.64 sq mi)
- Elevation: 655 m (2,149 ft)

Population (2023)
  - Total: 27
  - Density: 6.3/km^{2} (16/sq mi)
- Postal code: 01207

Bikuña (Spanish: Vicuña) is a hamlet and concejo in the municipality of San Millán/Donemiliaga, in Álava province, Basque Country, Spain.
