= Teresa Vicuña =

Chilean sculptor and educator (1927–2019)

- Born: Teresa Vicuña Lagarrigue; 10 April 1927; Santiago, Chile
- Died: 15 August 2019 (aged 92); Santiago, Chile
- Education: University of Chile, 1951
- Occupations: Sculptor; educator
- Father: Carlos Vicuña Fuentes
- Relatives: Rosa Vicuña (sister); Cecilia Vicuña (niece); Leonora Vicuña (niece); Eliana Navarro (sister-in-law)

Teresa Vicuña Lagarrigue (10 April 1927 – 15 August 2019) was a Chilean sculptor and educator.

== Biography ==
Vicuña was born on 10 April 1927 in Santiago to Carlos Vicuña Fuentes, a writer, lawyer, teacher, and politician, and Teresa Lagarrigue Cádiz, a sculptor.

One of six children Vicuña was the younger sister of José Miguel Vicuña, a poet, writer and librarian, and the older sister of Rosa Vicuña, a fellow sculptor and educator. Vicuña was the aunt of Cecilia Vicuña, a poet and artist, and Leonora Vicuña, a photographer, film editor and educator.

In 1951, Vicuña graduated from the Arts Faculty of the University of Chile.

Vicuña was a professor of sculpture at the Pontifical Catholic University of Chile School of Fine Arts. Vicuña's is known to have been influenced by the 1941 book Art in Ancient Mexico: Selected and Photographed from the Collection of Diego Rivera' by Marie-Thérèse Pinto and Gilbert Médioni.

On 15 August 2019 Vicuña died in Santiago, aged 92.
