= La Vicuña =

Coordinates: 27°57′S 59°59′W

- Municipality and village
- Interactive map of La Vicuña
- Country: Argentina
- Province: Chaco Province
- Time zone: UTC−3 (ART)

La Vicuña is a village and municipality in Chaco Province in northern Argentina.
