= Leonora Vicuña =

- Born: Leonora Magdalena Vicuña Navarro; 11 December 1952 (age 73); Santiago, Chile
- Education: Sorbonne University; ESRA
- Occupations: Photographer, film editor
- Parents: José Miguel Vicuña (father); Eliana Navarro (mother)
- Relatives: Cecilia Vicuña (cousin); Rosa Vicuña (aunt); Teresa Vicuña (aunt); Carlos Vicuña Fuentes (grandfather)
- Awards: Altazor Award (2010)

Leonora Magdalena Vicuña Navarro (born 11 December 1952) is a Chilean photographer, film editor and educator. Best known for monochrome and contemporary photography, she has also worked in poetry, film, and animation, and is a member of the artistic collective Grupo 8.

== Biography ==
Leonora Vicuña was born in Santiago on 11 December 1952, the daughter of writers José Miguel Vicuña and Eliana Navarro. Through her father, Vicuña is the granddaughter of Carlos Vicuña Fuentes, the niece of Rosa Vicuña and Teresa Vicuña and the cousin of Cecilia Vicuña.

She earned a degree in anthropology at the Sorbonne in the early 1970s. After returning from France, she settled in the Matta neighborhood of Santiago. She studied photography at the School of Photo Art of Chile in 1979, and audiovisual and multimedia production at the École Supérieure de Réalisation Audiovisuelle in Paris in 2000.

In 1981, she was one of the founding members of the Association of Independent Photographers (Asociación de Fotógrafos Independientes; AFI), which worked to distribute photos of urban living conditions and protests under Chile's military dictatorship. She also acted as a cultural manager, organizing meetings of young artists.

Vicuña has worked as a film editor on animated shorts, as well as features such as Alejandro Jodorowsky's 1990 film The Rainbow Thief.

From 2001 to 2006, she lived in the Araucanía Region, and taught photography and multimedia art at various universities in Temuco. In 2011, she began teaching a photography course at Alberto Hurtado University's School of Journalism.

Her work takes inspiration from the popular culture of Chile and France, from which she recalls "scenes of Santiago's bohemian life in the 1970s and 1980s, the dark and decadent world of its bars, as well as urban images of Paris".

== Exhibitions ==
Vicuña has participated in several individual and group exhibitions, including Seis Visiones, Colectiva de Fotógrafos Chilenos (1984), J'aime la France (1994), 6 Visiones (1994) and Relatos Breves (2003) at the Chilean National Museum of Fine Arts, París Flash at the Santiago Museum of Contemporary Art (1996), Bares y garzones: Un homenaje visual, exposición y CD Roms at the Chilean National History Museum (2002), Nehuen: Mapuche Power at the Museo de las Americas in Denver (2005), Quotidiens at the 14th National Salon of Photographic Art in Rabat, Morocco (2010), and Domus Aural: Leonora Vicuña y Jorge Olave at the Estación Mapocho Cultural Centre (2011).

For the 2010 salon in Rabat, Vicuña joined with photographers Alexis Díaz, Paz Errázuriz, Javier Godoy, Álvaro Hoppe, Miguel Navarro, Claudio Pérez, and Alejandro Wagner to form an artistic collective known as Grupo 8.

== Awards and recognition ==
Vicuña received FONDART recognitions in 2000–2001 and 2006–2007.

In 2003 and 2004, she received nominations for the Altazor Award for National Arts for Bares y garzones: un homenaje visual and Lecciones de cosas from the group exhibition Relatos breves, both in the photography category. In 2010, she won the Altazor in the photography category for Visible/Invisible, together with Helen Hughes and Kena Lorenzini. Two years later, she received a nomination for Domus Aural, together with Jorge Olave.
