= National Institute of Neurological Sciences =

Hospital and museum in Peru

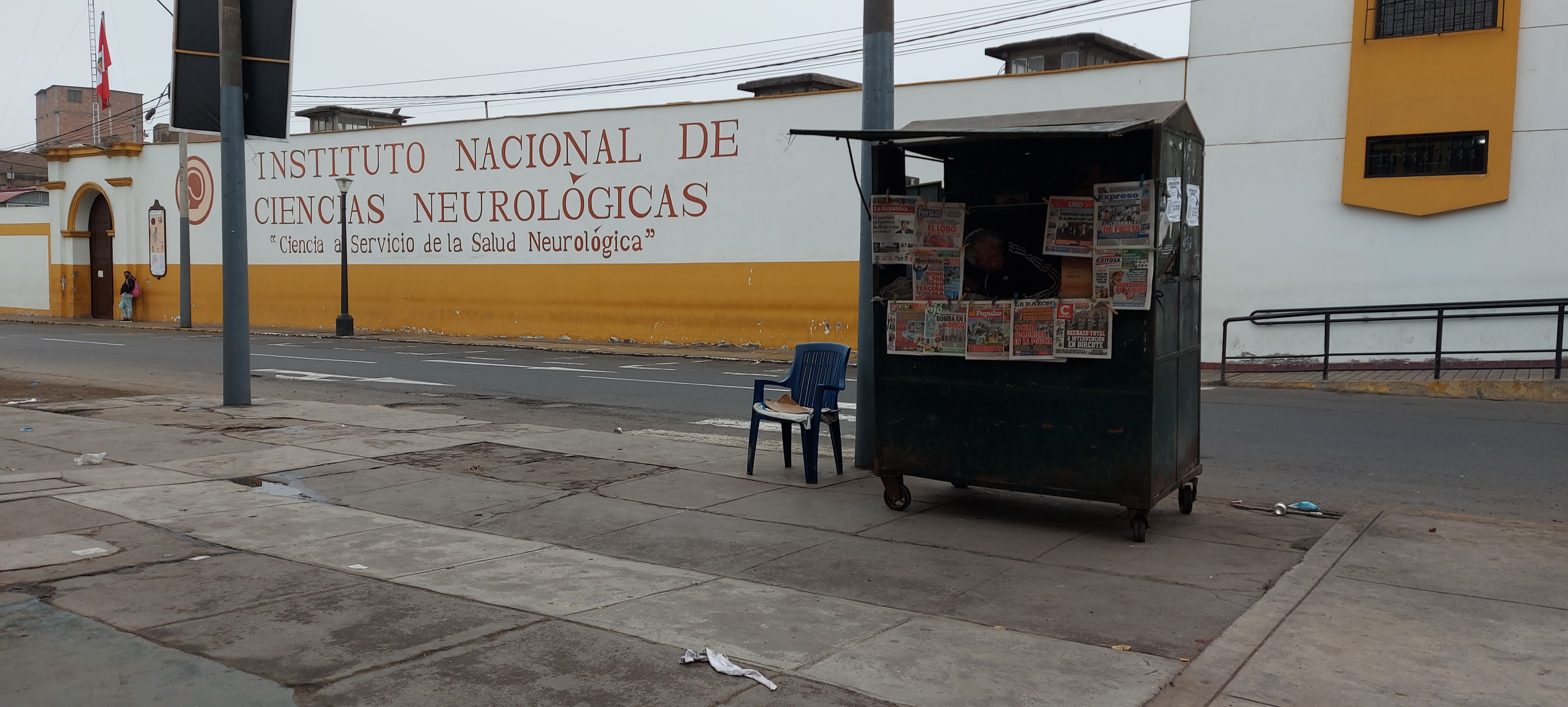
- Newsstand at the hospital's entrance

Geography
- Location: Jirón Áncash 1271

Organisation
- Type: Specialised, teaching
- Religious affiliation: Catholic
- Patron: Turibius of Mogrovejo

History
- Opened: 1669

Links
- Website: www.incn.gob.pe

The "Óscar Trelles Montes" National Institute of Neurological Sciences (Spanish: Instituto Nacional de Ciencias Neurológicas «Óscar Trelles Montes», INCN), also known by its former names Saint Turibius of Mogrovejo Hospital (Spanish: Hospital Santo Toribio de Mogrovejo) and Hospital for Incurables (Spanish: Hospital de Incurables), is a public specialised hospital centre administered by the Ministry of Health of Peru. It is dedicated to specialised care in neurology, neurosciences and neurosurgery; and is also dedicated to research and teaching. Founded in the viceregal era with a Royal Decree of August 26, 1700, as the Refuge for Incurables (Spanish: Refugio de Incurables) on Maravillas Street. It is located in the neighbourhood of Barrios Altos, part of Lima District.

The Museum of Neuropathologies (Spanish: Museo de Neuropatologías), also known simply as the Museum of the Brain (Spanish: Museo del Cerebro), is housed inside the hospital.

== History ==
The hospital was established under the Viceroyalty of Peru as the Refuge for Incurables by Friar José de Figueroa, well known for his treatment of the ill, in what was then known as Maravillas Street. It was officialised with the Royal Decree of August 26, 1700. The date was chosen as the hospital's anniversary in 1993. Its name came due to the public that was attended there: beggars, cripples, orphans and abandoned people. This was the nature of the hospitals at the time, as some were divided by the caste system (San Andrés for the Spanish, Santa Ana for the Indians and San Bartolomé for freed slaves); others were divided by occupation, such as the Espíritu Santo in Montserrat, founded in 1573 and dedicated to those involved in the Peruvian Navy; and others were divided by the public they attended.

The terrain where the so-called "cloister hospital" was built had originally belonged to the Novitiate of the College of San Antonio, belonging to the Company of Jesus. It was administered by the Bethlehemite Brothers during its early years. The earthquake of 1746 partially destroyed the hospital, which was reconstructed to accommodate its increasing number of patients. However, it was only after the Viceroy Count of Superunda's efforts that the hospital was properly rebuilt under his personal supervision. In 1804, Viceroy Avilés created a women's pavilion.

In 1862, a supreme decree transferred ownership of the establishment to the Charity of Lima, whose directory renamed it to the Saint Turibius of Mogrovejo Hospital on November 29, 1937. After 113 years, the ownership of the hospital was again transferred, this time to the Ministry of Health, who renamed the hospital to its current name on April 30, 1981.

== Museum ==
Museum of Neuropathologies
- Museo de Neuropatologías
- Established: 1997
- Website: INCN Website

The Museum of Neuropathologies (Spanish: Museo de Neuropatologías), also known simply as the Museum of the Brain (Spanish: Museo del Cerebro), is the museum housed inside the hospital. It houses a large collection of organs and is focused mostly on the human brain. It closed due to the COVID-19 pandemic in the country until its reopening in 2023.

== See also ==
- Barrios Altos
- Church of the Holy Christ of Wonders
