= Archbishop Loayza National Hospital =

Hospital in Peru

Coordinates: 12.049831°S 77.043139°W

Archbishop Loayza Hospital
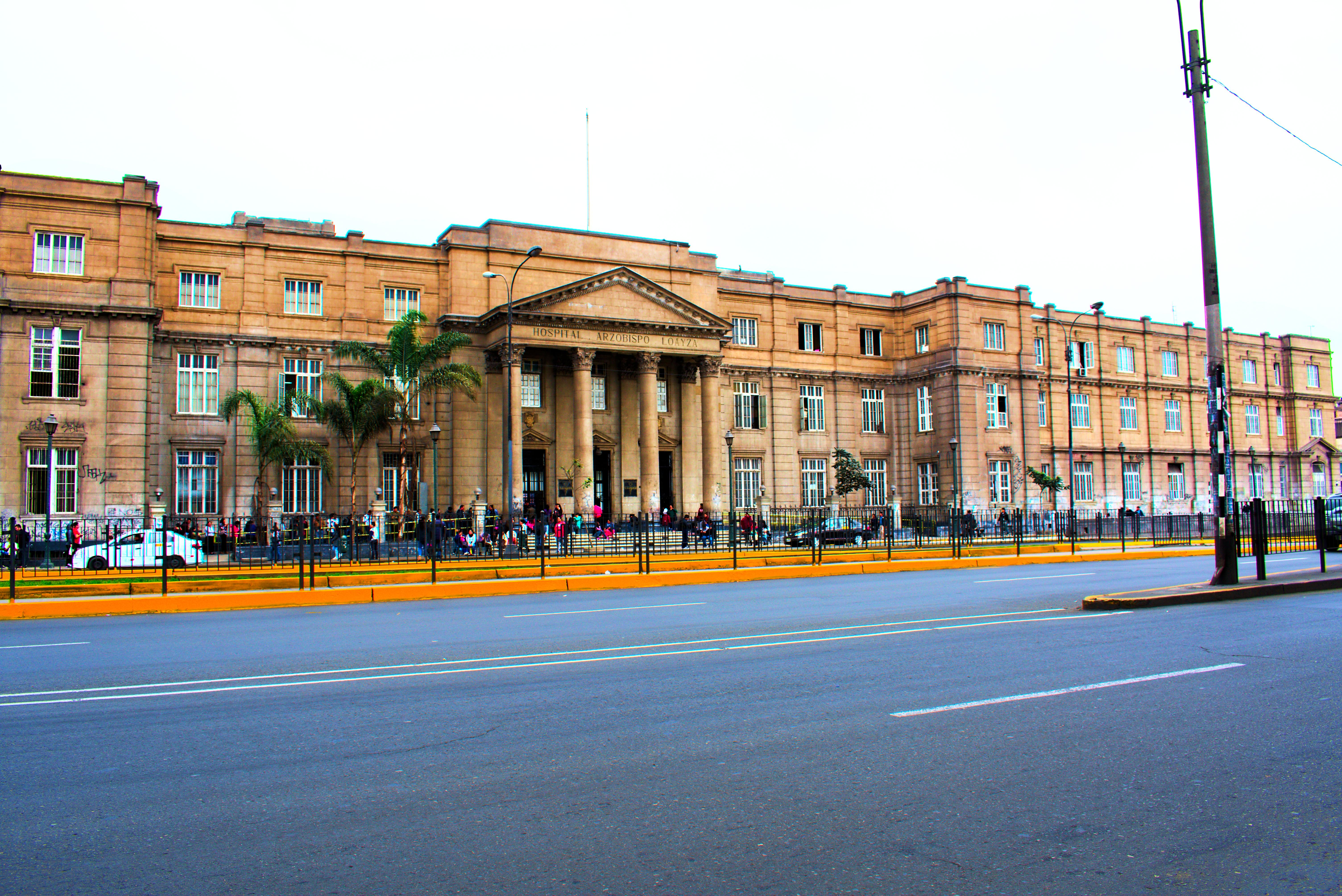

Geography
- Location: Av. Alfonso Ugarte 848, Lima, Peru

Organisation
- Funding: MINSA
- Type: Category III-1
- Religious affiliation: Catholic

History
- Former name: Hospital de Santa Ana
- Construction started: May 25, 1915
- Opened: December 11, 1924

Links
- Website: Gob.pe

Archbishop Loayza National Hospital (Spanish: Hospital Nacional Arzobispo Loayza, HNAL) is a public hospital located in Lima, Peru. It is administered by the Ministry of Health. It was founded by the first archbishop of Peru, Gerónimo de Loayza in 1549 as Saint Anne's Hospital (Spanish: Hospital de Santa Ana), which provided health services to the indigenous population and poor women. At the beginning of the 20th century, the Charity of Lima began the construction of its current premises on Alfonso Ugarte Avenue.

== History ==
=== Background ===
The most distant predecessor of the current Loayza Hospital is the Hospital Santa Ana de los Naturales or Nuestra Señora de Santa Ana, the oldest hospital in Lima. This was founded in 1549 by the first archbishop of Peru and America, Jerónimo de Loayza. At that time it was located in the small square of the same name, adjacent to the parish church of Santa Ana, in the city of Lima, capital of the Viceroyalty of Peru (currently along Jirón Antonio Miró Quesada, in the Cercado de Lima).

Like the hospitals of San Andrés, San Bartolomé and the Refugio de Incurables, this colonial hospital was of the cloister type. Its purpose was to provide care to poor people of both sexes, mostly indigenous people affected by diseases brought by the Spanish during the conquest. From its beginnings, the hospital also cared for enslaved African blacks. Archbishop Loayza himself died in 1575 in a small room in the hospital and was buried in the patio of the premises, until his remains were later transferred to the crypt of the Cathedral of Lima. The brotherhoods of mercy and charity were in charge of its administration, founded in 1559 following a plague epidemic that devastated the country. In 1732 the hospital came to be administered by the Bethlemites.

Once the Republic of Peru was established, the Santa Ana hospital became a military hospital, by decree of Simón Bolívar (1824), who confirmed a decree in the same sense given by José de San Martín. During the government of Andrés de Santa Cruz it ceased to have that function (1836).

In 1841, under the second government of Agustín Gamarra, the hospital became dedicated to the exclusive care of women of low economic resources. This occurred as a result of the closure of the Women's Hospital of Santa María de la Caridad, where the Lima Maternity House had operated since 1830, whose patients were transferred to the Santa Ana hospital.

The hospital housed the Lima Maternity Hospital from 1841 to 1857, and from 1881 to 1925. Constantino T. Carvallo, a doctor from the University of San Marcos, enabled an area of the hospital as a surgical room for gynecological teaching. This room, known as the Las Mercedes Room, was the first modern operating room in Peru. In this, modern surgical techniques were applied, with emphasis on sterilization methods and surgical asepsis. On August 17, 1898, Carvallo taught the first gynecology class taught in Peru at the Santa Ana hospital.

Already considered a historical relic, the Santa Ana Hospital operated until 1925, when it was closed, being replaced by a more modern hospital built on Alfonso Ugarte Avenue. On part of the extensive land occupied by the old Santa Ana Hospital, the Lima Maternity Building, currently the National Maternal Perinatal Institute, was later built.

=== Current building ===
The Santa Ana Hospital was run by the Charity of Lima. In 1902, because its facilities were deteriorating, so the construction of a modern hospital was decided as its replacement, to be built on land owned by the organisation located on Alfonso Ugarte Avenue, near Plaza Dos de Mayo, in the historic centre of Lima. The Supreme Resolution that approved its construction was given on January 27, 1905, under the first government of José Pardo y Barreda. For this purpose, an executive committee of social and hospital assistance was established, chaired by the doctor and philanthropist Augusto Pérez Araníbar, the true promoter of the work. In 1912, the French architect Claude Sahut was commissioned to design the new building, and the project won the gold medal at the International Hygiene Exhibition. For economic reasons, only the perimeter wall and some foundations could be built from this design.

The construction of the hospital began on May 25, 1915, under the first government of Óscar R. Benavides, who laid the first stone. At that time, the site was the limit of the city, on the route of the former Walls of Lima, demolished in 1871. It was inaugurated after a significant delay on December 11, 1924, under the government of Augusto B. Leguía, being baptized with the name of the Arzobispo Loayza Women's Hospital, in honor of its colonial founder. All staff and equipment from the old Santa Ana hospital were transferred to the new headquarters. The administration was left to the Daughters of Charity of Saint Vincent de Paul. Its first administrative superior was Sister Rosa Larrabure, who carried out important social work; She was also the first director of the National School of Nursing. The first medical director of the hospital was the surgeon Juvenal Denegri.

Like its predecessor, the Arzobispo Loayza Hospital continued to provide preferential care to women with low economic resources, until the mid-1990s, when it began to serve patients of both sexes. On January 31, 1974, it became dependent on the Ministry of Health. Its services cover a wide range of specialties.

== See also ==
- List of hospitals in Peru
- Plaza Italia, Lima
