= Church of Santa Ana (Lima) =

Church and former archaeological site in Lima, Peru

Coordinates: 12.0516°S 77.0226°W

Church of Saint Anne
- Iglesia de Santa Ana
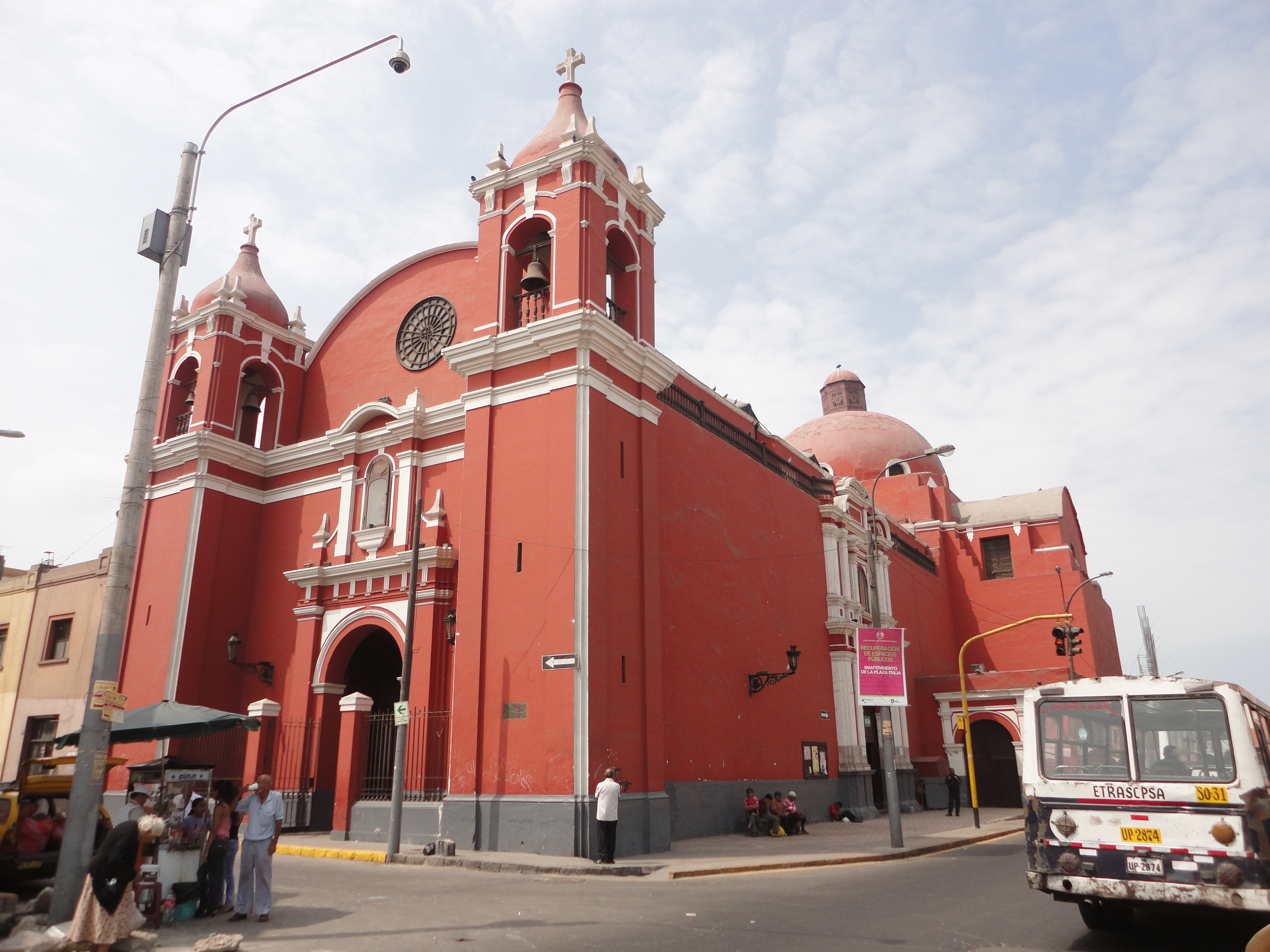

Religion
- Affiliation: Catholic
- Governing body: Archdiocese of Lima

Location
- Location: Plaza Italia, Lima
- Interactive map of Church of Saint Anne

Architecture
- Style: Neoclassical
- Completed: 1665

The Church of Saint Anne (Spanish: Iglesia de Santa Ana) is a Catholic church that forms part of the historic centre of Lima, Peru. It is located in Barrios Altos, next to Italy Square, and is one of two main candidates for the location of Rímac, the Indian oracle that gave the local river—and thus the city—its name. For this reason, the site receives the name of Huaca de Santa Ana (alternatively, Huaca Principal or Huaca Grande).

== History ==
The area where the church and square are located is one of two main candidates for the location of Rímac, the valley's local oracle that gave the river its name, the other being the Limatambo area (near the intersection of Javier Prado and Paseo de la República avenues), with the Melitón Carvajal School pointed as the possible location of the main temple. The host Gonzalo Torres del Pino in his show A la vuelta de la esquina said that, despite the number of churches and the former names of a number of streets possibly indicate that the oracle was located in the surroundings of the square, no archaeological works have taken place in the area other than a survey of the Royal Hospital of Saint Andrew.

When built, the church's jurisdiction was that of almost the entirety of Barrios Altos. The adjacent square was named after the church until 1910, when a monument dedicated to Antonio Raimondi was inaugurated.

The church was originally part of the Indian hospital of the same name, built in 1548, and the oldest in the city. The complex was built on the orders of Jerónimo de Loayza, first archbishop of Lima. Loayza himself died in 1575 in a small room in the hospital and was buried in the patio of the premises, until his remains were later transferred to the crypt of the Cathedral of Lima.

The hospital operated until 1925, when it was closed, being replaced by a more modern hospital built on Alfonso Ugarte Avenue. On part of the extensive land occupied by the old hospital, the Lima Maternity Building, currently the National Maternal Perinatal Institute, was later built.

In January 1999, crypts were found at the church with hundreds of human remains. In 2018, part of the church's cornice collapsed prior to that year's Holy Week celebrations.

== See also ==
- Archbishop Loayza National Hospital
- Barrios Altos
