= Cinco esquinas (Lima) =

Landmark in Lima, Peru

- Interactive map of Cinco esquinas
- Part of: Historic Centre of Lima
- Location: Barrios Altos, Lima
- Coordinates: 12°03′08″S 77°00′51″W
- Major junctions: Jirón Junín, Jirón Santa Rosa, Jirón Huari

Cinco esquinas (Spanish for Five corners) is an area of the neighbourhood of Barrios Altos in Lima, Peru. It is located on block 14 of Jirón Junín, where both Jirón Santa Rosa and Jirón Huari also converge, forming five corners. It was declared Cultural heritage of Peru as part of the historic centre of Lima.

== History ==
In the 19th century, it was a place where Lima's bohemians gathered. Near the intersection of streets, on Prado Street, the Peruvian waltz composer Felipe Pinglo was born. In the middle of the 20th century, it became a refuge for criminals, such as the infamous Luis D'unian Dulanto.

Mario Vargas Llosa was inspired by the neighbourhood for his novel of the same name.
