= Plaza Italia =

Plaza Italia may refer to:

- Plaza Italia, Buenos Aires, a small park in Buenos Aires, Argentina
- Plaza Baquedano aka Plaza Italia, a major landmark in Santiago, Chile
- Plaza Italia, Asunción, a square in Asunción, Paraguay
- Plaza Italia, Caracas, a square in Caracas, Venezuela
- Plaza Italia, Lima, a square in Lima, Peru
