= San Bartolomé National Hospital =

Hospital in Peru

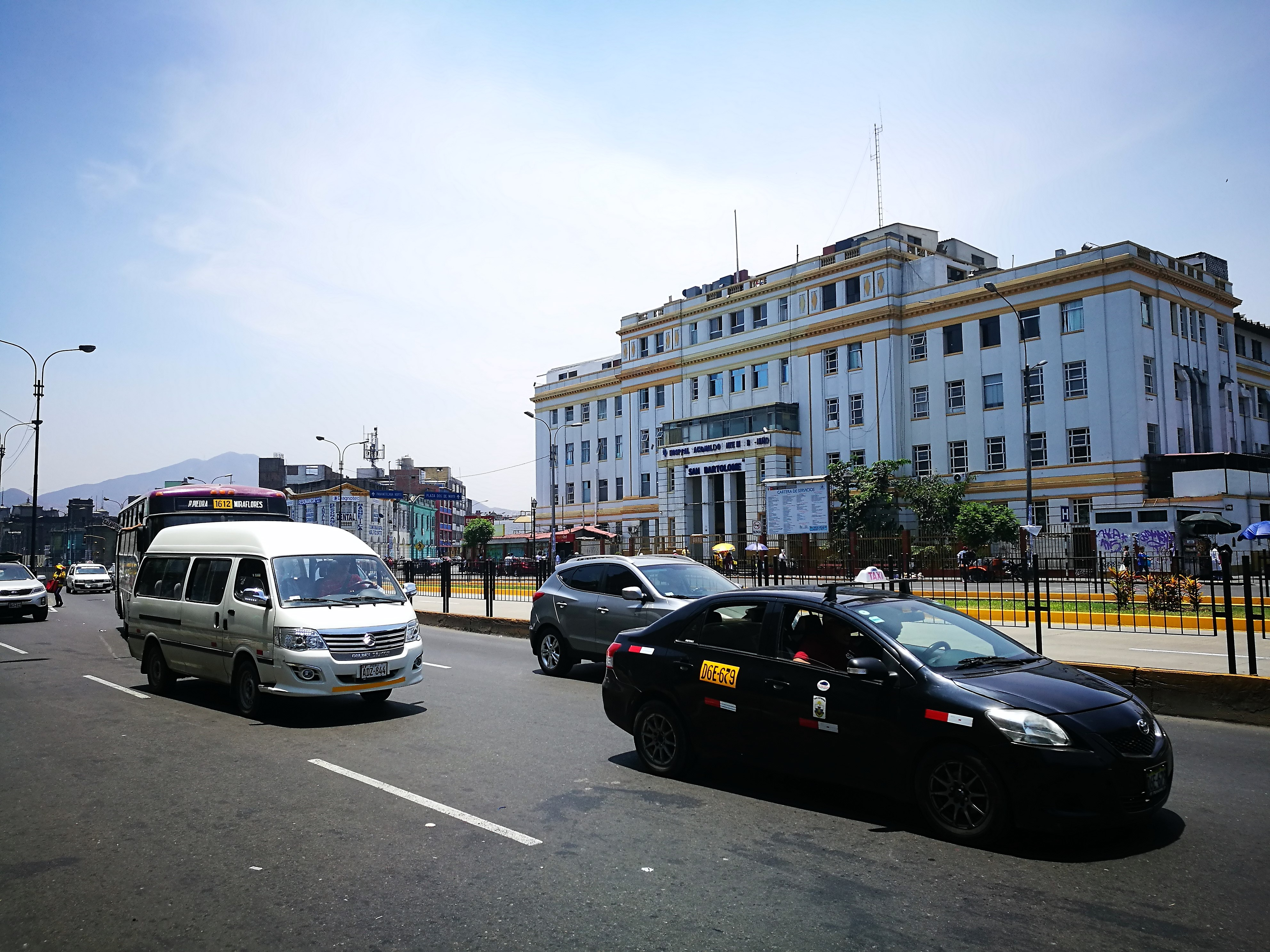

Geography
- Location: Avenida Alfonso Ugarte 825, Lima, Peru
- Coordinates: 12.0498°S 77.042°W

Organisation
- Type: Teaching hospital
- Religious affiliation: Catholic

Services
- Beds: 187 (2018)

History
- Opened: 1651 (Barrios Altos)

Links
- Website: Government site

San Bartolomé Mother–Child National Teaching Hospital (Spanish: Hospital Nacional Docente Madre Niño San Bartolomé, HNDMNSB) is a public teaching hospital that specialises in pediatric and maternal care located in Alfonso Ugarte Avenue, in front of Archbishop Loayza National Hospital, in Lima, Peru. It is administered by the Ministry of Health (MINSA).

It was founded during the viceregal era, to care for freed blacks. Originally, its headquarters were in the current block 9 of the jirón Miró Quesada, in Barrios Altos. With the establishment of the Republic, it became a military hospital. In 1961 it was transformed into a maternal and children's hospital. In 1988 it moved to the location it currently occupies, on the eighth block of Alfonso Ugarte Avenue. In addition to its care function focused on mother and child, it is dedicated to teaching and research.

== History ==
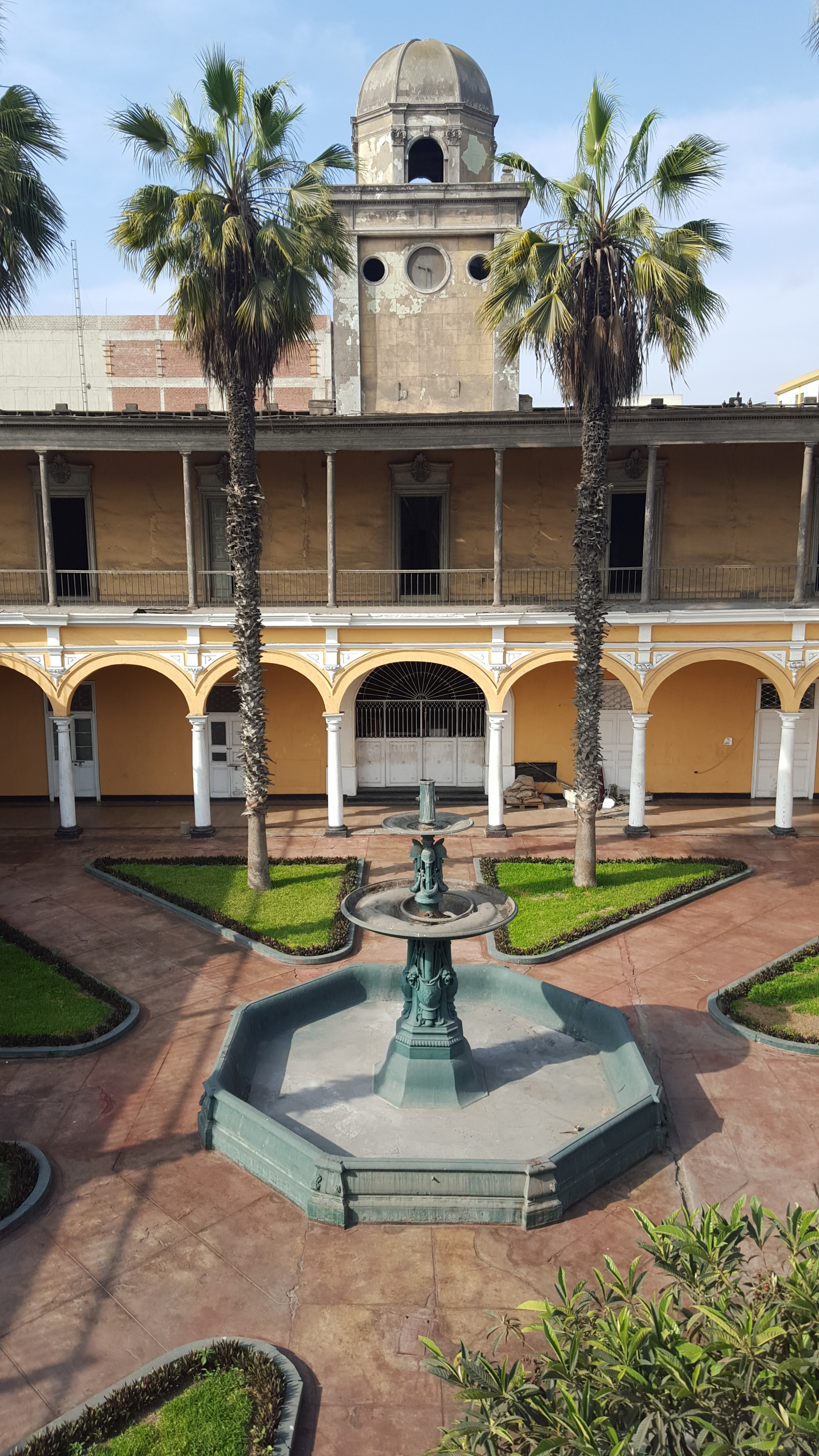
Patio of the former premises of the hospital.

The San Bartolomé hospital was founded in 1651 by the Augustinian priest Friar Bartolomé de Vadillo, with the purpose of being a care center for freed blacks. It was preceded by a shelter first opened in 1646. Vadillo confirmed the need for an establishment of this type, since it happened then that when a black slave stopped being productive, whether due to illness or old age, the master gave him freedom, to avoid taking charge of his care. So there were many freedmen who were left completely helpless.

The hospital was built very close to the Santa Ana hospital (dedicated to the Indians) and the San Andrés hospital (where people of Spanish origin were treated), in the Santa Catalina neighbourhood, San Bartolomé street (ninth block of the current Jirón Miró Quesada), where it operated for more than three hundred years, until in 1988 it was moved to the site it currently occupies.

The facility suffered the ravages of the 1687 earthquake, being partially rebuilt by Sergeant Major Manuel Fernández Dávila, who was the hospital's butler. It suffered a second destruction during the earthquake of 1746, so it had to be completely remodeled.

In 1821 it began to be used to serve the soldiers of the liberating army, especially the Colombians who arrived to fight for the independence of Peru. Once the independent Republic was consolidated, it became a military hospital, its administration and maintenance being carried out by the government. Its staff was headed by a Senior Surgeon, plus a body of surgeons and doctors, as well as students from the San Fernando Faculty of Medicine, external and internal.

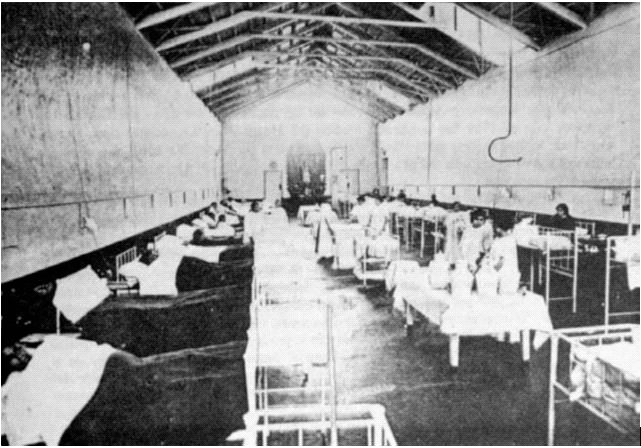
The hospital in the 19th century.

In 1858 the Sisters of Charity of Saint Vincent de Paul joined, to dedicate themselves to the administrative part. In 1866 it passed under the jurisdiction of the Charity of Lima, until 1880 when it returned to government administration, under Nicolás de Piérola.

In 1910, when the military health service of Peru was reorganized, the San Bartolomé hospital became dependent on the military health service. It then adopted the name of San Bartolomé Military Hospital, and functioned as such until 1958, when the modern Central Military Hospital on Brazil Avenue was inaugurated.

The old San Bartolomé hospital was remodeled and expanded in 1961, becoming the Maternal and Child Health Center Hospital, and falling under the direct dependence of the Ministry of Public Health.

In 1988 it moved to the large premises located on the eighth block of Alfonso Ugarte Avenue, which until then had been the headquarters of the National Institute of Neoplastic Diseases. At that time it was called San Bartolomé Maternal and Child Hospital.

== See also ==
- List of hospitals in Peru
