= Óscar Trelles Montes =

Peruvian physician and politician

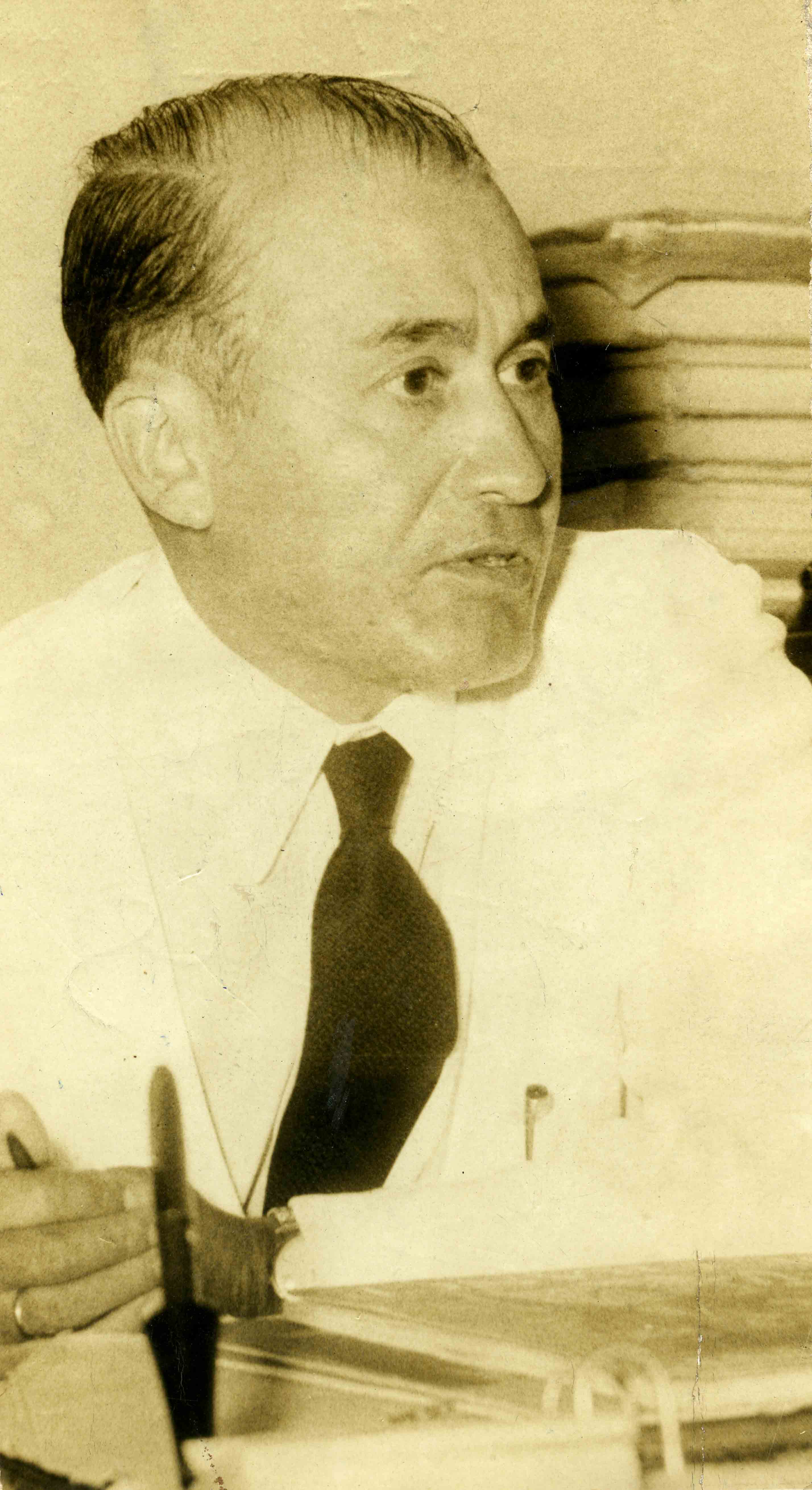
- Montes in 1966

Prime Minister of Peru
- In office July 28, 1963 – December 31, 1963
- President: Fernando Belaúnde
- Preceded by: Nicolás Lindley López
- Succeeded by: Fernando Schwalb

President of the Senate
- In office July 28, 1980 – July 28, 1881
- Preceded by: Luis Alberto Sánchez
- Succeeded by: Javier Alva Orlandini

Ambassador of Peru to France
- In office 1964–1965
- Preceded by: Héctor Boza
- Succeeded by: Francisco Miró Quesada
- In office 1973–1975
- Preceded by: Augusto Morelli
- Succeeded by: Juan Miguel Bákula

Minister of Government and Police
- In office July 28, 1963 – January 1, 1964
- President: Fernando Belaúnde
- Preceded by: Germán Pagador Blondet
- Succeeded by: Juan Languasco

Minister of Public Health and Social Assistance
- In office July 28, 1945 – January 23, 1946
- President: José Luis Bustamante
- Preceded by: Constantino Carvallo
- Succeeded by: Julio Ernesto Portugal

Personal details
- Born: August 23, 1904 Andahuaylas, Peru
- Died: October 2, 1990 (aged 86) Lima, Peru
- Party: Popular Action
- Education: University of Paris; University of San Marcos
- Profession: Physician
- Member of: National Club; Académie Nationale de Médecine

Julio Óscar Trelles Montes (Andahuaylas; August 23, 1904 – Lima; October 2, 1990) was a Peruvian physician and politician. He served as Prime Minister of Peru and Minister of Government and Police from July to December 1963, in the first government of President Fernando Belaúnde Terry. He was also Minister of Public Health and Social Assistance (1945–1946), Senator of the Republic (1980–1985) and President of the Senate (1980–1981).

== Professional career ==
He was the son of Juan Antonio Trelles and María Antonia Montes. He completed his secondary studies in the cities of Cuzco and Lima; He then traveled to France, where he pursued a career in medicine at the University of Paris until graduating as a physician in 1935.

He worked in Paris at the Dejerine Foundation, from 1930 to 1935, with Professor Jean Lhermitte, under whose direction with F. Masquin they published the book Précis d'anatomo-physiologie normale et pathologique du système nerveux. His work in the field of Medicine deserved, in view of his psychiatric clinical work, the Medical-Psychological Society of Paris to give him the Trevel prize in 1934.

After intense scientific activity he returned to Peru in 1936. He revalidated his degree at the University of San Marcos by presenting a thesis on "Protuberance Softening", which won the award from the National Academy of Medicine. Almost immediately he began working at the asylum for incurables "El Refugio" in which he created the first neurological hospital in Peru, called Santo Toribio de Mogrovejo, of which he was director (1940–1974). Thanks to his drive, this hospital became at the forefront of modern knowledge in neuroscience at the national level.

He also opted for a teaching career and was a professor of neurology at San Marcos (1936–1961). He was one of the founders of Cayetano Heredia University.

Together with Honorio Delgado he founded the Journal of Neuropsychiatry in 1938.

== Political career ==
He served as Minister of Public Health and Social Assistance, in the first ministerial cabinet of President José Luis Bustamante y Rivero, from July 28, 1945, to January 23, 1946.

He was one of the founders of the Social Republican Party (Spanish: Partido Social Republicano) in 1948, along with Jorge Basadre, Javier de Belaúnde, Arturo Osores and Julio Villegas. This party was short-lived, but its leaders later went on to form other parties, such as the Christian Democratic Party and Popular Action. Precisely in the latter, founded in 1956, Trelles began his military career, becoming its general secretary in the period from 1958 to 1959 and from 1965 to 1967.

When the first term of the architect Fernando Belaúnde Terry began in July 1963, he was appointed Minister of Government and Prime Minister of Peru. He resigned at the end of that year after being censured in parliament for the violent events that occurred months ago in Cuzco and at the Mollebamba ranch. In that area, peasants demanding agrarian reform had taken over land, leading to a confrontation with the owners, which left 7 dead and 22 injured. This event was exploited by the Aprista-Odriist Congress Coalition to attack the government and bring down the ministerial cabinet.

He later served as Peru's ambassador to France, between 1964 and 1965 and 1973–1975.

Upon the return to democracy, he was elected Senator for the period from 1980 to 1985. He served as president of his Chamber from July 1980 to July 1981.

Later, he returned to his medical profession at the Mogrovejo Hospital.

== Published works ==
- Les Ramollissements protubérantiels (Paris, 1933)
- Précis d'anatomo-physiologie normale et pathologique du système nerveux central (Paris, 1937; 4th edition, 1967), co-written by F. Masquin.
- Jean Lhermitte. Vida y obra (1939)
- La oliva bulbar. Estructura, función, patología (1944), awarded the National Prize for the Promotion of Culture.

== Awards ==
- National Prize for the Promotion of Culture (1943)
- National Culture Award (1980) in the specialty of Biological and Natural Sciences
- Grand Cross of the Order of the Sun of Peru (1963)
- Grand Cross of the Hipólito Unanue Order (1963)
- Grand Cross of the Ordre national du Mérite, Paris (1965)
- Commander of the Legion of Honour (1970)
- Honorary doctorate from the University of Aix-en-Provence (1965)
- Professor emeritus of Cayetano Heredia University (1974)
- Honorary doctorate from the Universidad Argentina John F. Kennedy (1976)
- Honorary doctorate from the Sorbonne University, in Paris (1977)
- Member of the Académie Nationale de Médecine
- Honorary professor at the Faculty of Medicine of the University of Chile (1959)

== See also ==
- National Institute of Neurological Sciences, named after him

Political offices
Preceded by —	Senator of Peru (representing Lima); July 27, 1980–July 26, 1985	Succeeded by —
Preceded by Celso Pastor de la Torre	2nd Secretary-General of Acción Popular; 1959–1961	Succeeded by Gastón Acurio Velarde
Preceded by Gastón Acurio Velarde	4th Secretary-General of Acción Popular; 1965–1967	Succeeded by José María de la Jara y Ureta
