= The Neighborhood (novel) =

2016 novel by Mario Vargas Llosa

- First edition cover
- Author: Mario Vargas Llosa
- Audio read by: Julio García
- Original title: Cinco esquinas
- Translator: Edith Grossman
- Cover artist: Vanja Milicevic; Morgana Vargas Llosa
- Language: Spanish
- Set in: Lima
- Publisher: Alfaguara
- Publication date: 3 March 2016
- Publication place: Spain/Peru
- English publication date: 2018
- Media type: Print (paperback)
- Pages: 314
- ISBN: 978-84-204-1896-4
- Dewey Decimal: 863/.64
- LC Class: PQ8498.32.A65 C495 2016

The Neighborhood (Spanish: Cinco esquinas, lit. 'Five Corners') is a 2016 novel by Mario Vargas Llosa. It was published on 3 March 2016 by Alfaguara in Spain, Latin America, and the United States.

== Plot ==
Set in Lima in the 1990s during the presidency of Alberto Fujimori, the editor of the notorious tabloid Exposed, Rolando Garro, is found beaten and stabbed to death and his body left outside a gambling parlor. Enrique Cárdenas and Juan Peineta, both of whom had their reputations destroyed by Exposed, are suspected of killing Garro. Cárdenas was blackmailed by Garro to invest in his tabloid otherwise he would publish nude photos of Cárdenas. Cárdenas refused to meet the demands of Garro and had his reputation damaged when the photos were published. Peineta is a disgraced former television star and, before Garro's death, would send embittered letters to Exposed.

== Title ==
The novel's title, Cinco esquinas, refers to an area in the Barrios Altos neighborhood of the Lima District, where the story is set.

== Reception ==
Kirkus Reviews called the novel a "colorful but confusing and ultimately disappointing work by a great writer."

Publishers Weekly gave the novel a rave review, calling it a "audacious and skillful" and comparing it to Thomas Pynchon's Inherent Vice.

Boyd Tonkin, writing for the Financial Times, largely praised the novel and saying it "pulses along with a zest and cunning not commonly found among octogenarian Nobel laureates" as well as calling it "punchily translated by the ever-excellent Edith Grossman."

Anthony Quinn of The Guardian felt the novel "never achieves a truly compulsive rhythm" and criticized Edith Grossman's translation for "tripping up" the reading experience.
