= Peruvian American Medical Society =

The Peruvian American Medical Society (PAMS) is a US-based medical nonprofit organization that organizes medical missions and offers medical care to underserved communities in Peru.

PAMS consists of medical volunteers of various specialties who donate their time and skills on medical missions to Peru to bring free quality medical care to various regions of the country. Medical personnel such as doctors, nurses, and dentists work in collaboration with local providers and medical schools to provide care for thousands of patients. In cooperation with US & Peruvian companies and organizations, PAMS has organized missions to more than 25 different cities in Peru and have donated millions of dollars in medical equipment and supplies. All proceeds from fundraising activities go to the purchase of medical supplies that are brought over to Peru.

PAMS important projects include development of burn units in Arequipa and Iquitos, dialysis units in Cusco and Lima, a national reference cardiovascular unit and surgical training at Dos de Mayo National Hospital, and a specialty course in Family Therapy in Domestic Violence, accredited by the Andina University in Cusco. With the cooperation of local private and public organizations, PAMS developed a Medical Educational Center in Chincha after the devastating earthquake of 2007 that officially opened in March 2011. The continuous goal is to modernize pediatric, neonatal, gastrointestinal, cardiac and surgical units of local healthcare facilities.

== History of PAMS ==
Peruvian American Medical Society was founded on September 8, 1973 by a group of Peruvian physicians in Atlanta, Georgia. Soon, many chapters were formed in various parts of the country. There are now over 400 Society members involved. In the Regional and University Chapters.

== PAMS Executive Committee ==
All leadership positions are voluntary and uncompensated. During the Business Meeting, in the early spring, and the Annual Meeting, in the summer, the leadership of the organization meets to conduct business with the general membership.

== Missions ==
Since the late 1970s, members have conducted more than 100 medical and educational missions to Peru. Past and present mission locations include:

• Abancay • Amazon-Andahuaylilas • Arequipa • Ayacucho • Cajamarca • Cangallo • Chiclayo • Chincha • Chorrillos • Collique • Contamana • Cuzco - Belen Clinic • Cuzco - Hospital Antonio Lorena • Huancavelica • Huaran • Ica • Iquitos - Selva in Action • Lima – La Posadita del Buen Pastor • Lima - Cardio & Thoracic Surgery • Santiago de Chuco • Marjuni • Motupe • Pisco • Piura • Tacna • Tarma • Trujillo • Yantalo
