= National Maternal Perinatal Institute =

Hospital in Peru

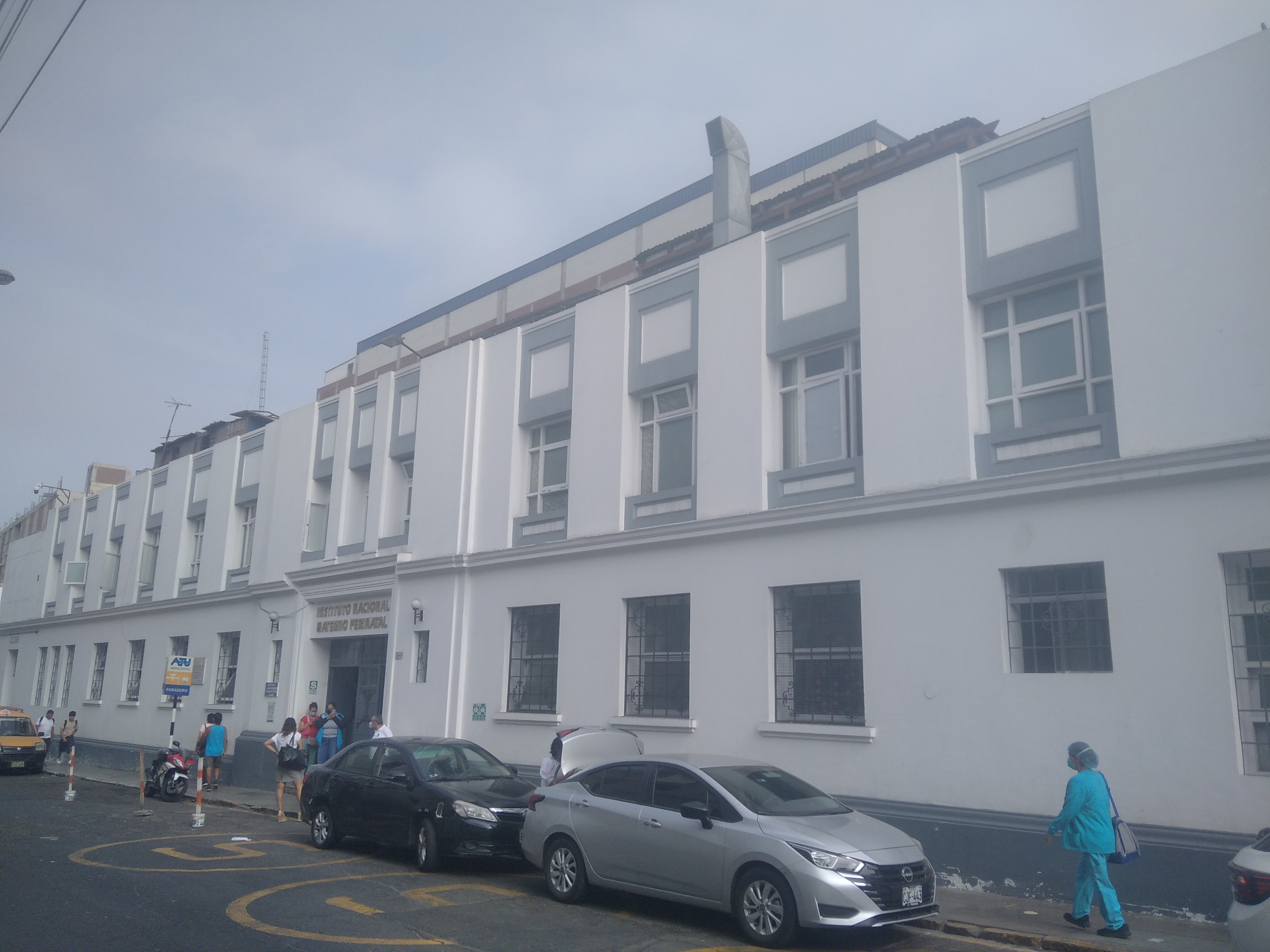

Geography
- Location: Jr. Sta. Rosa 941, Lima
- Coordinates: 12.0524°S 77.0221°W

Organisation
- Type: Maternity hospital

Services
- Beds: 416

History
- Former name: Maternity of Lima
- Opened: 1830

Links
- Website: www.inmp.gob.pe

The National Maternal Perinatal Institute (Spanish: Instituto Nacional Materno Perinatal, INMP), formerly known as the Maternity of Lima (Spanish: Maternidad de Lima), is a maternity hospital located in the neighbourhood of Barrios Altos, in Lima, Peru.

== History ==
The hospital, then the Maternity House of Lima (Spanish: Casa de Maternidad de Lima), was established on October 10, 1826, through a supreme decree issued by then Prime Minister Andrés de Santa Cruz, with the purpose of "helping poor women in their births and training educated midwives." An important role in this decision was played by Hipólito Unanue, then Minister of State.

The French obstetrician Benita Paulina Cadeau de Fessel, recently arrived in Peru, was appointed as director of the establishment. While the premises were being built, a "birth clinic" was established at the Hospital of the Holy Spirit, under the direction of Fessel herself.

The maternity hospital began operating in 1830, in the Hospital de la Caridad, with instruments brought from Paris, which were considered luxurious. When said hospital was closed in 1841, the maternity hospital was moved to the Santa Ana Hospital, and years later, to the San Ildefonso School premises, where it remained until 1875, when it was relocated to the San Andrés Hospital. In 1877 it returned to work at the Santa Ana Hospital, until the closure of this hospital in 1925.

It was precisely in a sector of the extensive land occupied by the old Santa Ana Hospital that the Lima Maternity Hospital building was built, a work carried out by the Charity of Lima and which was inaugurated in 1934. It is the site where it continues to operate until the date.

In 1962, the hospital became dependent on the Ministry of Public Health. In 1968, a new four-storey building was inaugurated with sterilization services, an obstetric center, a surgical center, and a neonatology service; equipped with modern medical and surgical instruments.

In 1992, it became the National Maternal Perinatal Institute, a new name that announced a higher level, by incorporating research and teaching into its functions.

In 2006 it was categorized as a III-2 Health Establishment, the one with the greatest medical-surgical complexity for maternal-perinatal care in the country.

On average per year, the INMP registers about 22,000 births. The monthly average is 1,858 births, and about 60 births occur per day, including normal births and cesarean sections.

== See also ==
- Healthcare in Peru
- List of hospitals in Peru
