= Dos de Mayo National Hospital =

Hospital in Peru

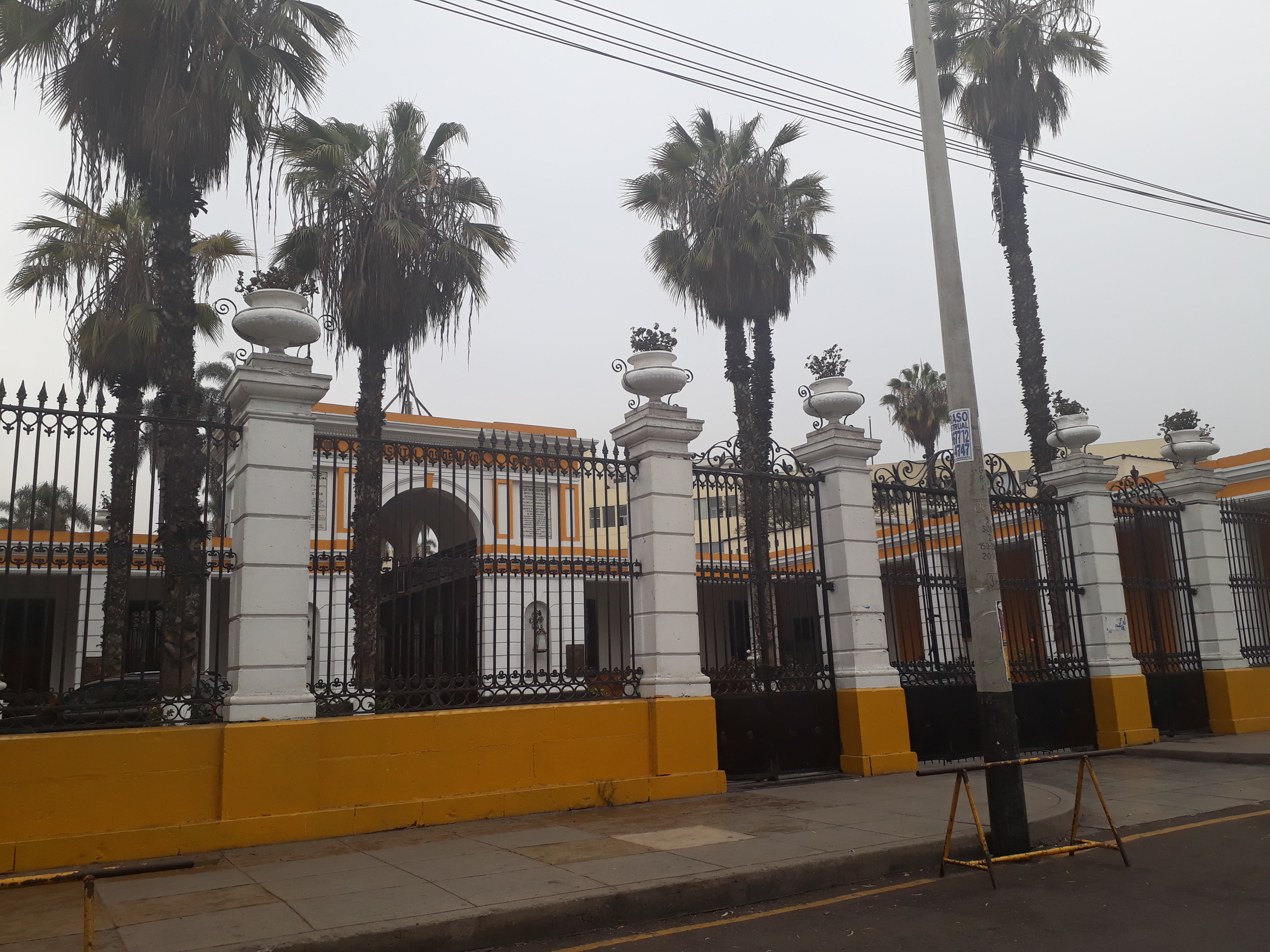

Geography
- Location: Barrios Altos, Lima, Peru

History
- Former name: Hospital Real de San Andrés
- Opened: February 28, 1875

Dos de Mayo National Hospital (Spanish: Hospital Nacional Dos de Mayo) is a public hospital in the neighbourhood of Barrios Altos, part of the historic centre of Lima, Peru. It is considered the first hospital of the republican history of the country, and was preceded by the Royal Hospital of Saint Andrew, itself the oldest hospital of the Viceroyalty of Peru.

== History ==
The hospital dates back to the creation of the Hospital of Our Lady of the Conception (Spanish: Hospital de Nuestra Señora de la Concepción) in 1538, located at the Jirón Lima, next to the current Convent of Santo Domingo. The hospital was later moved to the neighbourhood of Barrios Altos, where it became known as the Royal Hospital of Saint Andrew (Spanish: Hospital Real de San Andrés), operating until President Pedro Diez Canseco decreed the founding of a modern and larger hospital due to the needs of the time. Its construction was funded by the surplus income of the Charity of Lima, the existing fund of the brotherhoods that was in deposit and a government allowance amounting to S/. 2,000 per month. It lasted six years and seven months in total.

The new hospital was inaugurated on February 28, 1875, by then president Manuel Pardo y Lavalle. On March 8, the inmates from the Royal Hospital were moved to the new building. During the War of the Pacific, the hospital was occupied by the Chilean Army from February 20, 1881, to December 29, 1883, with only children being able to receive attention.

On October 5, 1885, sixth-year medical student Daniel Alcides Carrión succumbed to his condition at the hospital. Carrión had been studying the link between the so-called Oroya fever and Peruvian wart. The disease later became known as Carrion's disease, and every year the Day of Peruvian Medicine is celebrated on the anniversary of his death. Carrión is buried in a mausoleum on the premises of the hospital, and was declared a national hero on October 7, 1991.

The hospice system at the end of the 19th century varied in the following way; outpatient care in 1891, first clinical laboratory in 1900. Then, treatment for tuberculosis was introduced and in 1913 night reception of patients was enabled.

For fifty years, inspectors of the Charity of Lima was in charge of managing the hospital, who were chosen from among the members of the institution; Starting in 1921, the first medical director was appointed, who was Dr. Leonidas Avendaño.

== See also ==
- Royal Hospital of Saint Andrew
