= Jirón Santa Rosa =

Street in Lima, Peru

- Jirón Antonio Miró Quesada
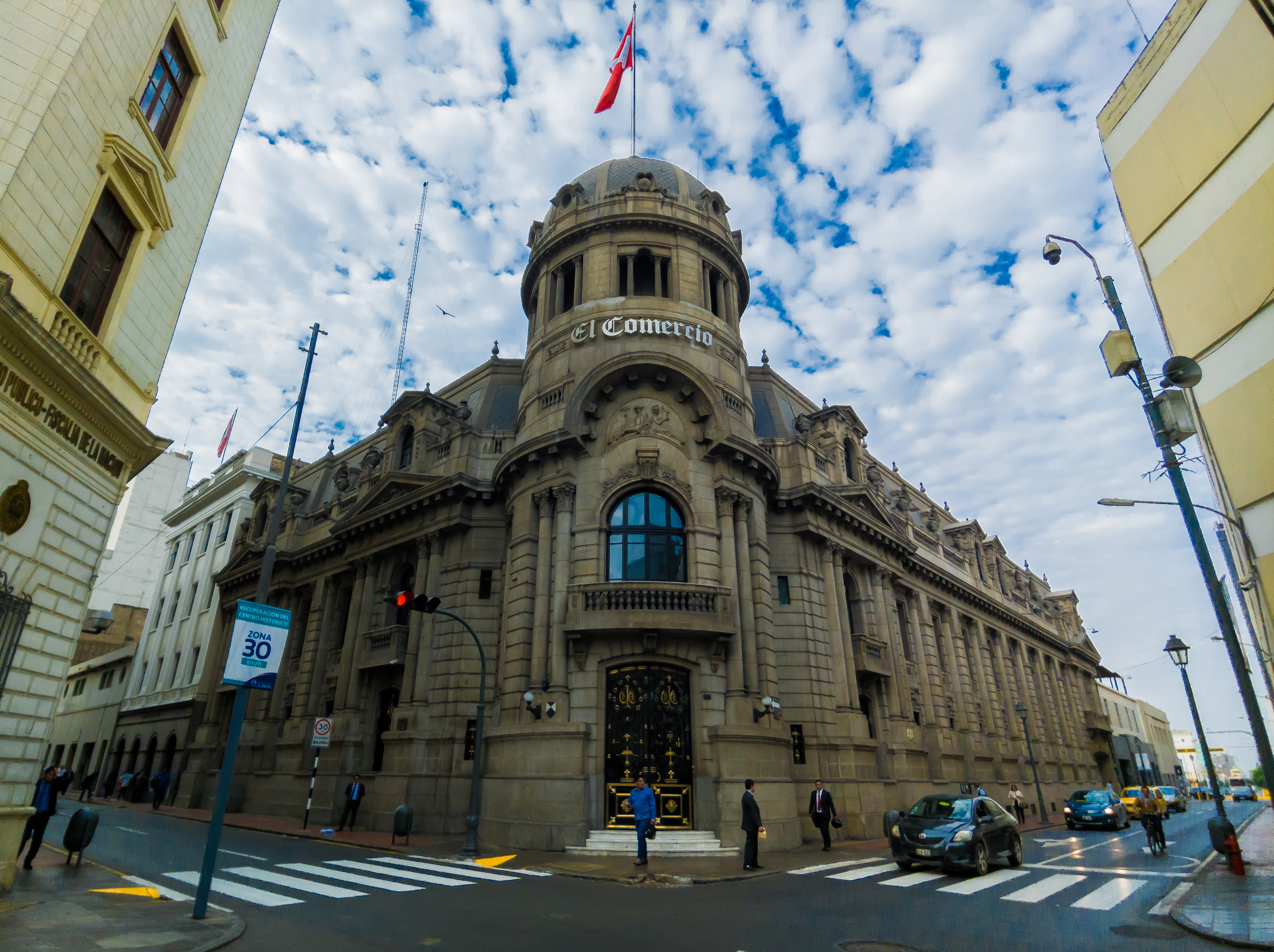
- Headquarters of El Comercio
- Part of: Damero de Pizarro
- Namesake: Saint Rose of Lima
- From: Jirón de la Unión
- Major junctions: Jirón Carabaya, Jirón Lampa, Jirón Azángaro, Abancay Avenue
- To: Miguel Grau Avenue

Construction
- Completed: 1535

Santa Rosa Street (Spanish: Jirón Santa Rosa) is a major street in the Damero de Pizarro, located in the historic centre of Lima, Peru. The street starts at its intersection with the Jirón de la Unión and continues until it reaches Miguel Grau Avenue.

== Name ==
The street's name comes from the project that was ultimately adopted in 1862, which replaced the city's traditional names with names that reflected the country's political geography. The term jirón is a type of street, whose axis is formed from a variety of different, single-block streets. It was first known as Ayacucho Street (Spanish: Jirón Ayacucho), (Note: This name has since been applied to a street in Barrios Altos formerly known as Urubamba Street (Spanish: Jirón Urubamba).) after the Department of Ayacucho.

It was known from 1949 until 2017 as Antonio Miró Quesada Street (Spanish: Jirón Antonio Miró Quesada), a dedication to Antonio Miró Quesada de la Guerra, a director of El Comercio—a newspaper whose building is on the street's second block—who was assassinated alongside his wife in 1935. This name remained until 2017, when it was renamed after Rose of Lima.

== History ==
The road that today constitutes the street was laid by Francisco Pizarro when he founded the city of Lima on January 18, 1535. In 1862, when a new urban nomenclature was adopted, the road was named jirón Ayacucho, after the Department of Ayacucho. Prior to this renaming, each block (cuadra) had a unique name:

- Block 1: Jesús Nazareno, after the chapel of the same name.
- Block 2: Núñez, after Dr. Miguel Núñez (Lima, 1646 — Madrid, ?), who lived there.
- Block 3: Rifa, after a raffle establishment located there.
- Block 4: Botica de San Pedro, after a pharmacy run by the Jesuits.
- Block 5: Aduana
- Block 6: Santa Rosa de las Monjas, after the monastery located there.
- Block 7: Rectora, for reasons unknown.
- Block 8: Siete Jeringas, after either a curandero or its proximity to the Royal Hospital of Saint Andrew
- Block 9: San Bartolomé, after a hospital of the same name, later the Military Hospital.
- Block 10: Huaquilla, after a huaca located there.
- Block 11: Naranjos, after an orange field located there.
- Block 13: Ancha/Cinco Esquinas, for its width in comparison to other streets at the time, and for reaching a point where five corners are located, respectively.

The Edificio Fabbri, whose construction concluded in 1890, is located in the street. During the 17th century, it belonged to the heirs of Pedro Gavilán y González de la Torre, thus acquiring the name of the "Casa de los Gavilanes". (Note: A play-on-words on the heirs' family name, Gavilán, which is also a type of bird in Spanish.) It was acquired in 1867 by the Peruvian State to house its official printing press, organised by Manuel Atanasio Fuentes.

The street was renamed following a ceremony on April 7, 1949, in honour of Antonio Miró Quesada de la Guerra. This name remained until 2017, when it was renamed in honour of Saint Rose of Lima by the Municipality of Lima.

=== Recent history ===
In 2016, four houses collapsed in the street's 12th block, affecting 13 families living there.

== See also ==
- Historic Centre of Lima
- Lima District
