= Universidad Argentina John F. Kennedy =

John F. Kennedy Argentine University
- Universidad Argentina John F. Kennedy
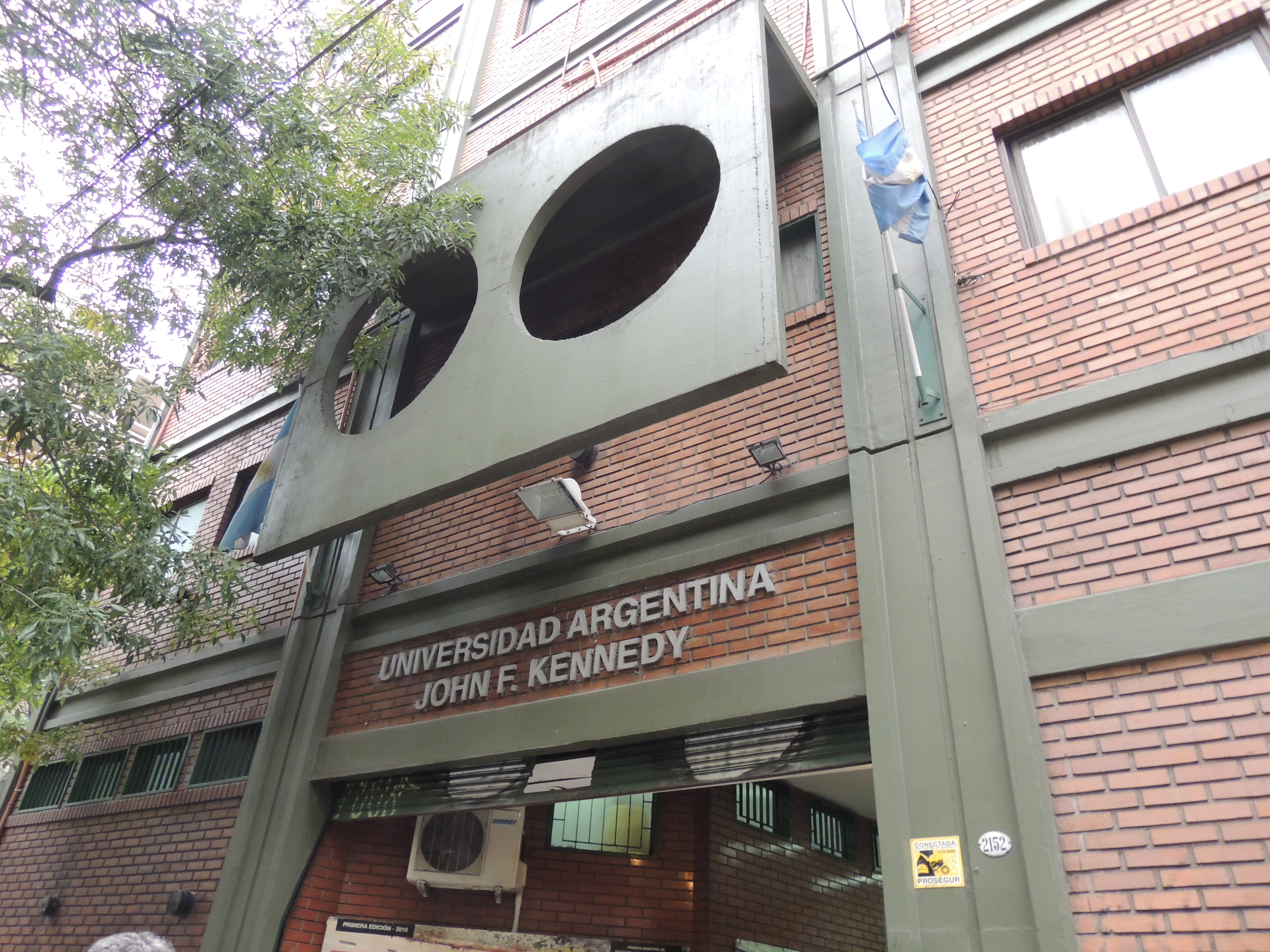
- Motto: Trinus et unus: Vita, Spiritus et Societas
- Type: Private
- Established: 1964; 62 years ago
- Rector: Dr. María Elisa Herren de David
- Students: 21,287 (as of 2000)
- Location: Buenos Aires, Argentina
- Campus: Urban
- Website: kennedy.edu.ar
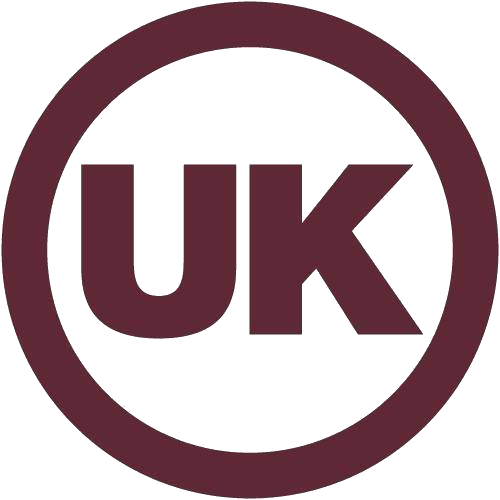

The John F. Kennedy Argentine University (Spanish: Universidad Argentina John F. Kennedy, often shortened as "Universidad Kennedy") is an Argentine private university. It was founded by Miguel Herrera Figueroa on April 4, 1964, in the city of Buenos Aires. The university has 18 units in the city of Buenos Aires and two in Buenos Aires Province.

In 2008, it had 39 academic departments and a students department, where activities related to sports are developed with the Kennedy Choir and the Theater Workshop.

== Schools ==
- Law
- Architecture
- Biochemistry
- Accounting
- Pharmacy
- Licenciatura in Business Administration
- Licenciatura in Hotel Administration
- Licenciatura in International Trade
- Licenciatura in Demography and Tourism
- Licenciatura in Graphic Design
- Licenciatura in Journalism and Communication
- Licenciatura in Psychology
- Licenciatura in Psycho-pedagogy
- Licenciatura in Publicity
- Licenciatura in Chemistry
- Licenciatura in International Relations
- Licenciatura in Labor Relations
- Licenciatura in Public Relations
- Social Worker
- Licenciatura in Social Work
- Systems Analyst
- Odontology
- Agent for Judicial Matters
- Teacher Training in Computer Studies
- Teacher Training in Education Sciences
- University Teacher Training Program
- On line Education

N.B. Under the Argentine education system, a Licenciatura is equivalent to a B.S. or a B.A. degree.

== Graduate degrees ==
- Doctorate in Law
- Doctorate in Social Psychology
- Major in Criminal Sciences
- Major in Clinical Psychology
- Major in Orthodontics
- Master in Psychoanalysis

== See also ==
- List of memorials to John F. Kennedy
