= Church of the Holy Christ of Wonders =

Church in Lima, Peru

Coordinates: 12.0450°S 77.0122°W

- Iglesia del Santo Cristo de las Maravillas
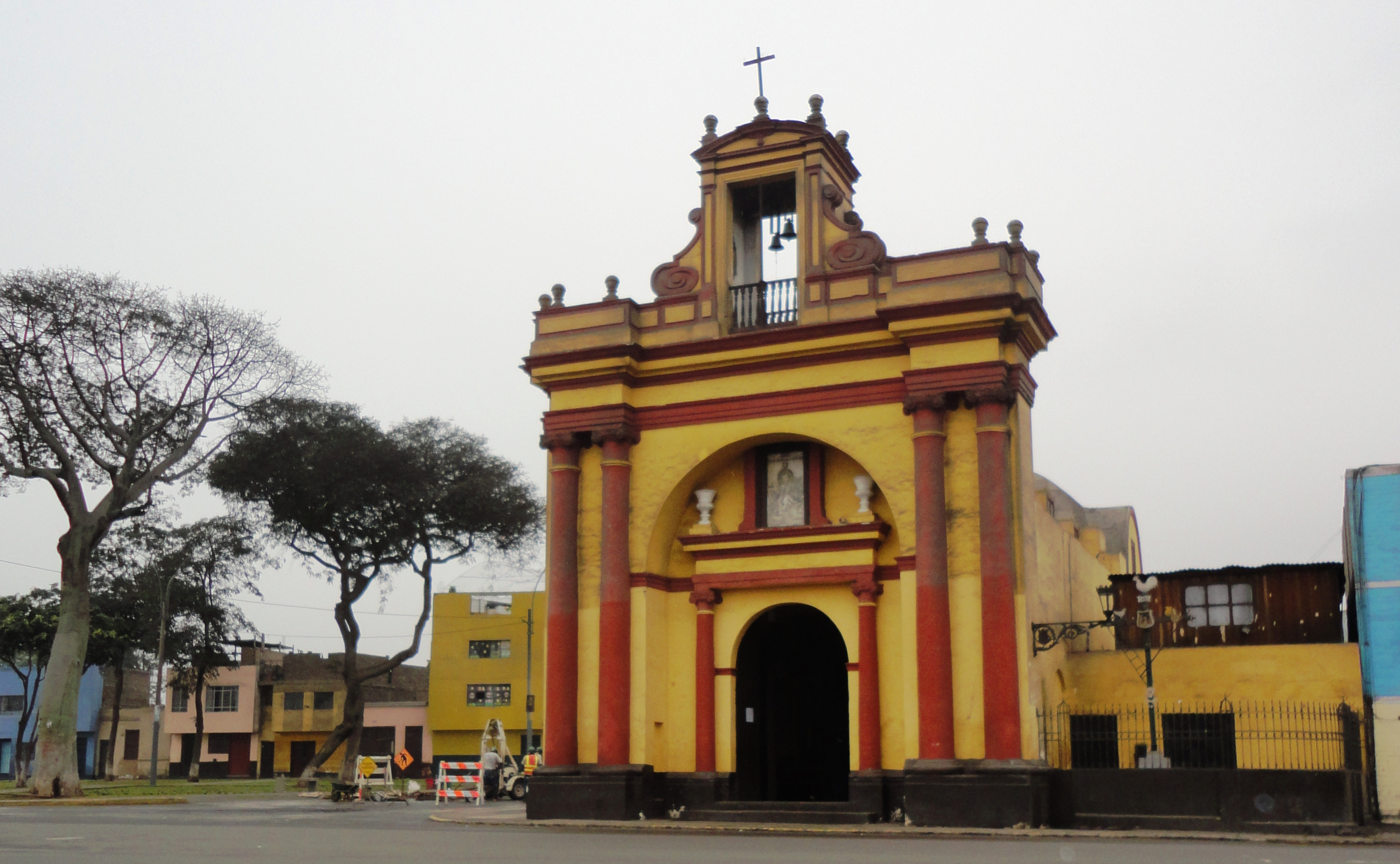
- The church in 2011

Religion
- Affiliation: Catholic
- Governing body: Archdiocese of Lima

Location
- Location: Barrios Altos
- Interactive map of Church of the Holy Christ of Wonders

Architecture
- Style: Neoclassical

The Church of the Holy Christ of Wonders (Spanish: Iglesia del Santo Cristo de las Maravillas) is a Catholic church located at the junction of Jirón Áncash and Sebastián Lorente Avenue. Located in the neighbourhood of Barrios Altos. It is part of the historic centre of Lima, Peru. It is named after the devotion of the same name.

== History ==
The church was originally located in front of one of the gates of the Walls of Lima that was named after it.

In the first half of the 18th century, the existence of the Chapel of the Holy Christ of Wonders is already documented. The freedman, Andrés de Jesús, became a collector of alms from this holy image, which was venerated in his chapel located near the Cercado neighbourhood, on the road that leads to the Lati Valley.

The construction of the current temple is completely neoclassical, attributed to Matías Maestro. It is perhaps the only church built entirely according to neoclassical canons before independence. It has a rectangular floor plan, with a single nave and a barrel vault. Its façade of Ionic columns and smooth pediment is harmonious and proportionate, within the notable academic correctness that emanates from the entire complex, it is located in the form of an arch within which the façade with classical lines is located. It is worth highlighting the presence of an old road cross on the left side of the cover, completely renovated.

This church was the old starting point for funeral processions to the General Cemetery of Lima, given its location, which precedes the cemetery's foundation in 1808.

Today the church is run by the daughters of charity of Saint Vincent de Paul and the lay people of the community. The founding feast of this church is September 14, a date on which the laity celebrate in a big way thanks to the support of their faithful.

== See also ==
- Historic Centre of Lima
- Barrios Altos
