= Royal Hospital of Saint Andrew =

Former hospital in Peru

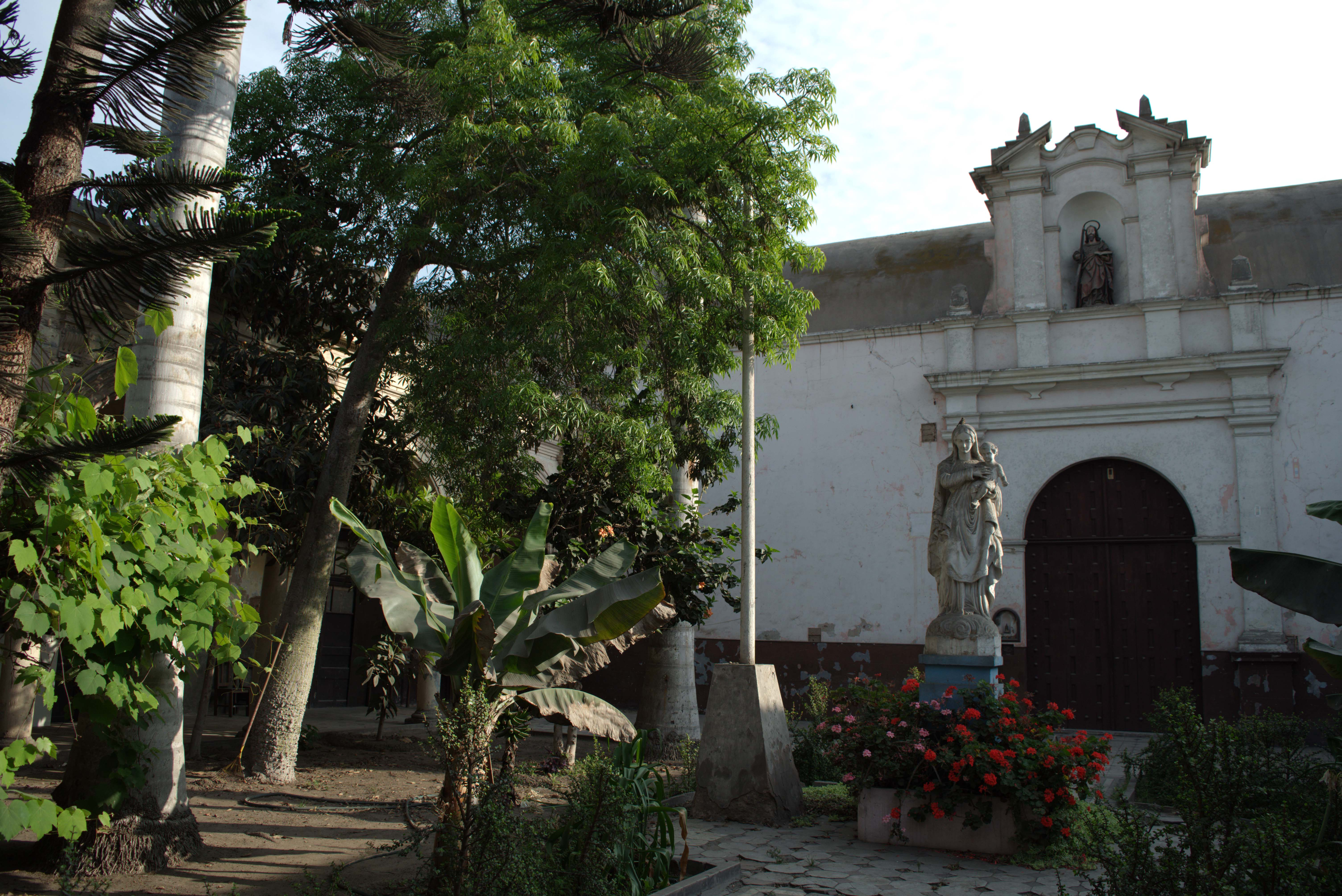
- The former hospital in 2020

Geography
- Location: Barrios Altos, Lima, Peru

Organisation
- Type: Hospital
- Religious affiliation: Catholic Church
- Patron: Andrés Hurtado de Mendoza

History
- Former name: Hospital of Our Lady of the Conception
- Opened: January 1, 1552
- Closed: March 8, 1875

The Royal Hospital of Saint Andrew (Spanish: Hospital Real de San Andrés), originally known as the Hospital of Our Lady of the Conception (Spanish: Hospital de Nuestra Señora de la Concepción), was a hospital in the neighbourhood of Barrios Altos, part of the historic centre of Lima, Peru.

The hospital is notable due to the fact that it was the first hospital in both the country and South America. It is also linked to the National University of San Marcos and its early history of healthcare studies, and once housed a number of mummies of the Inca Empire's nobility, including that of Pachacuti.

In 1875, given the extensive hospital needs of the capital, the Dos de Mayo National Hospital was established in a new location, which inherited the responsibilities of the old royal hospital.

== History ==
It is known that on March 16, 1538, the Cabildo of Lima assigned two plots of land for the operation of the Hospital of Nuestra Señora de la Concepción (located at the Jirón Lima, next to the current Convent of Santo Domingo). The narrowness of its environments meant that on November 21, 1545, the same council assigned eight lots for the relocation of the hospital in front of the current Plaza Italia. This new hospital was called the Royal Hospital of Saint Andrew and the transfer of patients and belongings took place in 1550, and its continuous operation began between 1552 and 1553.

The hospital was also home to the first anatomical amphitheatre in 1792; from the Royal School of Medicine of San Fernando in 1811 and the first House of the Sisters of Charity of Saint Vincent de Paul.

In 1868 a yellow fever epidemic hit Lima, causing 6,000 deaths. This, added to the growth of the population and the inconvenience of the old hospitals that existed in the city, led on May 1, 1868, President Pedro Diez Canseco to decree the founding of a modern and larger hospital, which was named Dos de Mayo, in homage to the Battle of Callao fought on May 2, 1866, against Spain. The funds for this purpose came from three sources: the surplus income of the Charity of Lima, the existing fund of the brotherhoods that was in deposit and a Government allowance amounting to S/. 2,000 per month.

In the Hospital of San Andrés there was an area dedicated to the care of people who had lost their minds, called the "loqueria", which operated until December 16, 1859, when all its occupants were transferred to the new Hospital Civil de la Misericordia. The royal hospital continued to operate until March 8, 1875, when all patients transferred to the newly inaugurated Dos de Mayo Hospital. The premises then functioned as a convent of the Sisters of Charity of Saint Vincent de Paul, and since 1929, of the Daughters of Mary Immaculate. Later, part of the land ended up being converted into the current San Andrés Police Station (in front of the Plaza Italia), and the rest was used by the Óscar Miró Quesada School, until in 2007 the students were evacuated by Civil Defense, due to the risk of collapse. Since December 2009, the Charity of Lima manages the 5,000 m^{2} that remain of the 10,000 that the former San Andrés hospital had when it was founded in 1552.

=== Mummies ===
There are several accounts from chroniclers that talk about the preservation of several Inca mummies, among these those of the Sapa Inca Pachacuti in the spaces of the Royal Hospital. For example, in 1560, Garcilaso de la Vega, a descendant of the Inca monarchs, visited Polo de Ondegardo's house prior to leaving for Spain, describing the mummies in his Comentarios Reales de los Incas. More references to the mummies are made in relation to the hospital in 1590 and 1638. Unsuccessful attempts to dig up the mummies were made in 1876 by Teodorico Olaechea and José Toribio Polo, as well as José de la Riva-Agüero y Osma in 1937. In 2002 and 2005, efforts were carried out by the University of San Marcos (with support from the University of Chicago and the National Geographic Society) that unveiled a colonial cemetery, among other things. An effort led by architect Edgar Santa Cruz and archaeologist Héctor Walde intends to turn the hospital as a museum of Peruvian medicine.

== Recent history ==
The former hospital was damaged in 2010 after it was leased by the Charity to businessman Luis Alberto Rodríguez, who attempted to fix the dilapidated building with concrete. The building's remaining 5,000 square metres are divided into two parts: the part that was leased to Rodríguez and the part where the Óscar Miró Quesada de la Guerra School operated until the late 20th century.

It is currently used as a workshop where the Balconies of Lima are maintained and fixed.

== Gallery ==
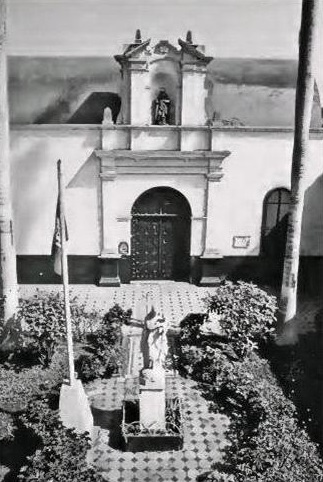
Main patio

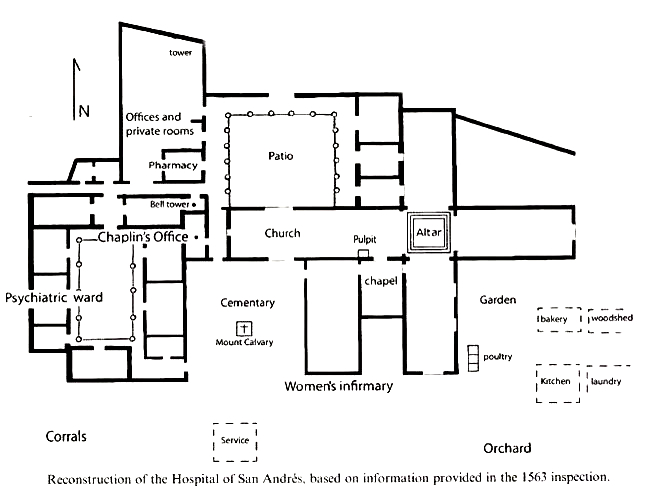
Map of the hospital

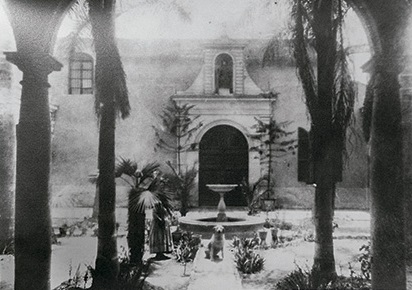
Patio with fountain

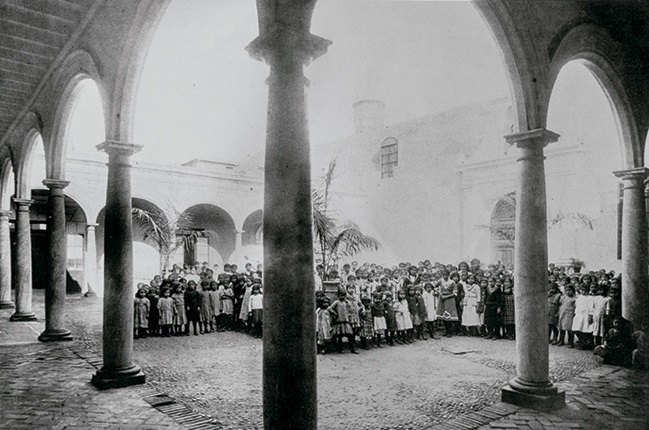
Crowd at the hospital

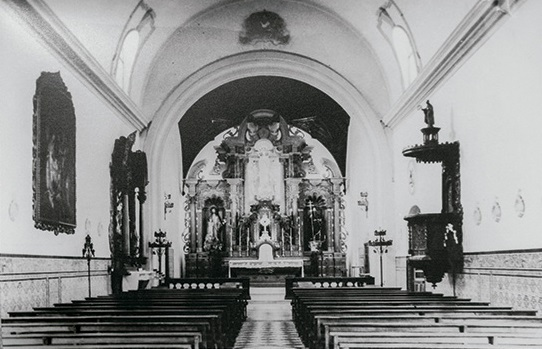
The hospital's chapel

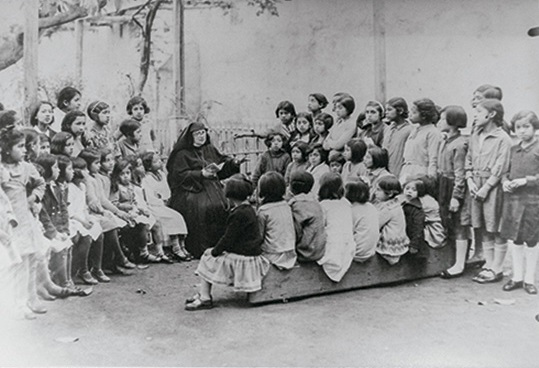
A Marian nun talking to people

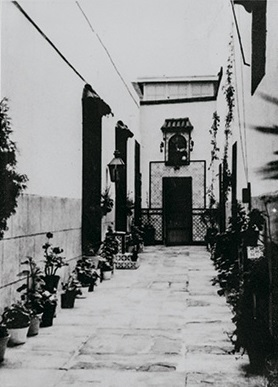
Inside view of the hospital

== See also ==
- Healthcare in Peru
- Faculty of Medicine of the National University of San Marcos
