= Plaza Italia, Lima =

Cultural heritage site in Peru

Coordinates: 12°03′03″S 77°01′22″W

Italy Square
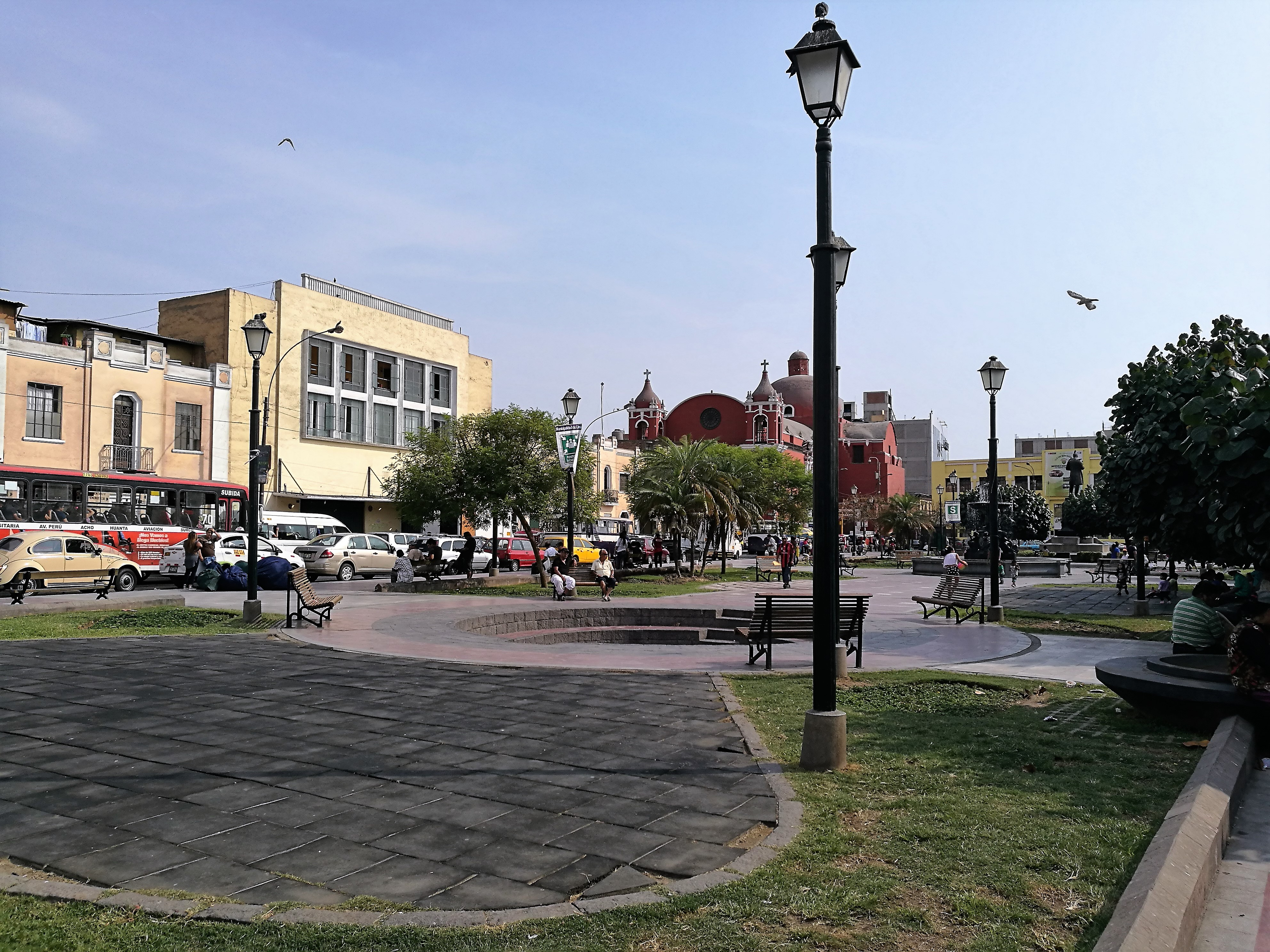

- Location within Lima
- Location: Lima, Peru

History
- Built: 16th century

UNESCO World Heritage Site
- Official name: Plaza Italia
- Type: Non-movable
- Criteria: Monument
- Designated: 1991
- Part of: Historic Centre of Lima
- Reference no.: 500

Italy Square (Spanish: Plaza Italia), formerly known as Saint Anne's Square (Spanish: Plaza Santa Ana), is a public square in the Barrios Altos neighbourhood of Lima, Peru. It was the second square built by the Spanish during the colonial era and later served as one of the four squares where the independence of Peru was declared in the city.

== History ==
The second square to be laid out in Lima, it took its original name from the Indian hospital located next to it. Of this hospital, only the chapel remains, currently functioning as a church. With the construction of the neighbourhood or redoubt of Cercado de Indias, later known as Santiago del Cercado, a series of streets were laid out that would give rise to the current neighbourhood of Barrios Altos.

In 1821, José de San Martín declared the Independence of Peru in this square, as he had previously done in the Plaza de Armas and the square of La Merced. In the middle of the 19th century, in its surroundings, the largest Italian neighbourhood of the city was established, highlighting among them the Quinta Carbone and the Quinta Baselli. In honour of one of its greatest neighbours, the Italian naturalist Antonio Raimondi, it was renamed Plaza Italia after the inauguration of the monument in 1910 by then president Guillermo Billinghurst.

== Gallery ==
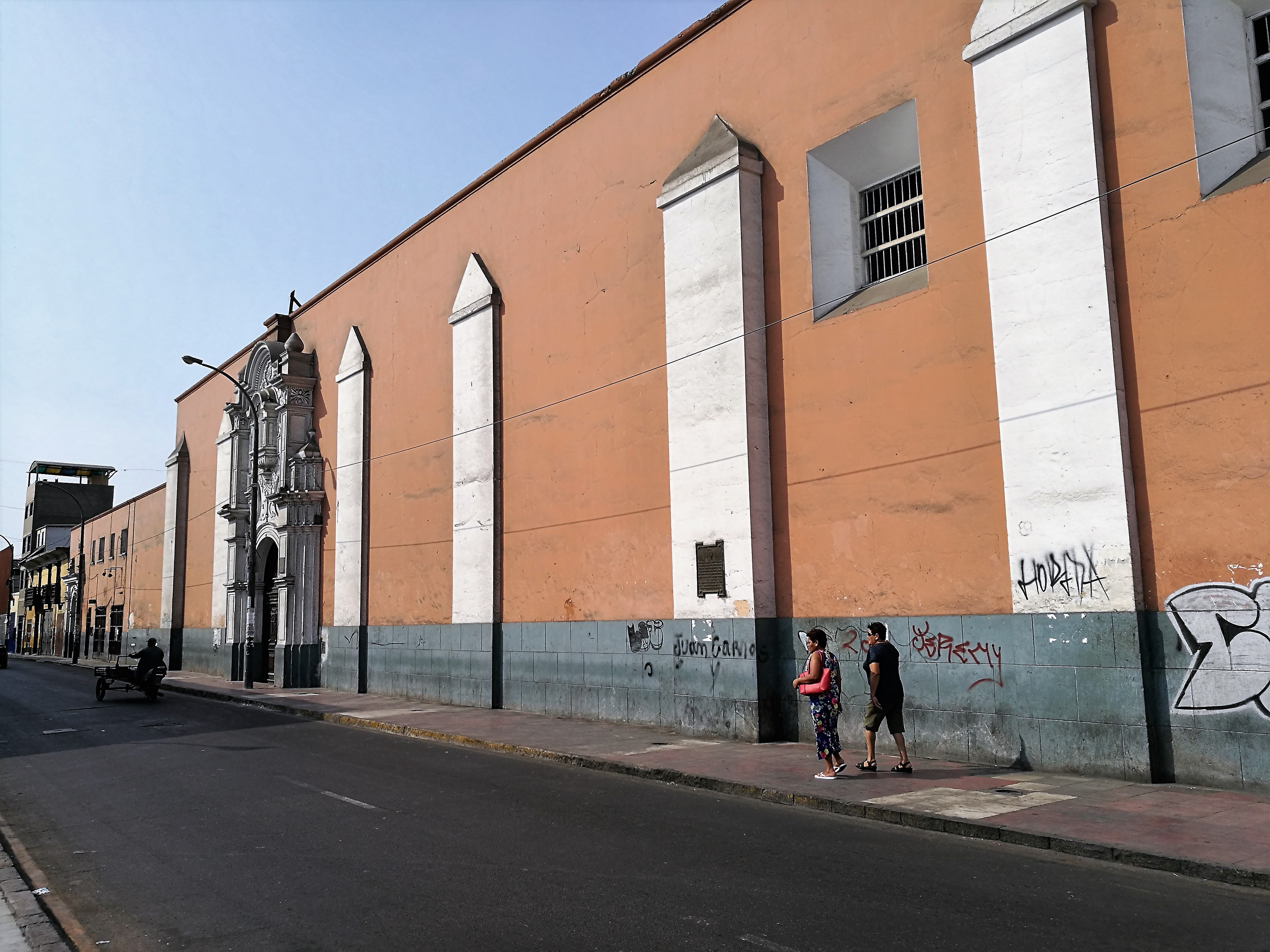
Church of the Heart of Jesus (a.k.a. San José)

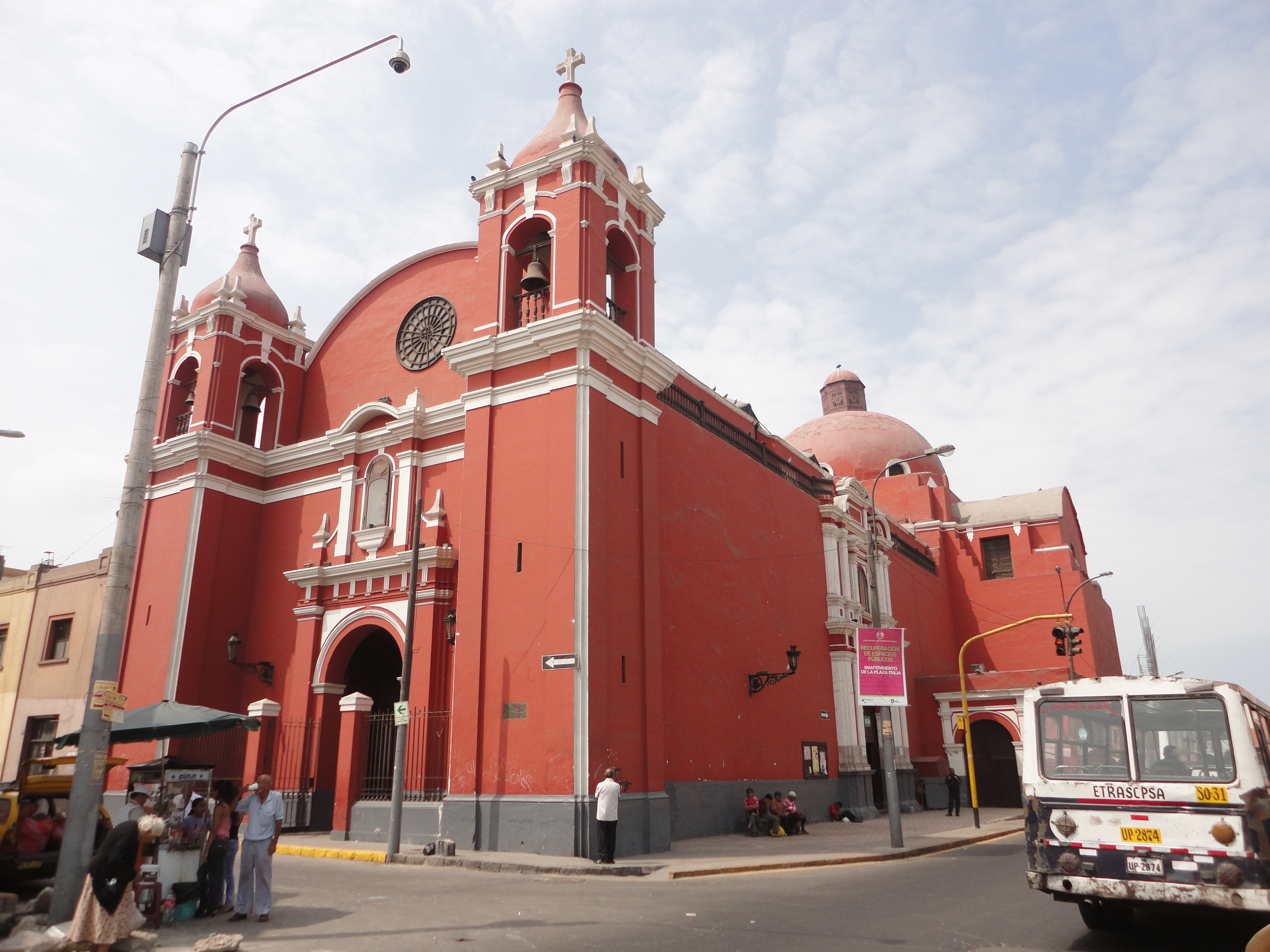
Church of Saint Anne

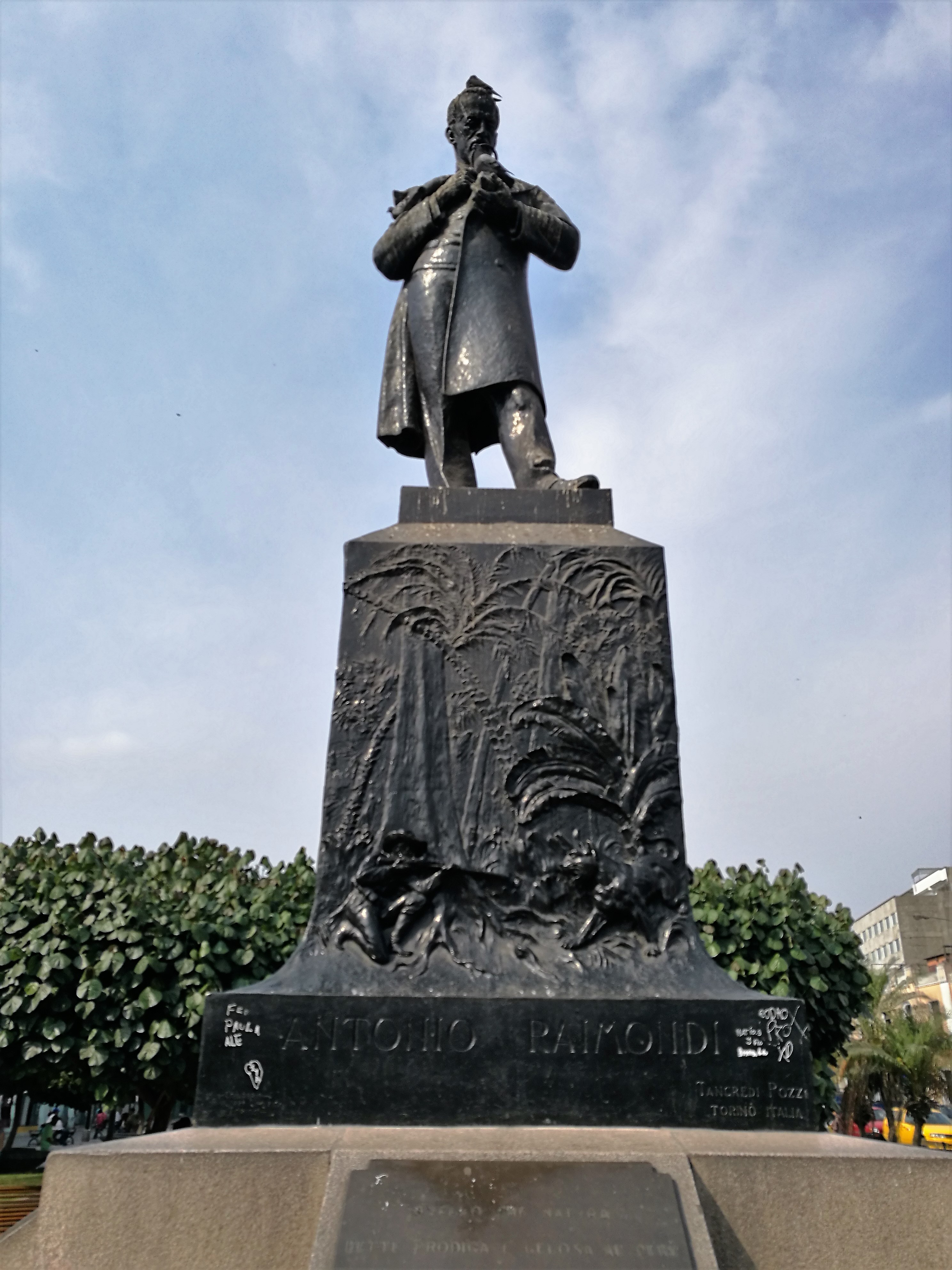
Statue of Antonio Raimondi

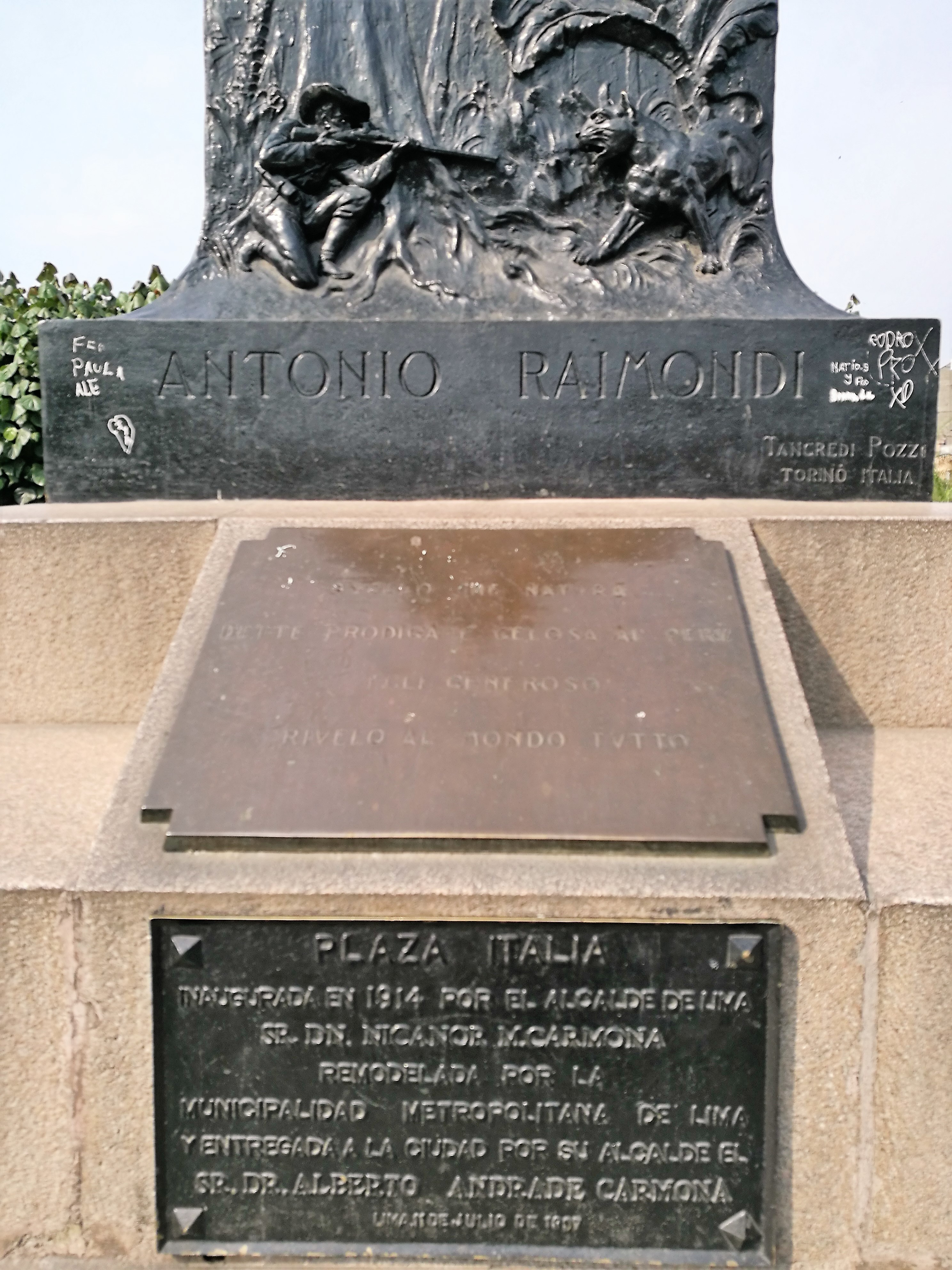
Detail of the statue's base

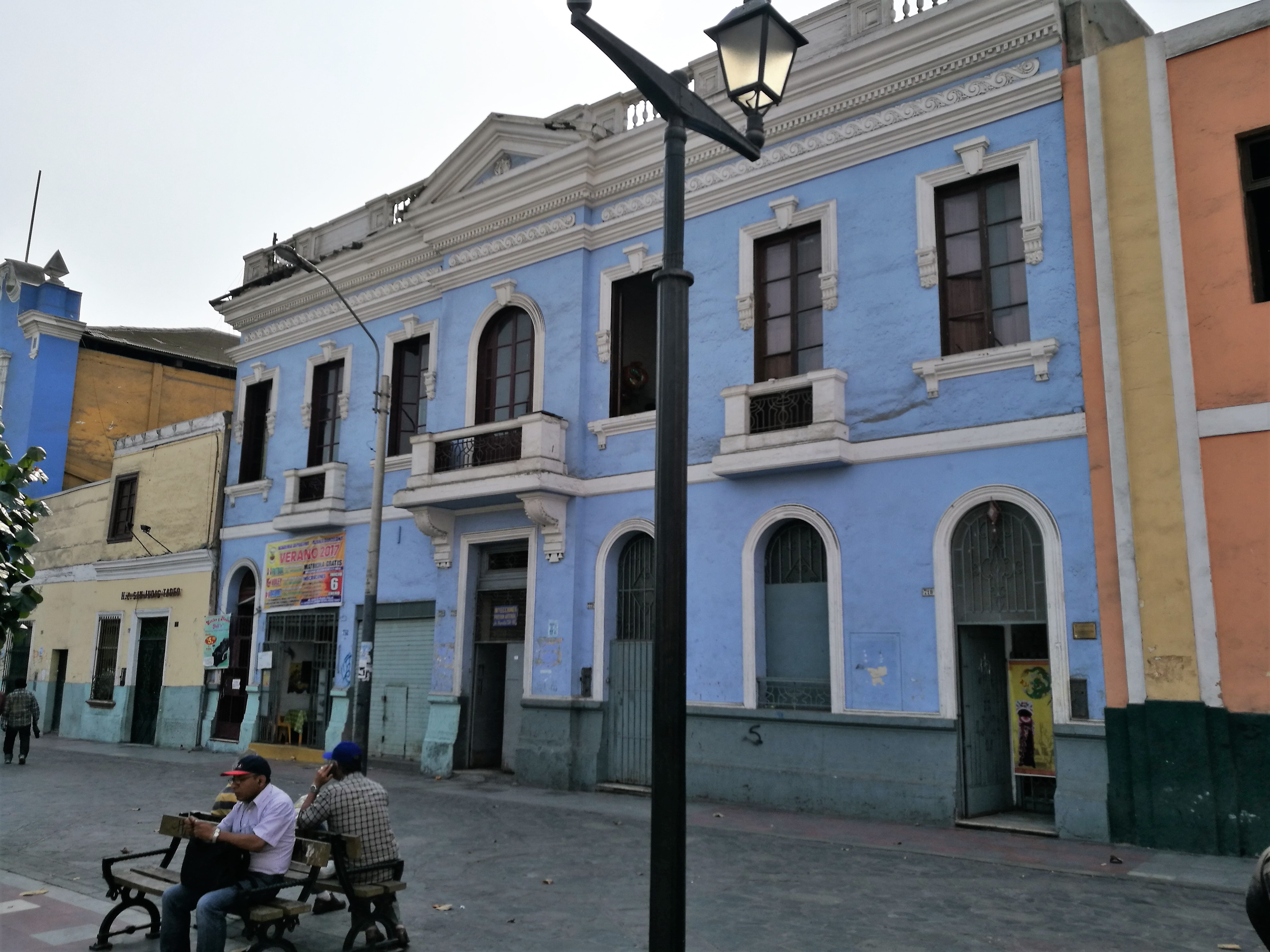
Surroundings of the square

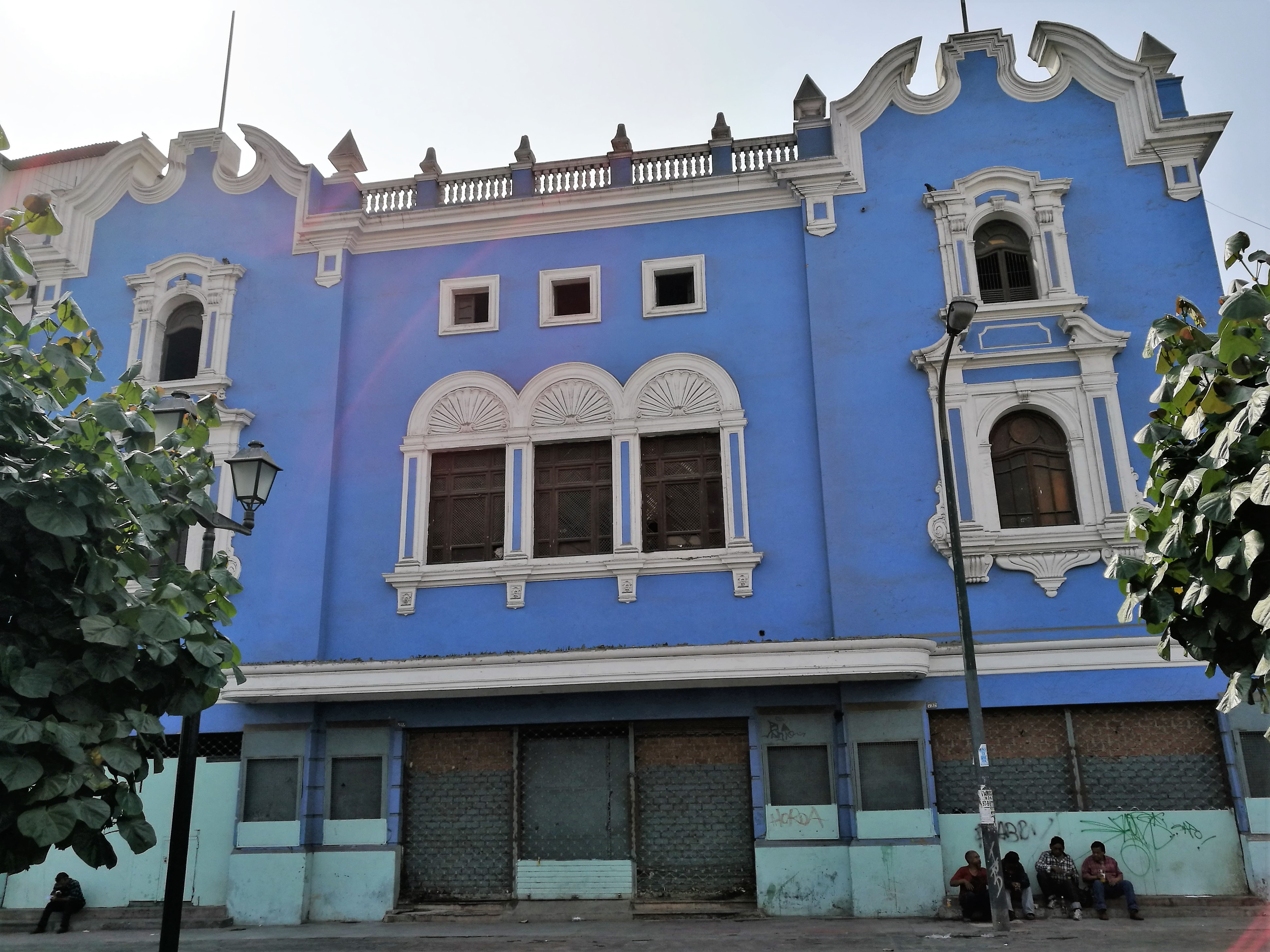
Ditto.

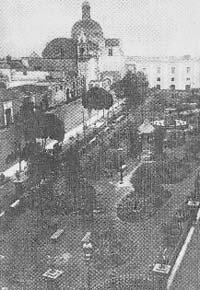
19th century view of the square

== See also ==
- Italian Peruvians
- Plaza Mayor, Lima
- Plaza Bolívar, Lima
- Plazoleta de la Merced
