= Barrios Altos =

Neighbourhood in Peru

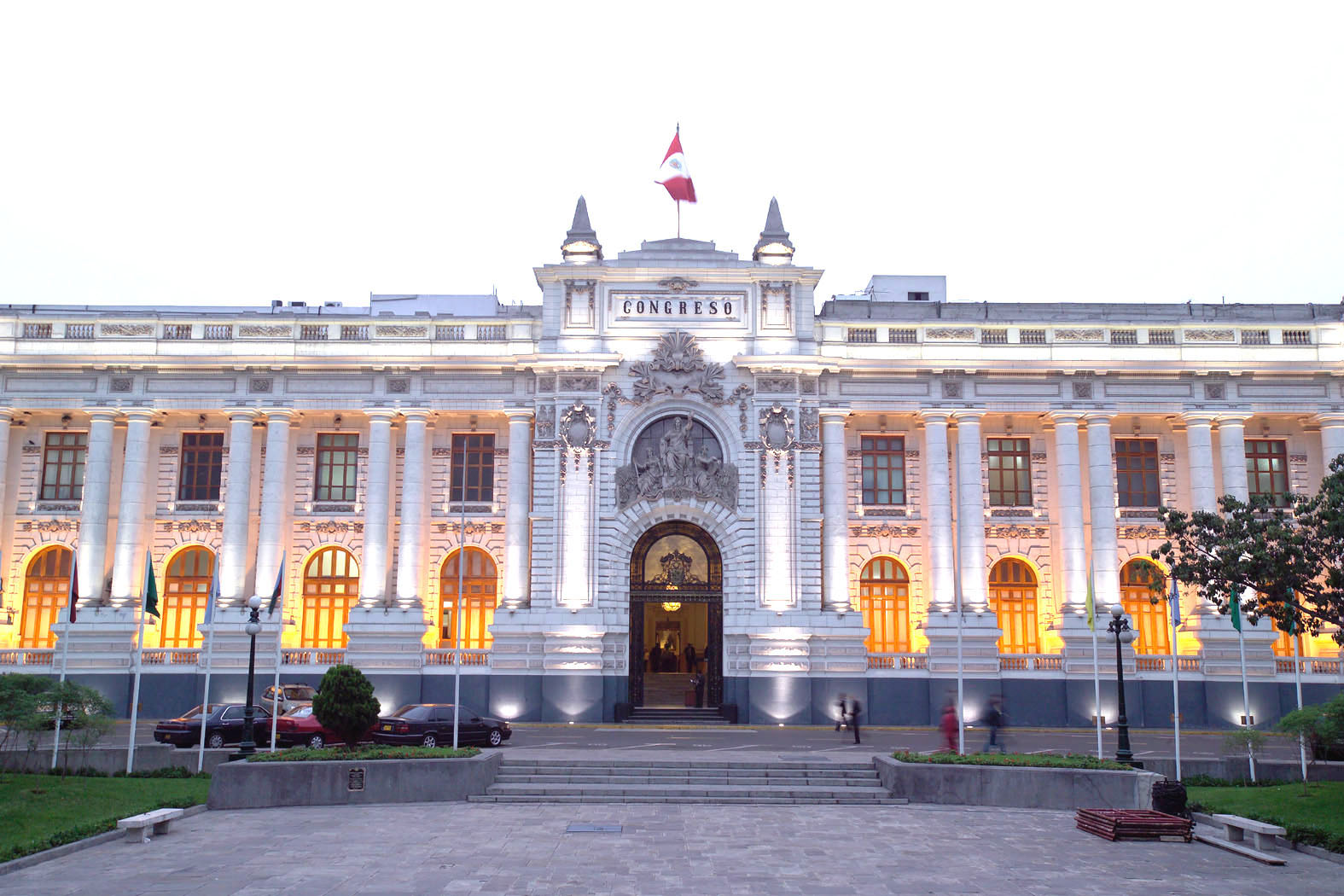
- Front view of the Legislative Palace as seen from the Plaza Bolívar
- Interactive map of Barrios Altos
- Country: Peru
- Department: Lima
- Province: Lima
- District: Lima

Barrios Altos (Note: Spanish for "Upper neighbourhoods." IPA: [ˌba.rjos ˈal̪.t̪os]) is a neighbourhood which forms the eastern part of Lima District, part of the historic centre of the Peruvian city of Lima. It owes its name to the fact that, topographically, it is higher than the rest of the old part of the City, due to the elevation of the land that exists towards the Andes mountain range, which is evident in its streets to this day. It is located east of Abancay Avenue.

Despite its historical significance, the neighbourhood, in comparison to the Cercado de Lima, is in poor shape, as many buildings' façades are not maintained and the collapse of buildings in the area results in the terrains becoming abandoned instead of rebuilt. As a result, a project targeting the area has been announced by PROLIMA, the entity in charge of the project under the auspices of the Ministry of Culture and the Municipality of Lima.

== History ==
=== Pre-Columbian era ===
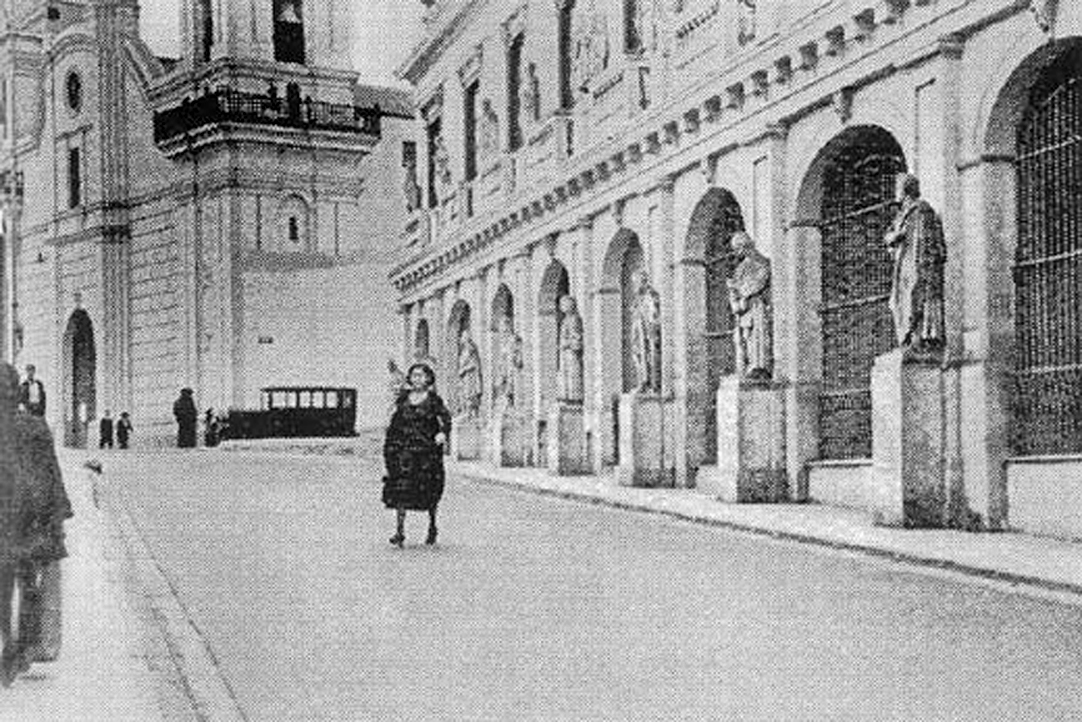
St. Claire's Monastery (and mill). This mill ran on water from the Huatica River, which was, in reality, a pre-Hispanic irrigation canal.

The earliest mention of what is today Barrios Altos dates back to the first years of the Spanish presence in the Andes, through which the religious character that Barrios Altos held during the Inca hegemony in the Rímac Valley can be inferred. The documentation bequeathed to the present by the priests who directed the process of "Extirpation of Idolatries" tells us that an oracle was located in its vicinity, which due to its importance and prestige ended up giving its name to the valley and, over time, to the current capital city of Peru.

The oracle, which is believed to have links with that of Pachacámac located a few leagues to the south, identified in pre-Hispanic times the valley in which it was located, which was called Limay (in Quechua "place where people speak", referring to the speaking property of the oracle). Limay was the name that the Rímac valley had when the Spanish arrived, and which became Lima, a name that ended up being imposed on what was then the Ciudad de los Reyes.

Very little remains of this ancient pre-Hispanic religious centre. The oracle was destroyed by the extirpaters of idolatries. However, a huanca or stone nestled in the sidewalk that has a perforation as a characteristic remains to this day on the corner of Jirón Junín and Jirón Cangallo. Because of this it is called the Piedra Horadada and it is the only remains of the once prestigious oracle.

Another evidence of the Andean Civilization in the current Barrios Altos is the so-called Huatica River. This river, which is actually a canal, is a work of pre-Hispanic engineering in the Rímac valley that had the objective of expanding the agricultural barrier of the valley by transporting the river waters to distant fields. This expansive policy was applied in the valley since the Huari presence in the area (sixth century AD), a period from which the Huatica would date. Its course included the surroundings of the oracle, possibly being part of its water support. The Huatica was alive during the viceregal and republican era, when it was part of the urban landscape and above all an important irrigation canal, until the 20th century when it dried up due to urban expansion and the decrease in the flow of the Rímac River. Its structures are still found under the streets of the Barrios Altos.

=== Viceregal era ===
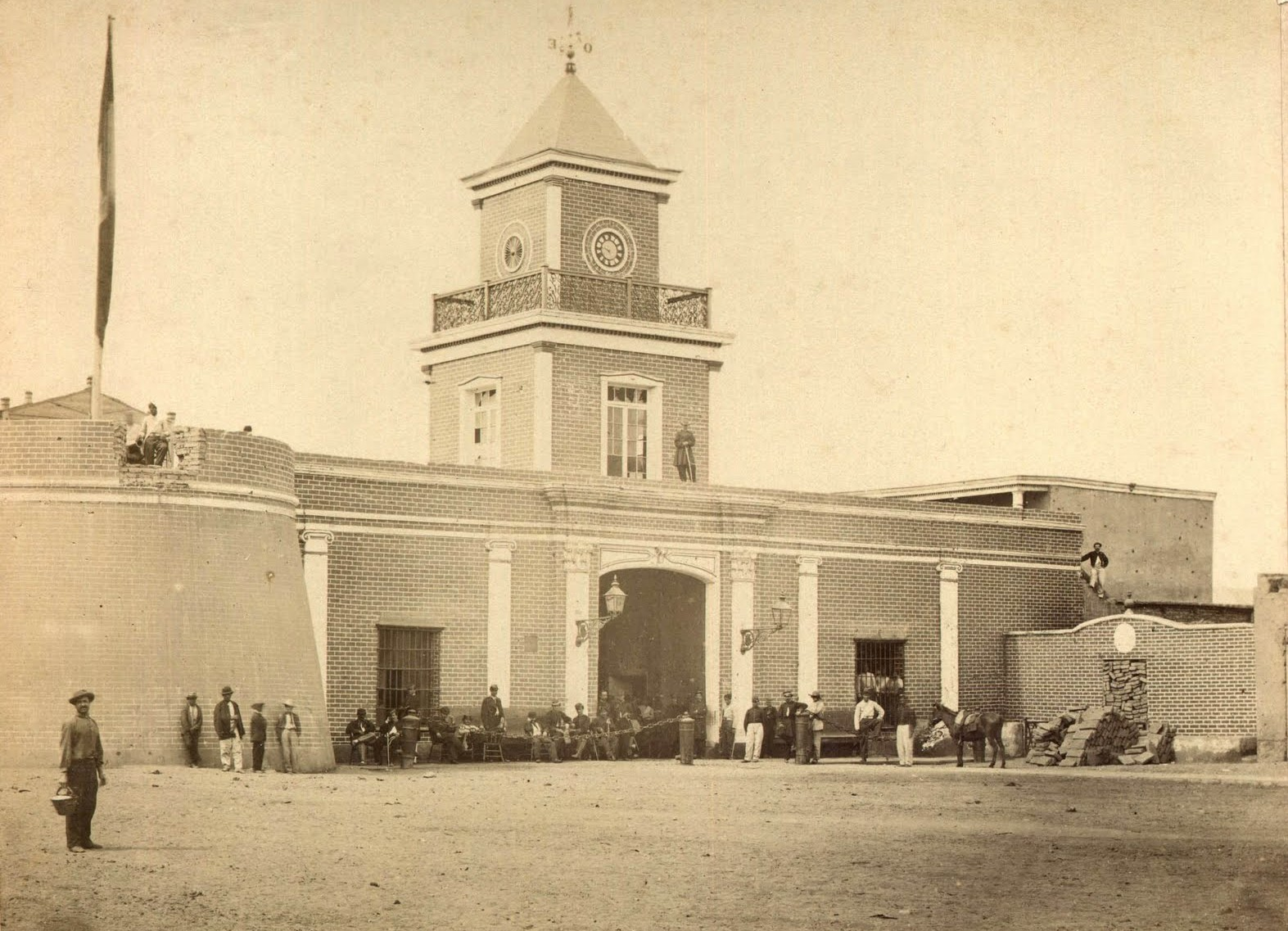
The Viceregal Fort of Santa Catalina, former Artillery and Military Police Barracks, in 1870.

When the Spanish founded the city in January 1535 in the Rímac valley, they did so less than a kilometre from the oracle that gave its name to the valley. Therefore, in a few years the expanding city included its surroundings. In the mid-16th century the oracle was destroyed, and a church was built in its place in dedication to Saint Anne. In the urban layout of the area, some pre-Hispanic vestiges were preserved, such as the Huatica River, which was an ancient irrigation canal. and which currently corresponds to Amazonas and Jauja streets. Soon, the eastern sector of the city, built around the church, received the name Barrio de Santa Ana, the origin of today's Barrios Altos.

In 1571, Viceroy Francisco de Toledo decreed the creation of reduction towns throughout the Andean space, where the indigenous population should live to favor their control and evangelisation. Thus, to the east of the Santa Ana neighbourhood, the town of Santiago del Cercado was built, a reduction (Note: A population centre in which dispersed indigenous people were grouped, for the purposes of evangelisation and cultural assimilation.) for the indigenous people of the City of the Kings. The reduction owed its name to the fact that it was dedicated to the apostle Santiago and was surrounded by a fence that had a single door for the entry and exit of its population. This gate was located in the current Cinco Esquinas of Barrios Altos.

With the construction of the Walls of Lima, part of Santiago del Cercado was destroyed and with it its perimeter wall, becoming integrated into the walled city next to the Santa Ana neighbourhood. From the union of both came what is currently known as Barrios Altos.

Historically, it could be said that the area, during the viceregal era, was occupied mainly by churches and the orchards and farms that belonged to the different religious orders, as can be seen on the maps of the time.

=== Republican era ===
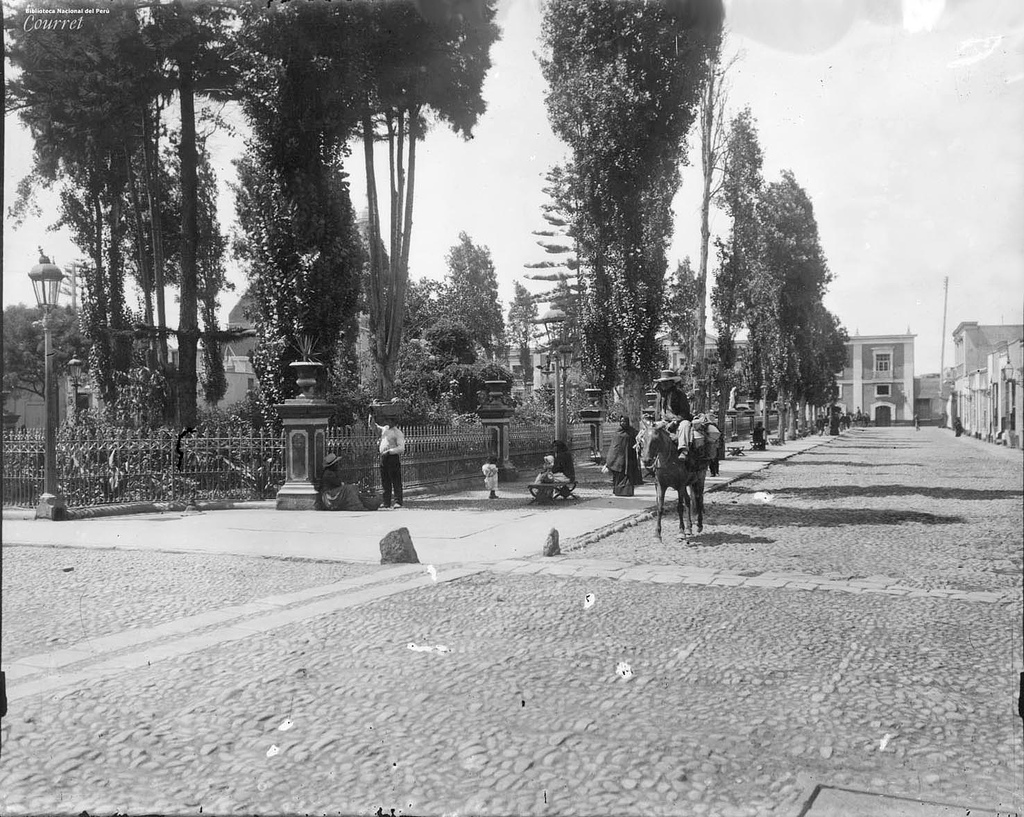
Image of Saint Anne's Square around 1900.

Only in the middle of the 19th century, the area began to be populated in its large extent (although already at the end of the 18th century, 40% of the city's population lived in the Barrios Altos), with the central market emerging there, for example, on land that had belonged to the Convent of La Concepción. In the second half of the 19th century, a number of villas emerged, such as Quinta Heeren (built around 1880) and neighbourhoods such as: El Cercado (the oldest, whose origin dates back to around 1571), El Prado, Del Chirimoyo, Pampa de Lara, Cocharcas, Martinete, etc.

It can be said that the best time for the Barrios Altos was between the end of the 18th century and the first half of the 20th century, when this area did not have problems with crime, robberies and assaults, drug sellers and users, gangs and street sellers. The so-called Plaza de Viterbo (current block 3 of Jirón Amazonas) then stood out, located next to the Balta Bridge and in whose vicinity there was a cinema (Novedades, later called Cinelandia), the Railway station Lima-Lurín and the station of Line No. 7 of the Lima Tramway (a route that was closed in 1928). Currently, the Plaza de Viterbo only remains in the memory of some elderly residents, since the place was completely modified (currently there are sports slabs and the "Amazonas" fairground where used books are sold). The area surrounding the square was also characterized by the existence of viceregal buildings, converted into slums, that ran down from the ravines to the banks of the Rímac River. All of these slums, such as the old Hotel Amazonas which over the years became a slum known as the House of Dracula, were destroyed in the early 1970s with an unfinished plan to modernize the area.

Until the 1960s there were a good number of cinema-theatres, of which they survived until the first five years of the 1980s: the Conde de Lemos, located in the Plazuela de Buenos Aires, Delicias, located in front of the Maternidad de Lima, the Pizarro and Unión both located in Plaza Italia. Today none of these exist due to the decline that the area reached.

=== Decadence ===
The district, despite its importance, has become dilapidated over time. One such example is a three-storey building known as El Buque after its resemblance to a ship, built in the 19th century in a 1,131 m^{2} plot and located in the corners of jirones Junín and Cangallo, declared part of the Cultural heritage of Peru. Originally sporting marble staircases with bronze handrails and wooden balconies, it was built with the purpose of being the first housing complex after independence, being able to house 70 families in total. It has since been declared inhabitable, the result of a series of fires in 2012, 2014, 2016 and 2022 that neighbours blame on the drug addicts that sneak into the building through a hole made in a wall.

== Landmarks ==
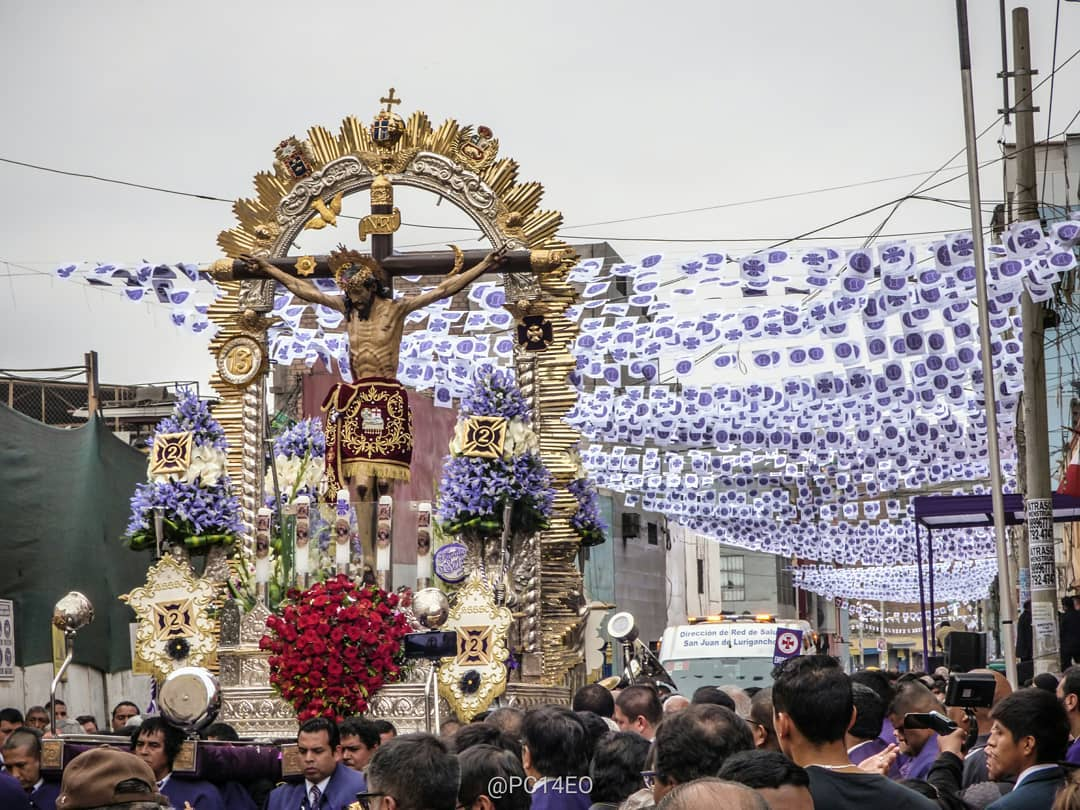
Lord of Miracles festivities in 2020

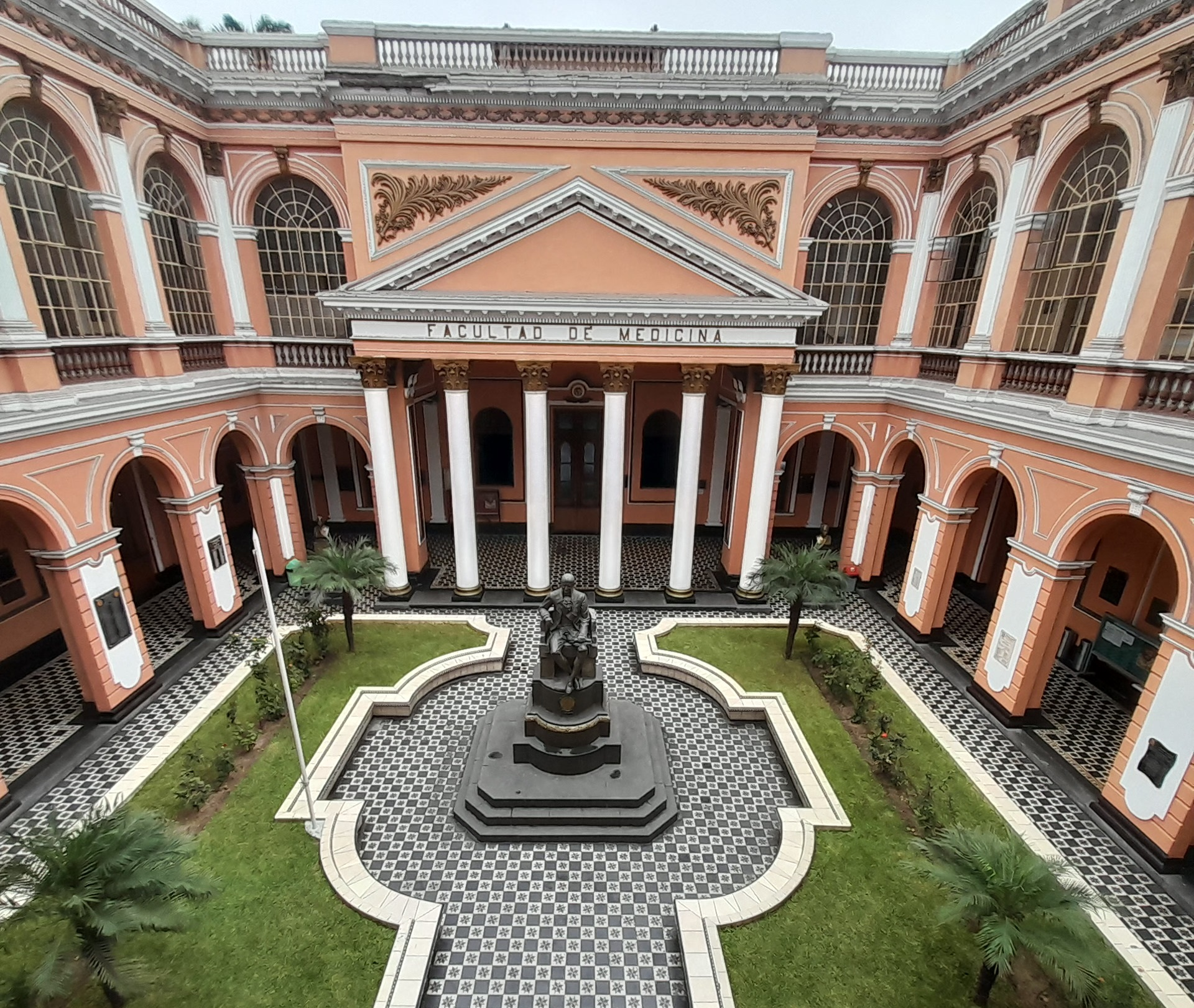
San Marcos' Faculty of Medicine

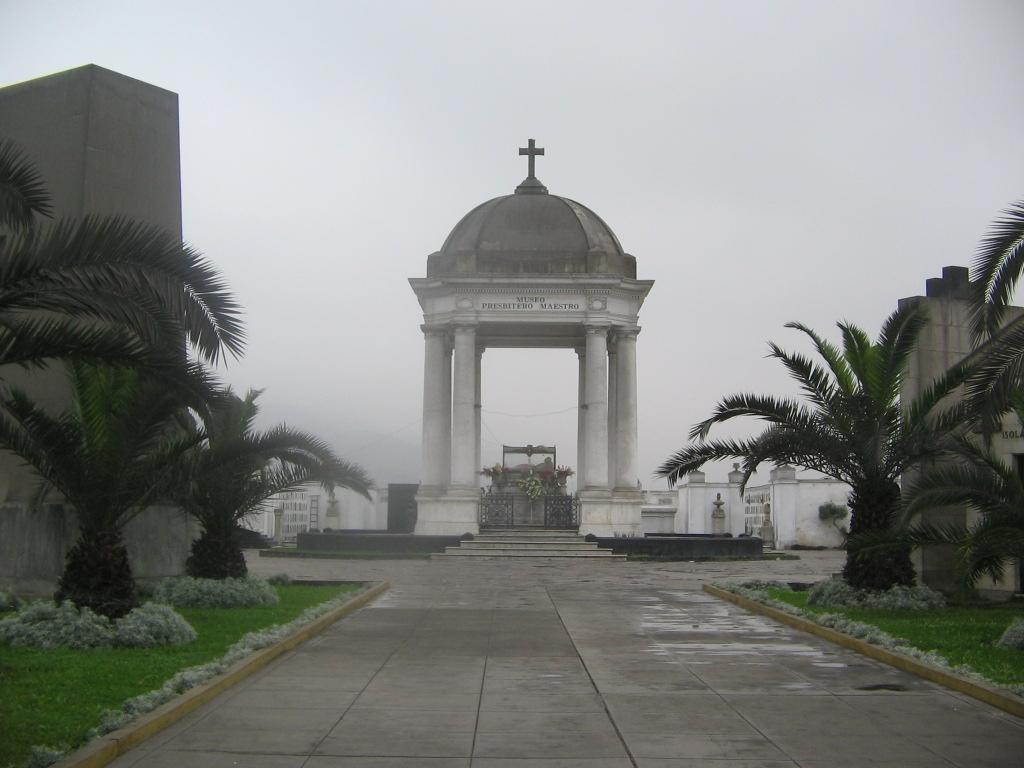
Matías Maestro Cemetery chapel

Barrios Altos is home to a number of landmarks from both the Spanish and Republican era, including:

- The building of the National Superior Autonomous School of Fine Arts
- The Legislative Palace, home of the Congress of Peru
- The Museum of Congress and the Inquisition
- The Library of Congress of Peru
- The Cuartel Barbones military barracks, hosting two museums on its premises
- San Vicente and Ruiz Dávila Hospices
- The Plazuela del Cercado, known for its statues and its church, the Church of Santiago del Cercado.
- The Monastery of the Immaculate Conception
- The house of Felipe Pinglo Alva
- A number of quintas, such as the Quinta Carbone, the Quinta Heeren, the Quinta San José, the Quinta Baselli, the Quinta Candamo (named after former president Manuel Candamo), the Quinta del Prado (known for being the meeting place of Micaela Villegas and Manuel de Amat)
- The botanic garden of Lima
- The Peña Horadada
- The faculties of Medicine and Biochemistry of the National University of San Marcos
- The Royal College of the University of San Marcos
- Mercedes Cabello de Carbonera College
- The Museum of the Brain of the National Institute of Neurological Sciences.
- The Church of the Holy Christ of Wonders
- The city's two main cemeteries: Presbítero Maestro and El Ángel
- The Church of Our Lady of Mount Carmel
- Remains of the Walls of Lima, such as the remains in Santa Lucía
- The building of the Third Order of Saint Francis, integrated with the convent of the same name until the 1950s
- The Casa Canevaro, named after Peruvian general César Canevaro
- The Casa de las Trece Monedas, which houses the National Afro-Peruvian Museum
- The former Fort of Santa Catalina
- The former Santo Tomás de la Santísima Trinidad Theology School
- The Monastery and Mill of Saint Clare
- Chinatown, location of a monumental gate and a number of Chinese restaurants and shops
- Commerce centres, such as Mesa Redonda and the Central Market

== See also ==
- Historic Centre of Lima
- Cercado de Lima
