= Balta Bridge =

Bridge in Lima, Peru

Balta Bridge Puente Balta
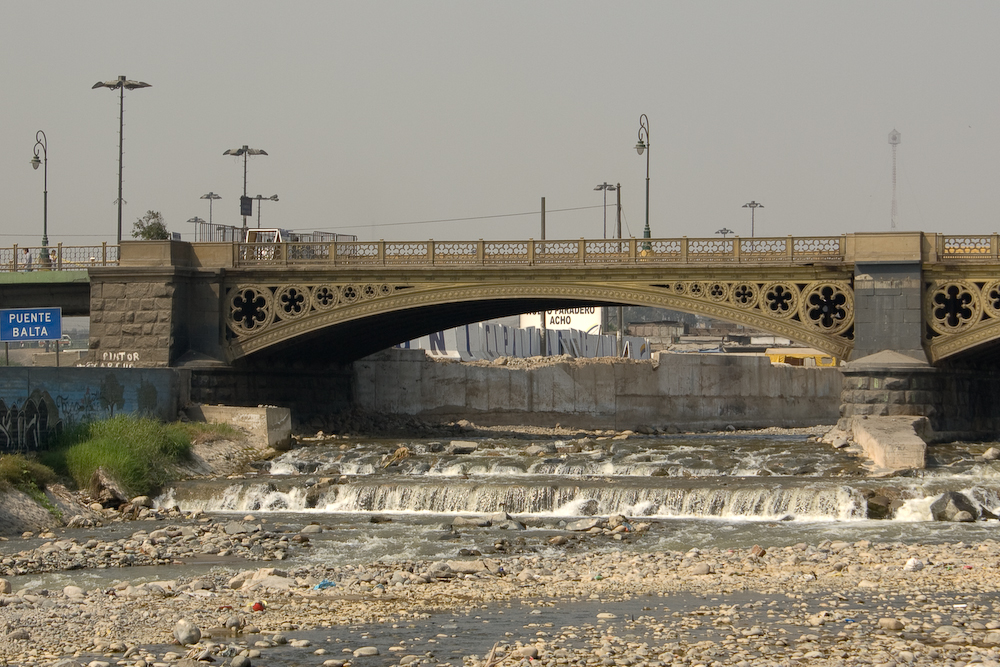
- The bridge in 2009
- Coordinates: 12°02′37″S 77°01′23″W
- Crosses: Rímac river
- Begins: Jirón Amazonas
- Ends: Avenida 9 de Octubre
- Named for: José Balta

History
- Architect: Felipe Arancibia
- Construction start: 1869
- Construction end: 1919
- Construction cost: S/. 300,000

Balta Bridge (Spanish: Puente Balta), also known as the Iron Bridge (Spanish: Puente de Fierro) is an iron bridge, the first of its kind in the city of Lima, that crosses the Rímac river, connecting the Jirón Amazonas to the south and the Avenida 9 de Octubre to the north.

== History ==
The studies for the construction of a bridge over the Rímac river began under the third interim government of Pedro Diez Canseco (1868). Until then, the only bridge that connected the city of Lima with the Rímac neighbourhood was the Puente de Piedra, from the colonial era.

The matter deserved public attention and there was debate about the place of its construction and the material to be used. The project took shape in 1869 under the government of José Balta, which called for a public competition for interested businessmen to present their proposals. The design presented by engineer Felipe Arancibia and businessman Enrique Armero was the winner.

=== Construction ===
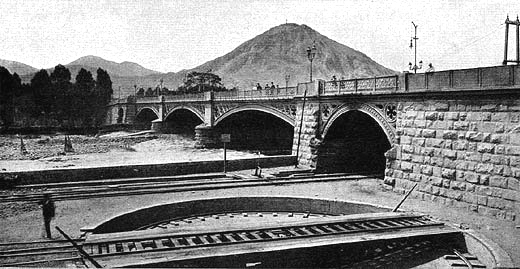
Undated photograph

The place chosen for its construction was located in front of the Plaza de Acho, known as La Barranca, an area used as a midden. The bridge would be an extension of San Ildefonso Street, then called Talavera Street, which currently corresponds to the first block of the jirón Andahuaylas.

Armero commissioned the casting and pre-assembly of the bridge to the Boigues Rambourgs Coe factory in France. The structure was made up of three cast iron arches, supported by stone pillars, and spandrels with details in the Italian neo-Romanesque style.

There was, however, the problem that, since the river was not channelised, it tended to invade the surrounding lands, which were used as crop fields or remained as swampy lands, which affected public health. The problem was solved by channeling the river in the area between Piedra Liza and Puente de Piedra, and the area called Martinete, building a large wall with lime and stone masonry for this purpose.

Another problem presented was that the engineers did not calculate the difference in height between Lima and Rímac, so they had to make a ramp on the side of the bridge that faced Acho. This forced the removal of the monument to Christopher Columbus that was in the Acho oval, at the end of the Alameda of the same name. The total work cost about S/. 300,000.

On March 19, 1869, the first stone of the work was laid, a ceremony in which President José Balta and his ministers participated, as well as the prefect of the department, and some foreign consuls. Many local citizens were also present. After the inauguration, a large celebration parade was held, which culminated in a large banquet held at the Tivoli playground, located in the Piedra Liza baths. Known then as the Iron Bridge, over time it became known by its current name.

The original structure was manufactured in the workshops of the French firm Boignes Rambourgs and its installation was directed by the engineer Felipe Arancivia. The closing of the first arch took place in October 1871.

During the occupation of Lima (1881) the bridge was the scene of a little-known historical event. With the city already occupied by the Chileans, two Peruvian soldiers, Manuel Hilarión Roldán and Manuel Guerra, met a Chilean soldier from the Esmeralda Battalion. They tried to resist, but succumbed to the arrival of the entire enemy contingent, being captured and shot on the same bridge. Their bodies currently rest in the Crypt of the Heroes.

The works concluded in 1919, at the beginning of the government of Augusto B. Leguía.

=== Later history ===
In 1971 the bridge was mutilated when the first arch on the right bank was removed to build the Vía de Evitamiento.

In 2005, under the first municipal administration of Luis Castañeda Lossio, the bridge was rebuilt for the Lima tourist circuit, at a cost of S/. 200,000. Both pedestrian and vehicular passage were opened. On March 14, 2009, the base that supports one of its columns collapsed, as a result of a river flood. The repair work on the pillar and the reinforcement of its foundations took a year and demanded a cost of S/. 5 million from the Municipality of Lima.

But not only the ravages of nature threaten the structure, but also the excesses caused by human action. Several thefts of metal beams and plates from the bridge were detected, material that was sold by weight at a time when the price of metals was on the rise. The municipal government then announced that the bridge would have permanent security.

When the Rímac River flooded during the 2017 coastal Niño, which caused the collapse of many bridges throughout the country, there was a sector of the press that compared the modern structures that succumbed to the onslaught of nature and the old bridges that, like the Balta, resisted it. When consulted about this, the architect Augusto Ortiz de Zevallos pointed out that the resistance of the Balta Bridge and other older ones resided in the starling, a diamond base that divides the river current in two to avoid the impact of the impetuous flow on the columns of the bridge's structure.

== Overview ==
The bridge has five arches, of which the central three are made of cast iron, with spandrels formed by groups of rose windows. In these details and in the quatrefoils on the railings, the bridge shows neo-Gothic influences.

== See also ==
- Puente de Piedra
