= Charity of Lima =

Charitable organisation in Peru

- Beneficencia de Lima
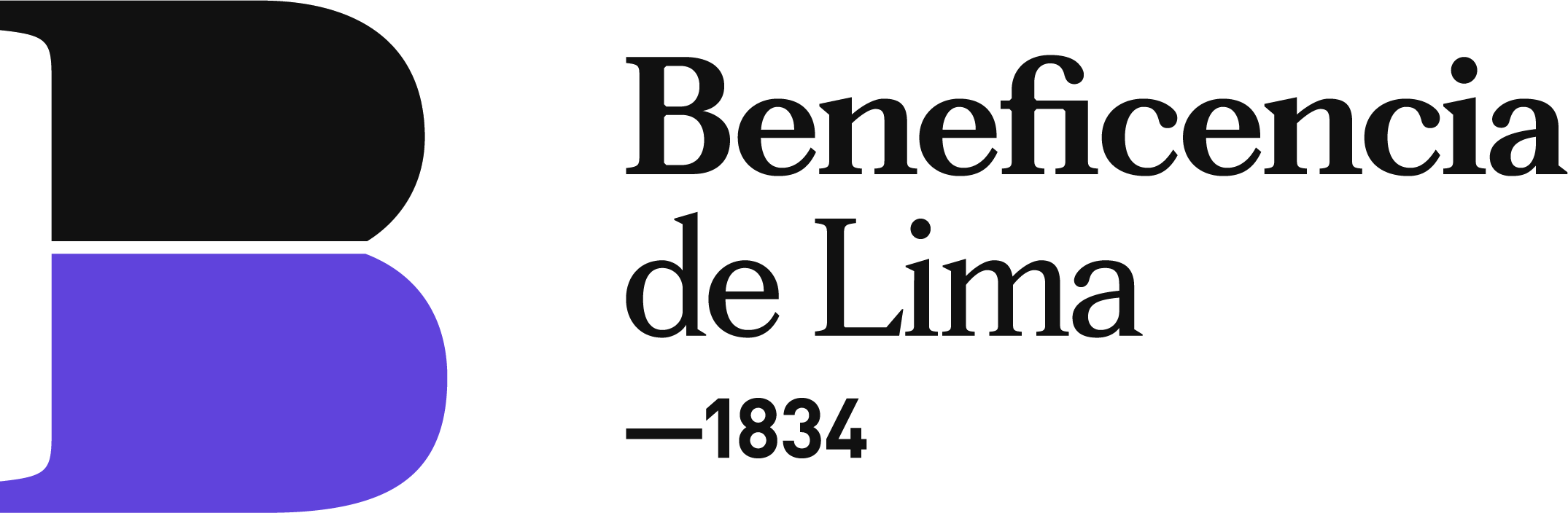

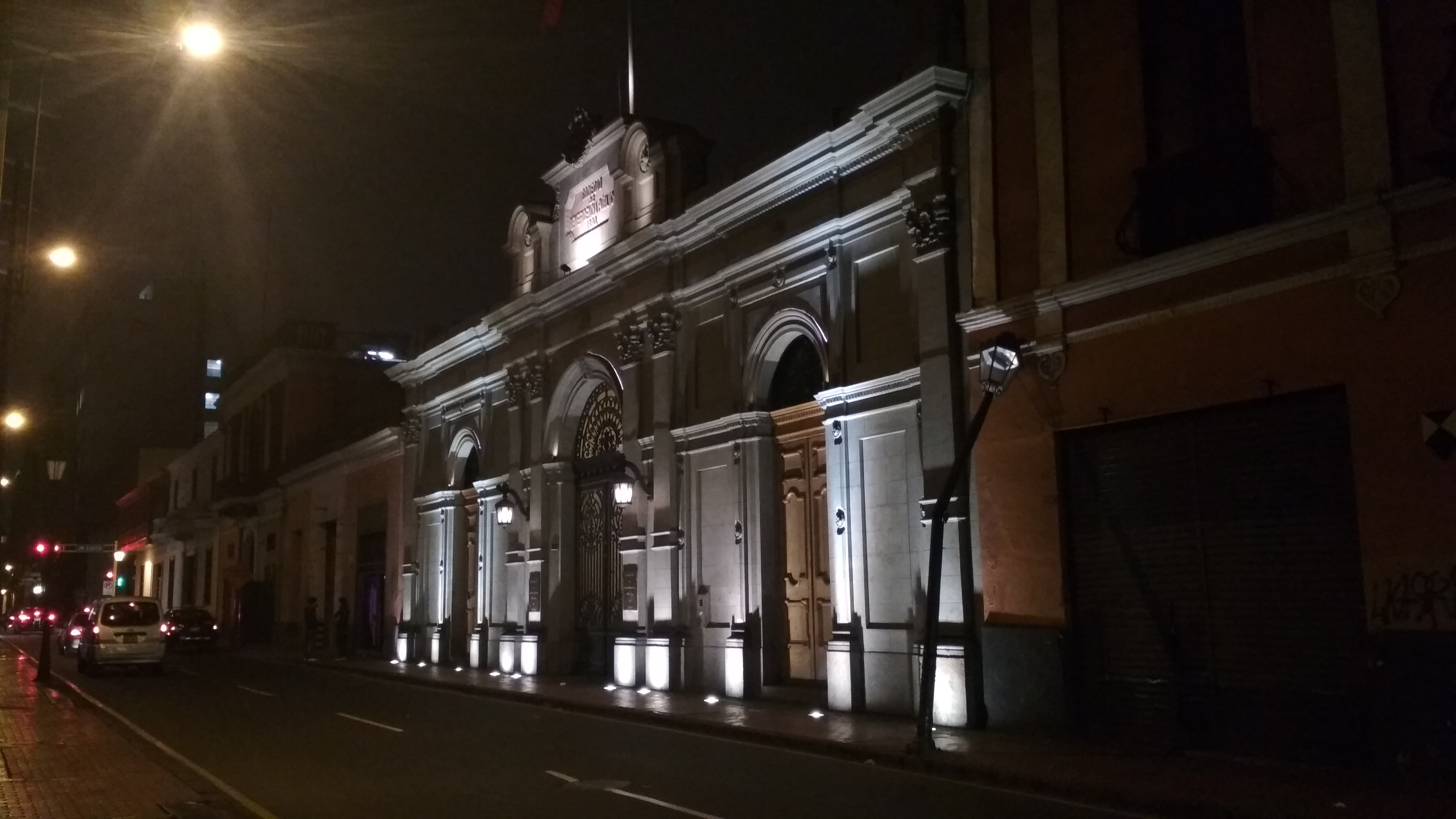
- Headquarters at night

Charitable organisation overview
- Formed: June 12, 1834; 191 years ago
- Headquarters: Jirón Carabaya 641
- Director responsible: Guillermo Ackermann Menacho
- General Manager responsible: Jorge Lafosse Quintana
- Website: www.sblm.gob.pe

The Charity of Lima (Spanish: Beneficencia de Lima), officially the Society of Charity of Metropolitan Lima (Spanish: Sociedad de Beneficencia de Lima Metropolitana), is a charitable organisation that serves the city of Lima, in Peru.

It is headquartered at the Casa de Divorciadas, an 18th-century building in the historic centre of Lima.

== History ==
It was founded on June 12, 1834, through a Supreme Decree of General Luis José de Orbegoso y Moncada, provisional president of Peru. Through the General, it was in charge of the charitable establishments of Lima. This institution was responsible for the first lotteries in the country, the Lima and Callao Lottery.

In 2009, it became a public organisation directly attached to the Ministry of Women and Social Development, after ceasing to be a subsidiary of the National Comprehensive Program for Family Welfare (INABIF) of the same ministry; and later in 2011 it became administered by the Metropolitan Municipality of Lima, after the approval of the Annual Plan for Transfers of Sectoral Competencies to Regional and Local Governments made in 2007.

Since September 13, 2018, by Legislative Decree No. 1411, it becomes a private entity, financed by donations.

In 2020, for its 187th anniversary, the "Live to Serve" campaign was developed for the neediest in the city of Lima. In which it extends to 553 housed in different care centers (175 for minors in the Puericultorio Perez Aranibar and 378 older adults).

== Operational care centres ==
Name	Description
Puericultorio Pérez Araníbar	It is a child care center, created by Augusto Pérez Araníbar, a philanthropic doctor and director of the Charity in 1917. It has psychological assistance. In 1930 it reached 1,500 housed. In 2014 there were 234 guests between 0 and 20 years of age, of which 133 were men and 101 were women.
Hogar Canevaro (Note: Known as the "Hogar Ignacia Rodulfo Vda. de Canevaro" countrywide.)	It provides comprehensive care to elderly people who are victims of abandonment or are vulnerable due to their economic and social situation. It houses around 350 older adults, all of them totally destitute and extremely poor, distributed among 60% men and 40% women.
San Vicente de Paúl	Shelter that is responsible for providing comprehensive service to older adults who are dependent. It has 130 shelters in a situation of abandonment.
Centro Residenciales Gerontológicos	Center that contains three shelters María Castaño, Sagrada Familia and Sagrado Corazón, located in the Centre of Lima and Rímac. Independent, low-income seniors who are mostly indulgent reside within.
Santa Rosa & Santa Teresita soup kitchens	Soup kitchens for boys, girls, adolescents, pregnant mothers, infants, older adults and people with disabilities in situations of poverty and social risk. It serves breakfast and lunch.
Sevilla Institute	Created in December 1891, thanks to the legacy of José Sevilla, it has had the mission of providing education to the vulnerable sector (minors), who due to things in life did not have the financial solvency to be able to carry out their basic studies.
Hogar de la Madre clinic	The institution provides education in primary and secondary grades, offering teaching in line with today's student demands, with minimal cost and quality. It cares for almost 30 thousand pregnant mothers a year, carrying out around 2,200 births annually. This work has been carried out for several decades, with extensive experience in maternal and child health care, providing the best service with high quality standards in Maternal Health.
Casa de Todos	Operated as a temporary shelter in the Plaza de Acho during the COVID-19 pandemic in strategic alliance with the Metropolitan Municipality of Lima to house 150 homeless people.

== Cultural centres ==
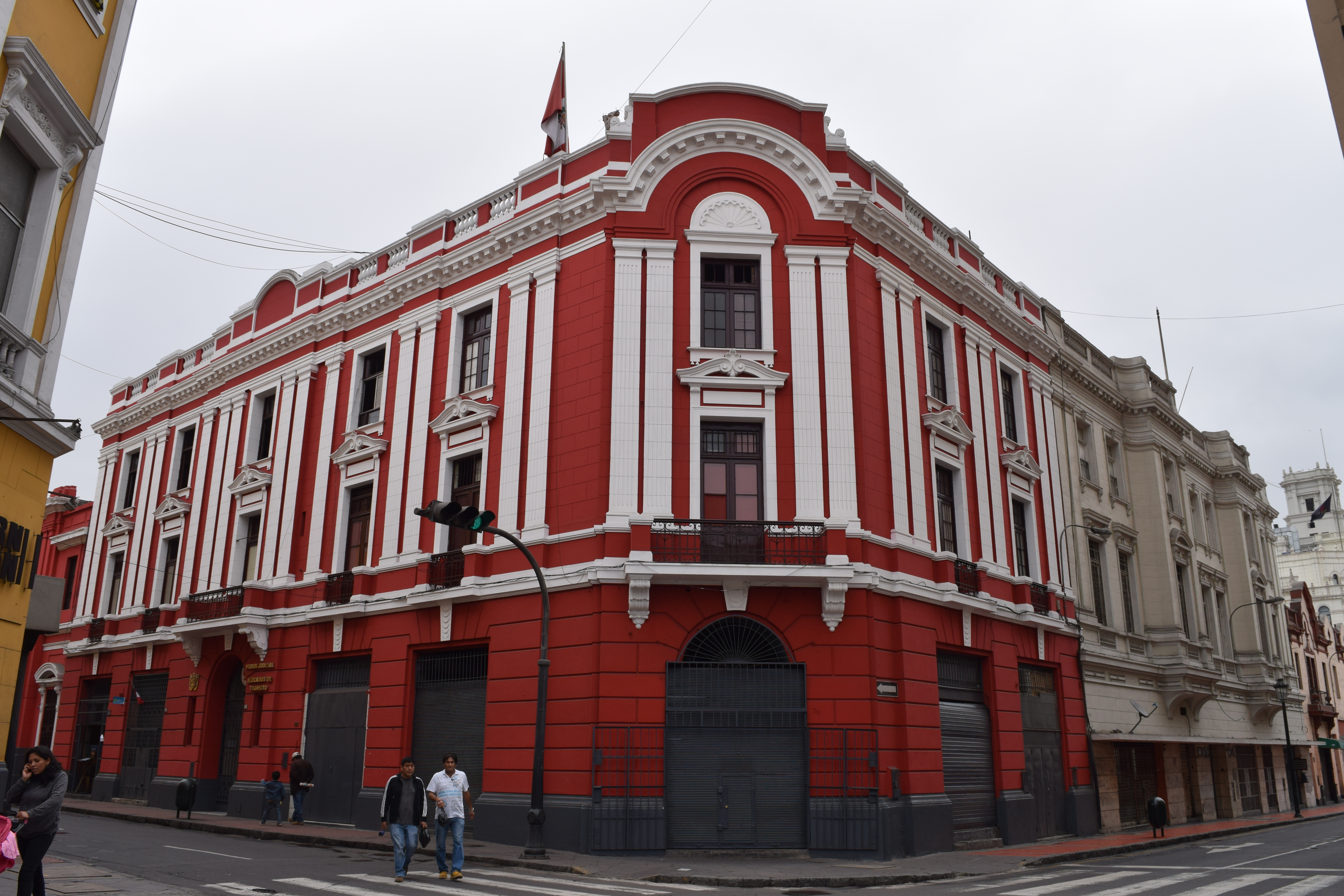
The former lottery headquarters.

In 2020, publicly accessible cultural centres operated in its historical heritage were developed after the approval of the Master Plan for the Recovery of the Historic Center of Lima, led by Prolima. Some of the works in which it participated were in the "Casa de Divorciadas", the main headquarters of the Charity. Subsequently, the conservation of the Presbítero Maestro Cemetery was carried out, and the carrying out of historical activities in its various historical properties such as the Plaza de Acho, the Afro-Peruvian Museum, the Lottery Branch Headquarters, and others.

== List of directors ==
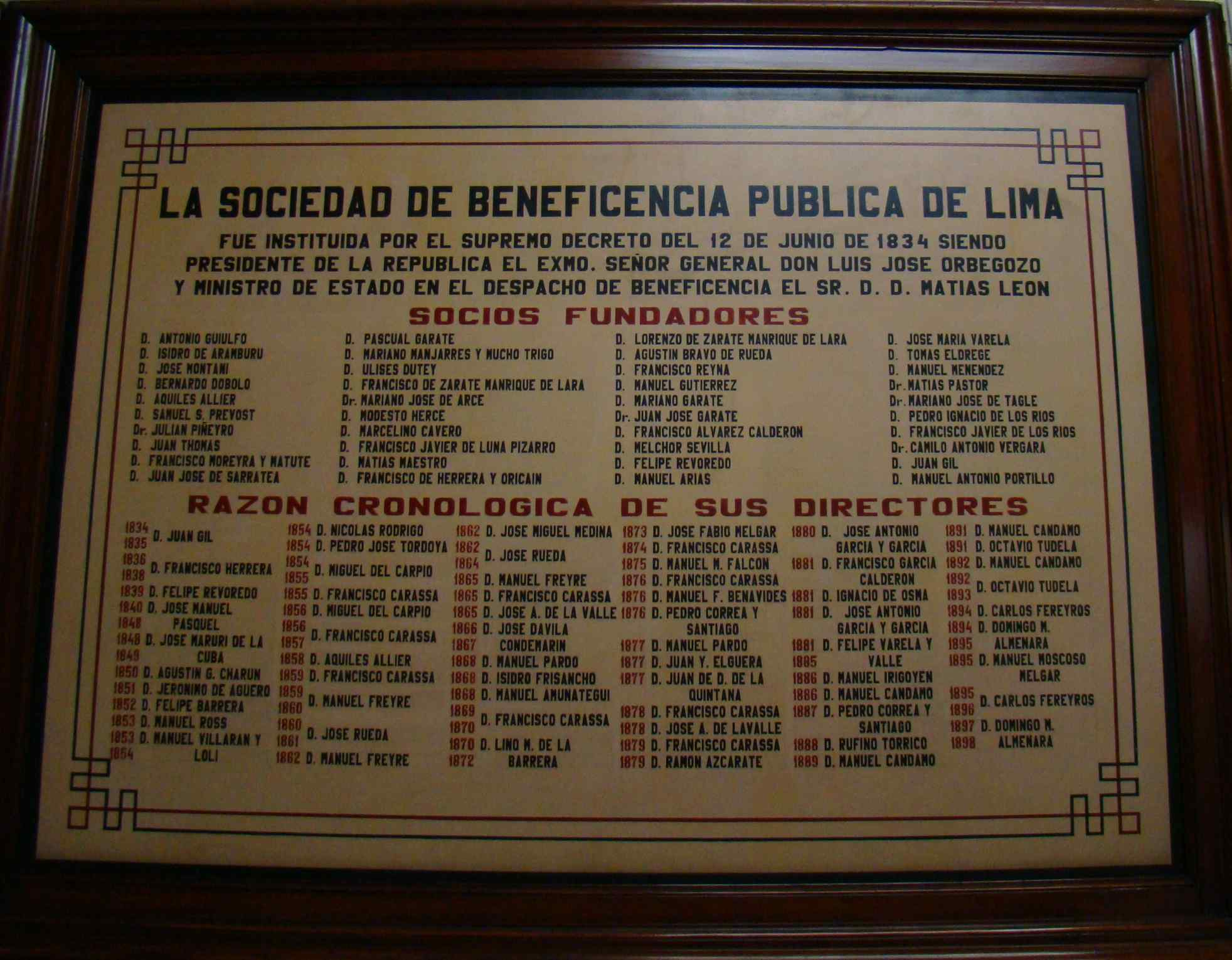
Plaque with founders and directors.

- Domingo de Orué y Mirones
- Antonio F. de Arrieta (1840) (Note: Born in Tarma, nephew of canon José Manuel Bermúdez y Arrieta. He was the one who donated his family's mansion for the headquarters of the current Charity of Lima.)
- Francisco González de Prada Marrón y Lombrera (1857, 1858)
- José Antonio de Lavalle y Arias de Saavedra (1865).
- Manuel Pardo y Lavalle (1868).
- Manuel Francisco Benavides Canduelas (1872)
- José Antonio García y García (1880, 1881)
- Ignacio de Osma y Ramírez de Arellano (1882)
- Manuel Yrigoyen Arias (1886)
- Rufino Torrico (1887)
- Manuel Candamo e Iriarte (1890).
- Domingo Olavegoya Yriarte (1903)
- Domingo M. Almenara Butler (1907, 1908)
- Carlos Larrabure y Correa (1909)
- Agustín Tovar Aguilar (1909, 1910)
- José Antonio Miró Quesada (1911, 1912)
- Augusto N. Wiese Eslava
- Augusto Pérez Araníbar (1916, 1918)
- Pedro García Yrigoyen (1932, 1933)
- Inés Young Samanez (1989)
- Romelia Vera La Rosa (1990)
- Victoria Paredes Sánchez
- Fernando Luis Arias-Stella Castillo
- Jorge Esteban Pinedo Del Águila

== List of presidents ==
- José Cabero y Salazar (1825)
- Manuel Pardo y Lavalle (1868)
- Manuel Candamo Iriarte
- Carlos Larrabure y Correa (1909)
- Hernando de Lavalle y García (1940)
- Pedro García Yrigoyen (1942–1945)
- Rollin Thorne Sologuren (1948–1950)
- Miguel Dasso Drago (1951)
- Eleodoro Romana y Romaña (1951–1954)
- Oswaldo Hercelles García (1954–1961)
- Carlos Monge Medrano (1963)
- Carlos Velarde Cabello (1963–1968)
- Oscar Urteaga Ballón
- Pedro Vicente Li Vera (1989–1990)
- Manuel de la Peña y Angulo (1991–1994)
- Eduardo Zapata Salazar
- Víctor Hugo Bolaños Velarde (2000–2001)
- Enrique Horna Alegría (2001–2004)
- Ernesto Javier Ponce Gastelumendi (2004–2005)
- Humberto Enrique Hernández Schulz (2005–2006)
- Manuel Eguiguren Callirgos (2006–2007)
- Miriam Correa Briones (2007–2008)
- Carlos Serapio Rivas Dávila (2008–2009)
- Dennis Eduardo Zúñiga Luy (2009–2010)
- Josefina Estrada Mesinas de Capriatta (2011–2012)
- Carlos José Otero Bonicelli (2012–2013)
- María del Carmen Vásquez de Velasco Vásquez de Velasco (2013–2015)
- Martín Marcial Bustamante Castro (2015–2018)
- Guillermo Ackermann Menacho (2019–present)

== See also ==
- Cementerio Presbítero Matías Maestro
- Plaza de toros de Acho
- El Ángel Cemetery
