= National Order of San Lorenzo =

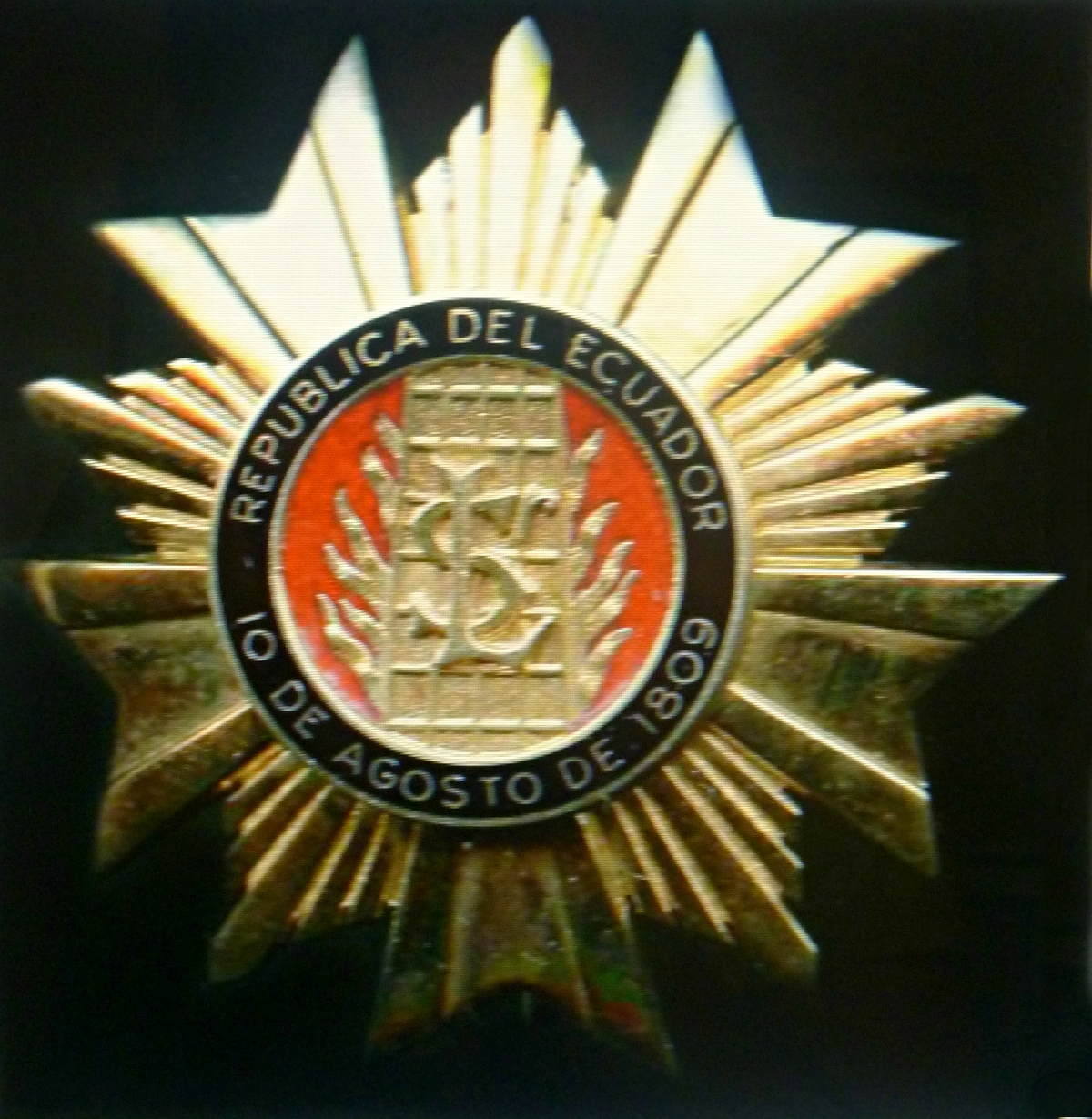
- Grand Cross of the San Lorenzo Order.

Awarded by Ecuador
- Type: Order
- Awarded for: Extraordinary civil merit.
- Status: Currently constituted
- Sovereign: President of Ecuador
- Grades: Grand Collar; Grand Cross; Grand Officer

Statistics
- First induction: 17 August 1809

Precedence
- Next (higher): None
- Next (lower): National Order of Merit
- Ribbon bar of the order.

The National Order of San Lorenzo was established as a military order medal by the President of the First Revolutionary Government of Quito, Juan Pío Montúfar, II Marquis de Selva Alegre, by a decree issued on August 17, 1809, in the Capitulate Hall of the Convent of San Agustín. All the members of the revolutionary Council were decorated with it. Once the Council disappeared and the power returned to Spanish hands, the Order also ceased for more than a century.

It was restored by Ecuadorian President Camilo Ponce Enríquez on August 10, 1959. Finally the law was restructured on June 4 of 2001, during the government of president Gustavo Noboa Bejarano. Currently it is the highest award granted in Ecuador, both in civil and military fields.

== Insignia ==
The ribbon is red with black edges.

== Notable recipients ==
- Albert II of Belgium: Grand Collar of the Order
- Juan Carlos I of Spain : Grand Collar of the Order (13 May 1980)
- Queen Sofía of Spain : Grand Cross of the Order (13 May 1980)
- Felipe, Prince of Asturias : Grand Cross of the Order (9 July 2001)
- Tabaré Vázquez : Grand Collar of the Order (7 September 2010)
- José Mujica, President of Uruguay 2010-2015: Grand Collar of the Order (3 December 2014)

== Sources and references ==
World Medals Index, Ecuador: National Order of San Lorenzo
