= Paseo de Aguas =

Park in Lima

- Paseo de la Carbona
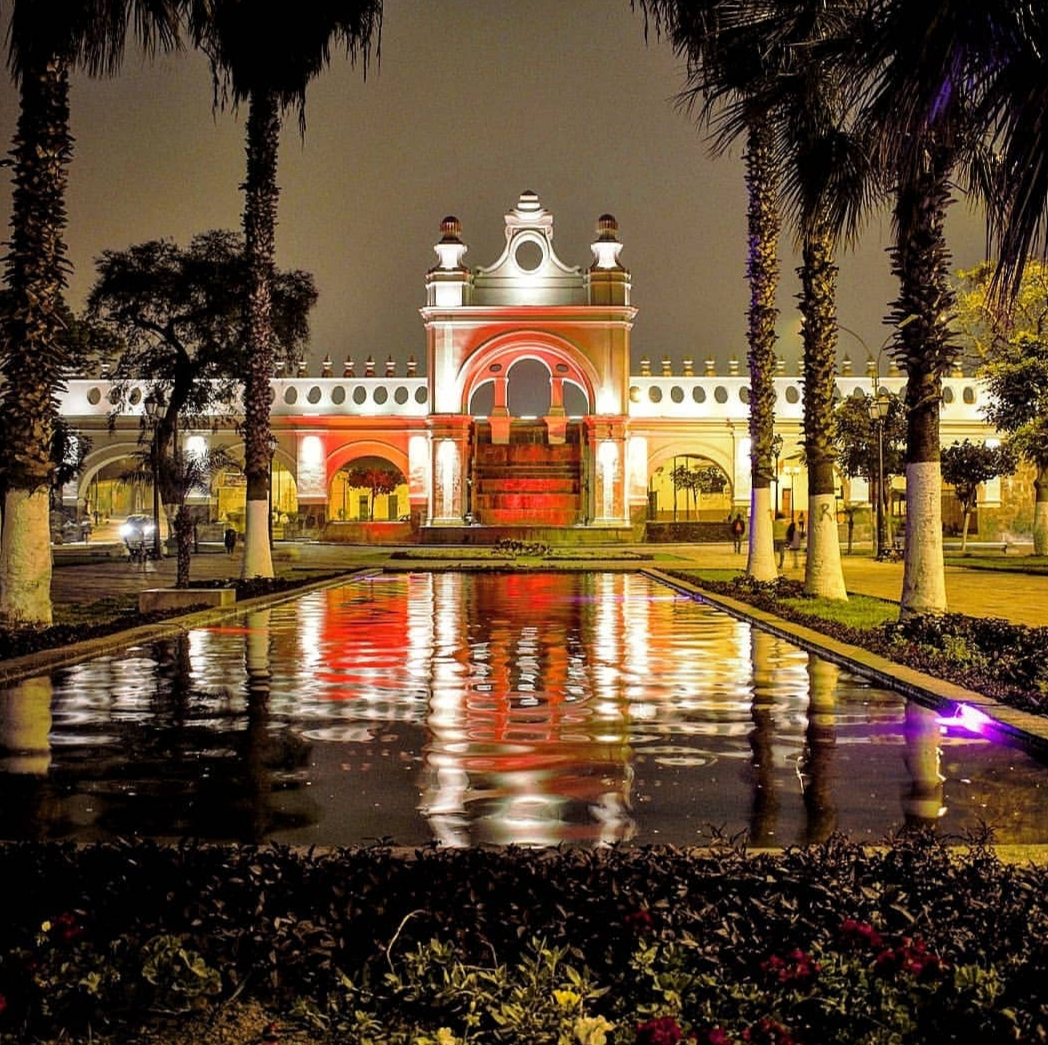
- Interactive map of Paseo de Aguas
- Type: Public park
- Location: Rímac District, Lima
- Created: 1776
- Open: 24 hours

The Paseo de Aguas is a promenade located in Jirón Madera of Rímac District, Lima, Peru. It was built between 1770 and 1776 by Viceroy Manuel de Amat y Juniet. Located nearby are the Alameda de los Descalzos and the Acho bullring. It has the colonial part of the main arch and remains of the side wall dating from the 18th century, as well as gardens, fountains, games and waterfalls. It was remodeled in 2014.

== History ==
Initially it was called Paseo de la Carbona by Viceroy Manuel de Amat y Junyent, its main promoter. The project included a waterfall, which was modeled on an existing water feature in Narbonne.

However, the neighbors opposed the big project due to the possibility of running out of water for their crops and personal needs. Thus, although the work was unfinished, it was inaugurated in 1772. From the beginning, there were problems with the water supply, which came through a ditch.

Since the mid-19th century and for several decades, a tram station and its offices used to operate on the Paseo de Aguas.

=== Post 19th century ===
In 1938 the archery was restored. In the 1950s, the site was a run-down municipal garden that was known for being the scene of the San Juan festival.

In 2014, the Municipality of Lima began the remodeling works. In July 2015, the mayor of Lima, Luis Castañeda Lossio, announced that the works would be completed in October 2015.

== Overview ==
The Paseo de Aguas constitutes a boulevard of the Jirón Madera. It is connected by the Hulgayoc street with the Alameda de los Descalzos and by the Alameda de Bobos with the Acho bullring, which are also viceregal works built in the 18th century.

The promenade has a larger central arch and a sequence of lower arches on both sides crowned by a succession of oculi and pinnacles.

== In popular culture ==
In his book Peruvian Traditions, Ricardo Palma records that his contemporaries invented the myth that Amat built the Paseo de Aguas "just to flatter his lady", the singer and actress Micaela Villegas. In 1781, she acquired a house-mill located between the Paseo and the Alameda de los Descalzos.

== Gallery ==
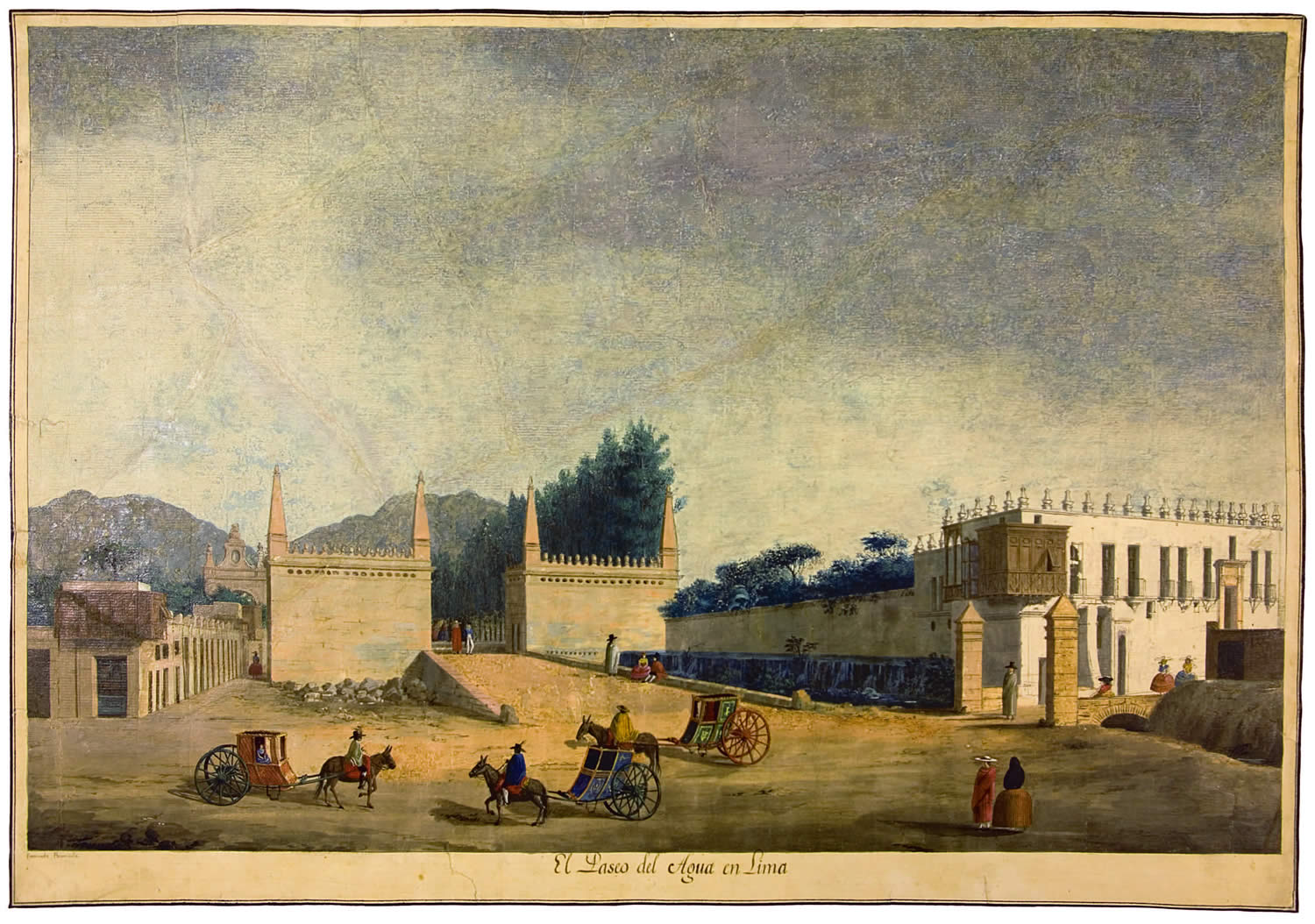
El Paseo del Agua en Lima, 1790

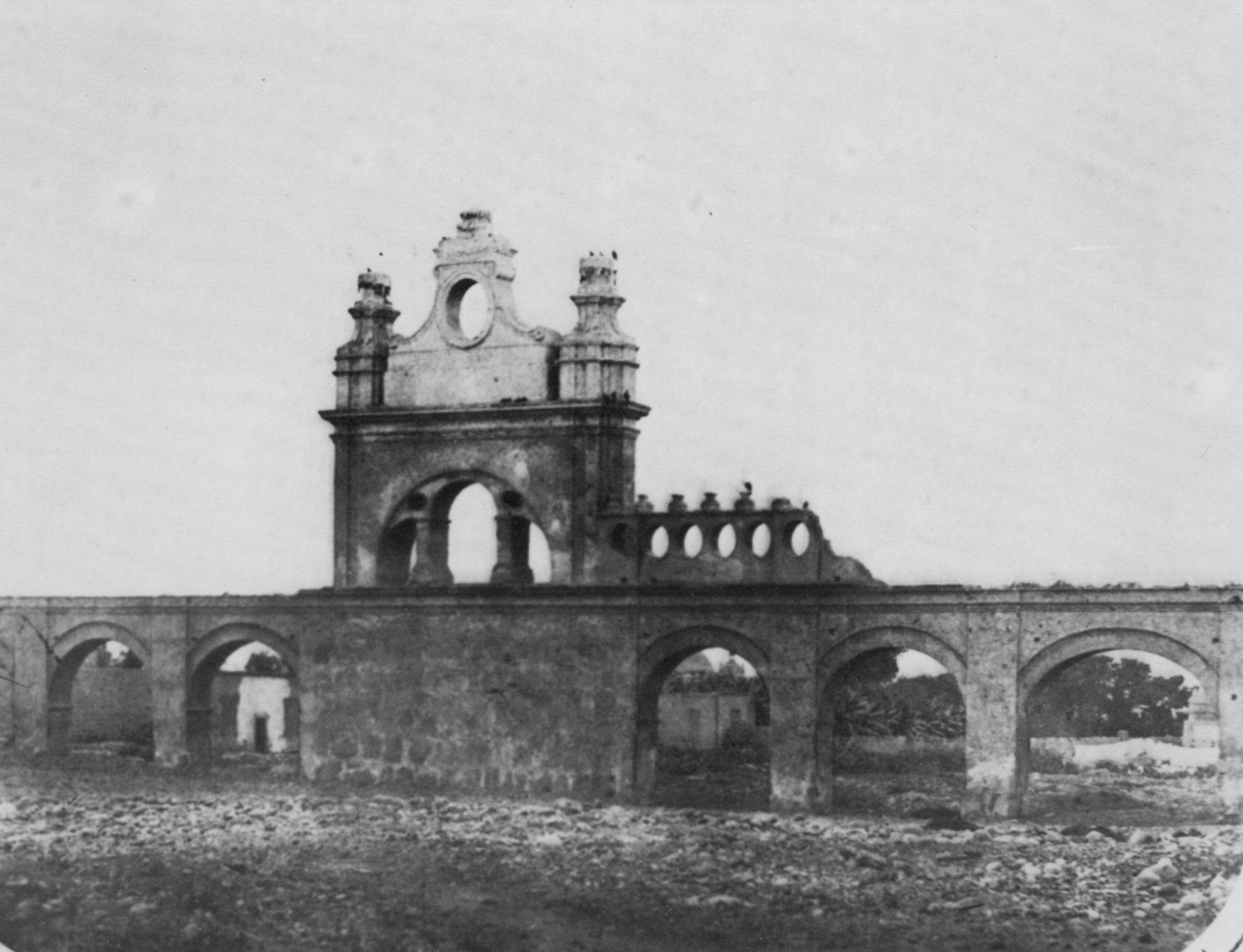
The gate in 1860 by Eugenio Courret

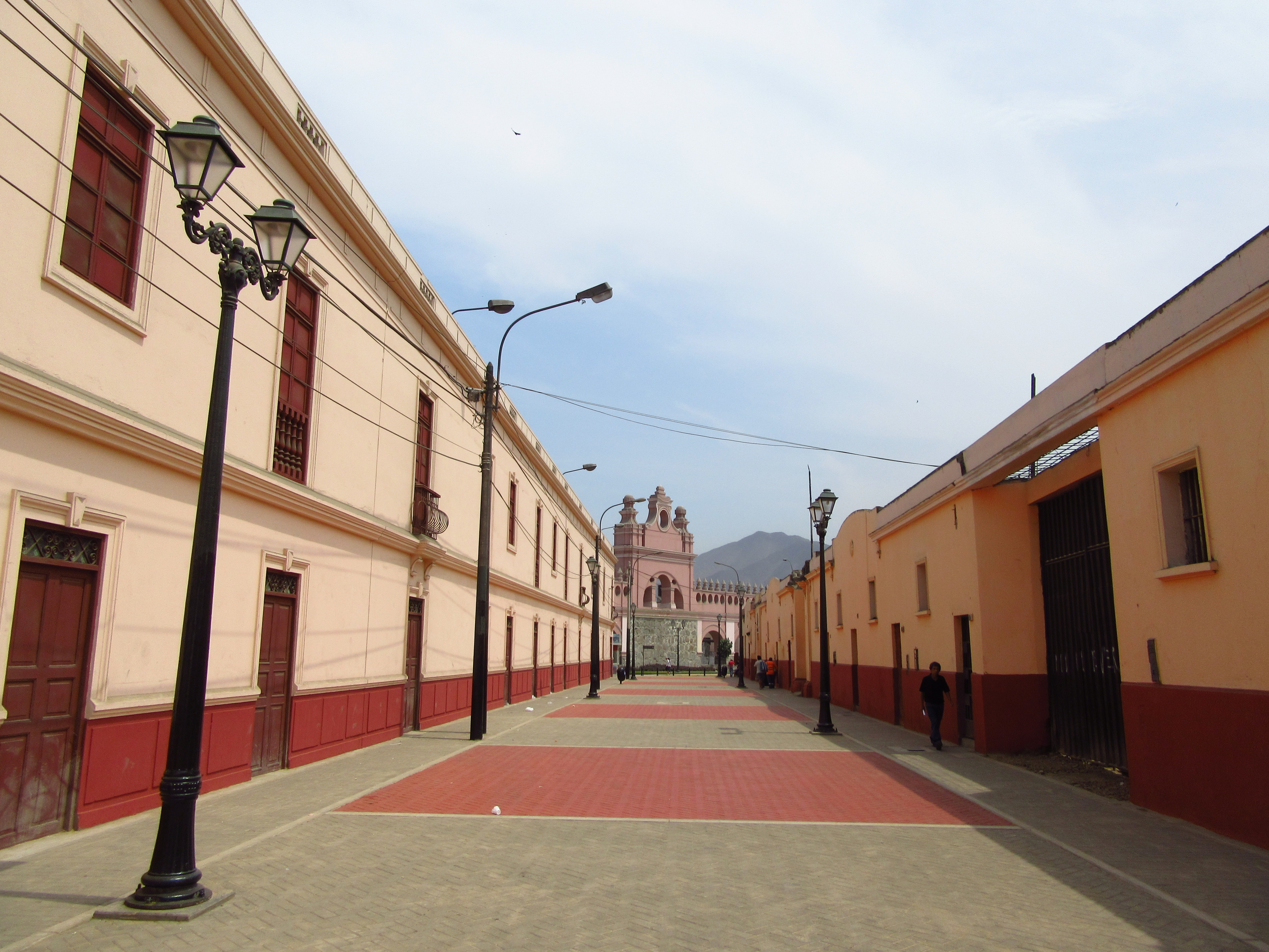
The gate seen from Jr. Hualgayoc

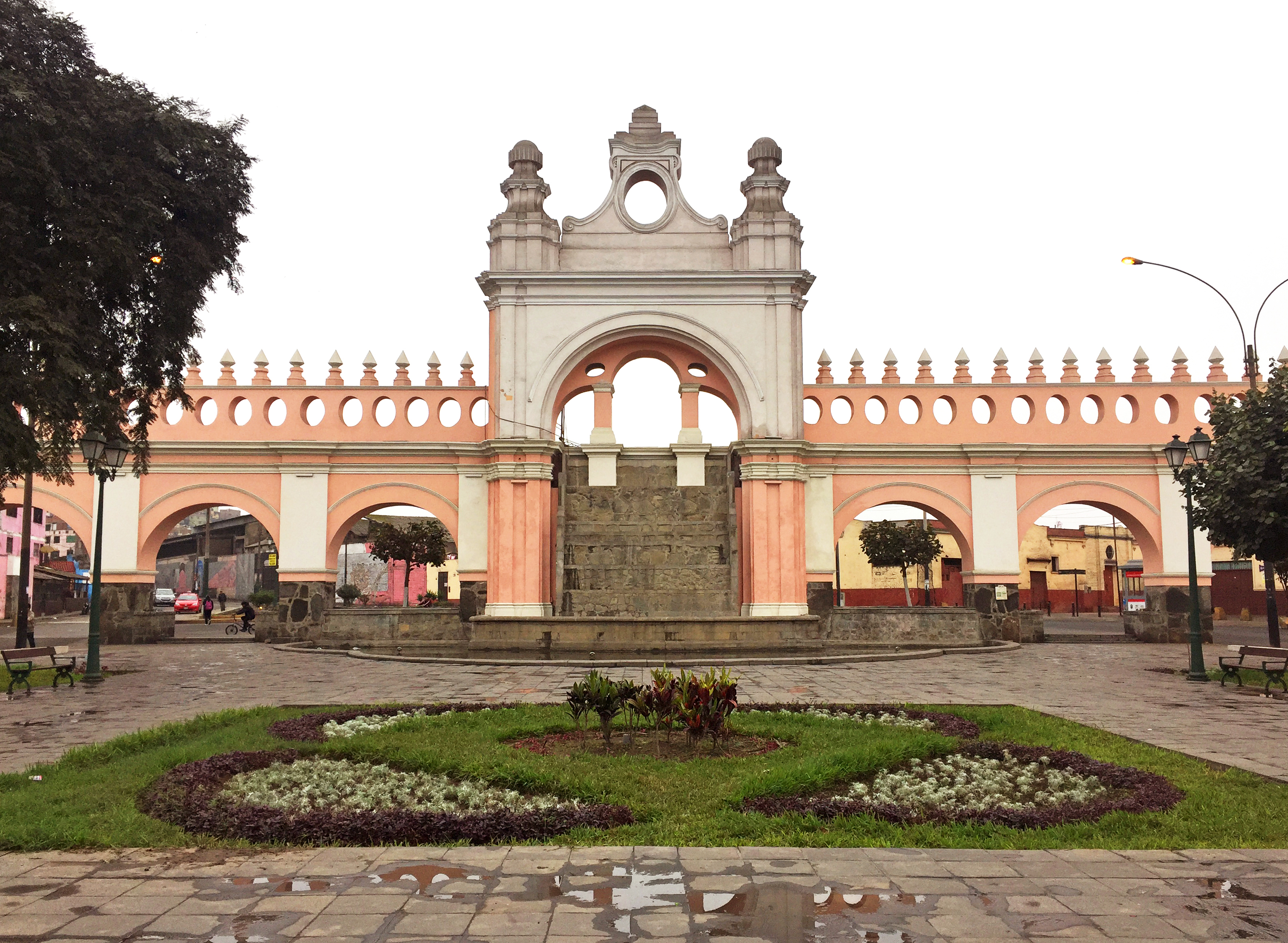
The arch in 2019

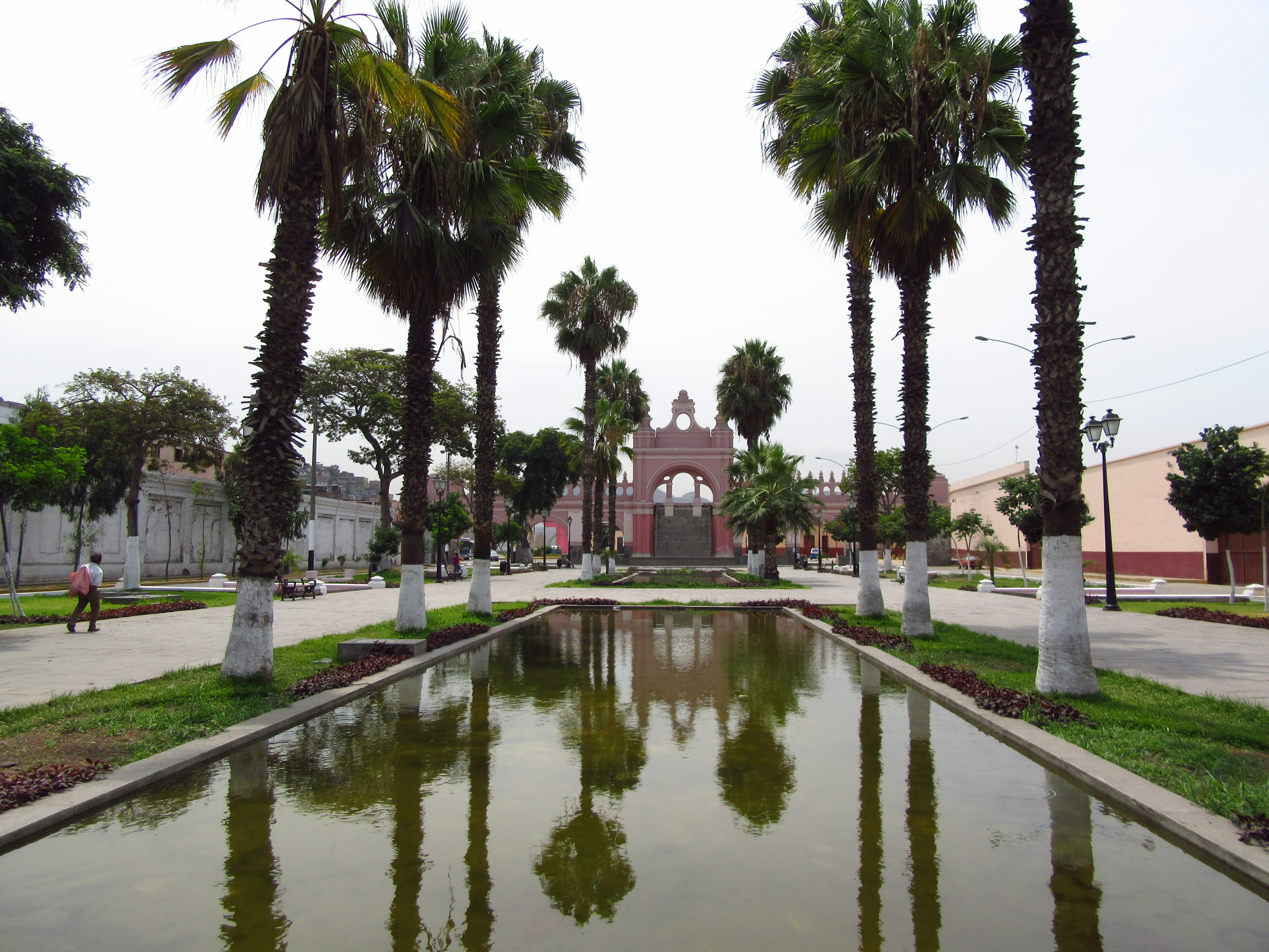
Reflecting pool

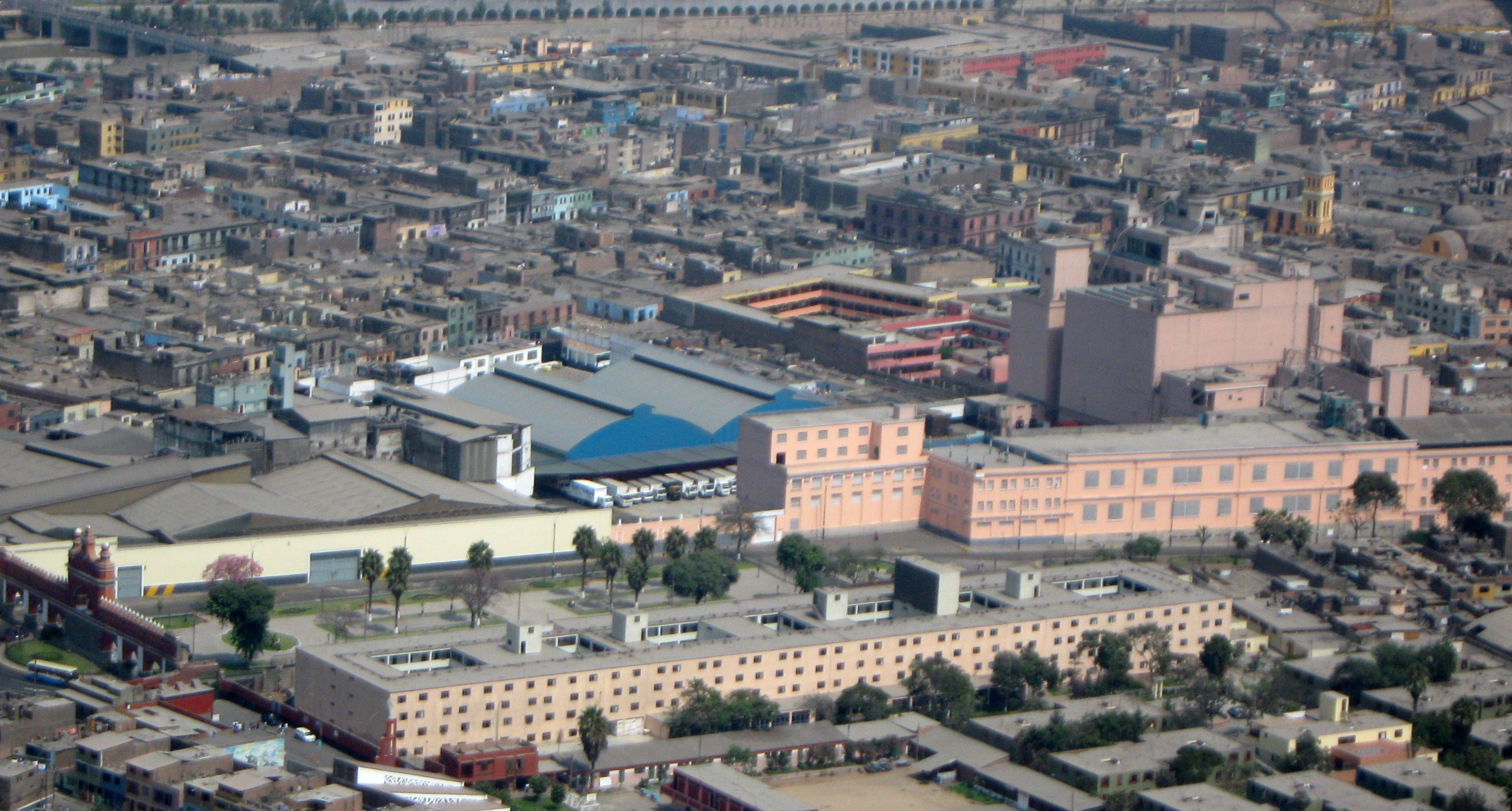
Aerial view

== See also ==
- Parque de la Reserva
