= Puente Piedra =

Puente Piedra is Spanish for Stone Bridge.

It may refer to:

- Puente de Piedra, a stone bridge across the Rímac River in Lima, Peru
- Puente Piedra District, one of the northern districts in Lima
