= Church of Saint Lazarus, Lima =

Church in Lima, Peru

Coordinates: 12°02′22″S 77°01′45″W

Church of Saint Lazarus
- Iglesia de San Lázaro
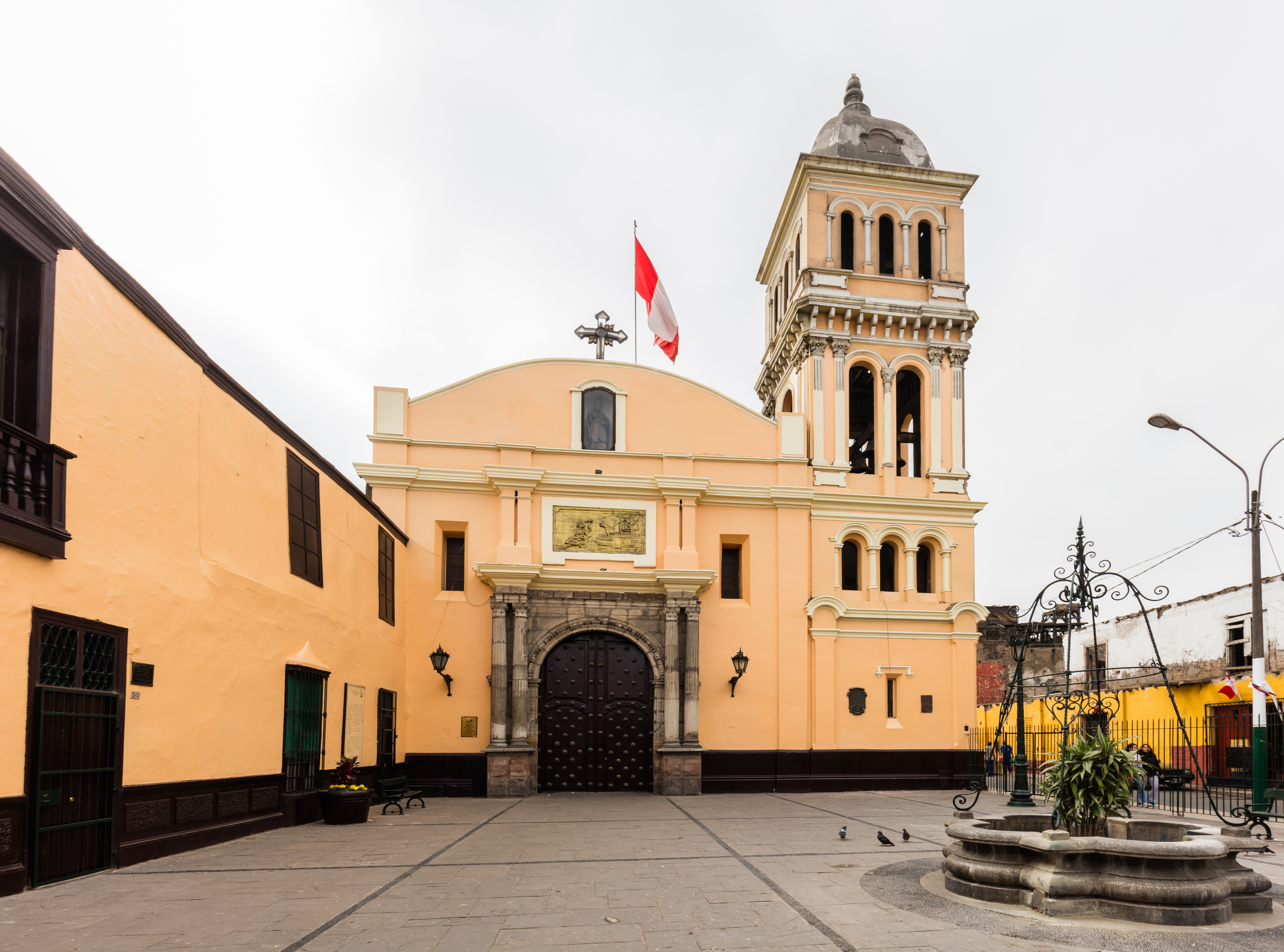
- The church in 2015

Religion
- Affiliation: Catholic
- Governing body: Archdiocese of Lima

Location
- Location: Rímac District, Lima
- Interactive map of Church of Saint Lazarus

Architecture
- Style: Baroque
- Completed: 1586

The Church of Saint Lazarus (Spanish: Iglesia de San Lázaro) is a Catholic church in Rímac District, part of the Historic Centre of Lima, Peru. Built in 1586, it was the first church built in the area. Since then it has been rebuilt several times after the damage left by the various earthquakes in Peru. It is located on block five of Jirón Trujillo, at the intersection with Francisco Pizarro Avenue.

Up until the 19th century, the church gave the neighbourhood of San Lázaro its name, until it separated from Lima District as the district of Rímac.

== History ==
The church is located in an area near the Rímac River that has been occupied since pre-Hispanic times. The suburb that formed around it was occupied by local Indians, blacks, the sick, friars and travelers. The first construction in the place was a leprosarium opened around 1563 by Antón Sánchez on the road to Trujillo. Then, with the authorisation of Viceroy Count of Nieva and Archbishop Jerónimo de Loayza, Sánchez built the hospital and the church of San Lázaro.

The complex adopted the name of San Lázaro on behalf of Lazarus of Bethany, the patron saint of the sick and lepers. From 1586 until the 19th century, Rímac district was known as the neighbourhood of San Lázaro after the temple.

During the 1586 Lima–Callao earthquake the complex suffered catastrophic damage. In 1606 the brotherhood of San Lázaro rebuilt the hospital and in 1626, the church. The earthquakes of 1687, 1690 and especially that of 1746 once again left the hospital and the church in ruins. On April 23, 1758, a new hospital headquarters was inaugurated, which operated there until 1822.

The temple was elevated to the status of a parish in 1736. With the exception of the tower, the temple that existed then is the same as today.

== See also ==
- Jirón Trujillo, originally named after the church
