= Jirón Trujillo =

Street in Lima, Peru

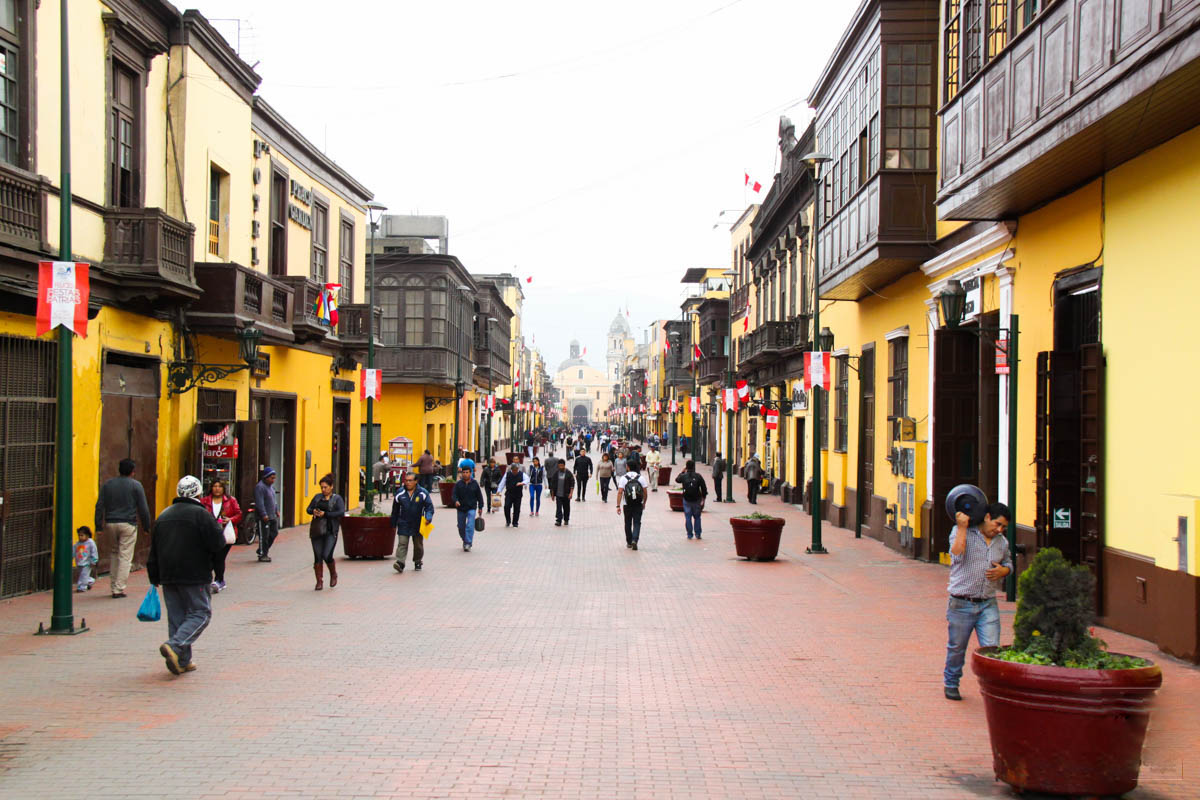
- Part of: Historic Centre of Lima
- Namesake: Trujillo, Peru
- From: Puente de Piedra
- To: Alameda de los Bobos

Construction
- Completion: 1535

Jirón Trujillo is an important street in Rímac District, part of the historic centre of Lima, Peru. The street starts at the Puente de Piedra, where it is continued on the other side of the Rímac River by the Jirón de la Unión (with which it forms part of the historic centre's main axis), and continues until it reaches the Alameda de los Bobos. It therefore joins the so-called monumental zones of both Rímac and Lima districts.

== History ==
The road that today constitutes the street was laid by Francisco Pizarro during the foundation of Lima. Prior to the nomenclature adapted in 1861, it was simply known as its entirety as the street that joined the bridge with the Church of Saint Lazarus. Prior to this renaming, each block (cuadra) had a unique name:

- Block 1: Puente, after the bridge next to it. It is the shortest block of the street, and it formerly housed a windmill that lasted until the 19th century.
- Block 2: Capilla, after the ermitage—today church—of Our Lady of the Rosary.
- Block 3: Queipo, after an unidentified neighbour.
- Block 4: San Lázaro, after the church of the same name. It was previously known as Montero, possibly after a surname.
- Block 5: Matamoros, after the surname, whose bearer has not been definitively identified.
- Block 6: Puente Amaya, after a surname.
- Block 7: Puente de Soga, after a rudimentary bridge.
- Block 8: Pedregal, after the rocky terrain of the area.

A boulevard was inaugurated by then president Alan García in 2009, as part of a remodelling programme that targeted the district. The works consisted of improvement of the roads, the painting of the buildings' façades and the cleaning of their roofs.

The street is the location of the Church of Our Lady of the Rosary, the country's smallest church, surrounded by buildings with their characteristic balconies.

== See also ==
- Historic Centre of Lima
