= Church and convent of San Agustín, Quito =

Catholic temple in Quito, Ecuador

Coordinates: 0.22033324640010823°S 78.51047644379705°W

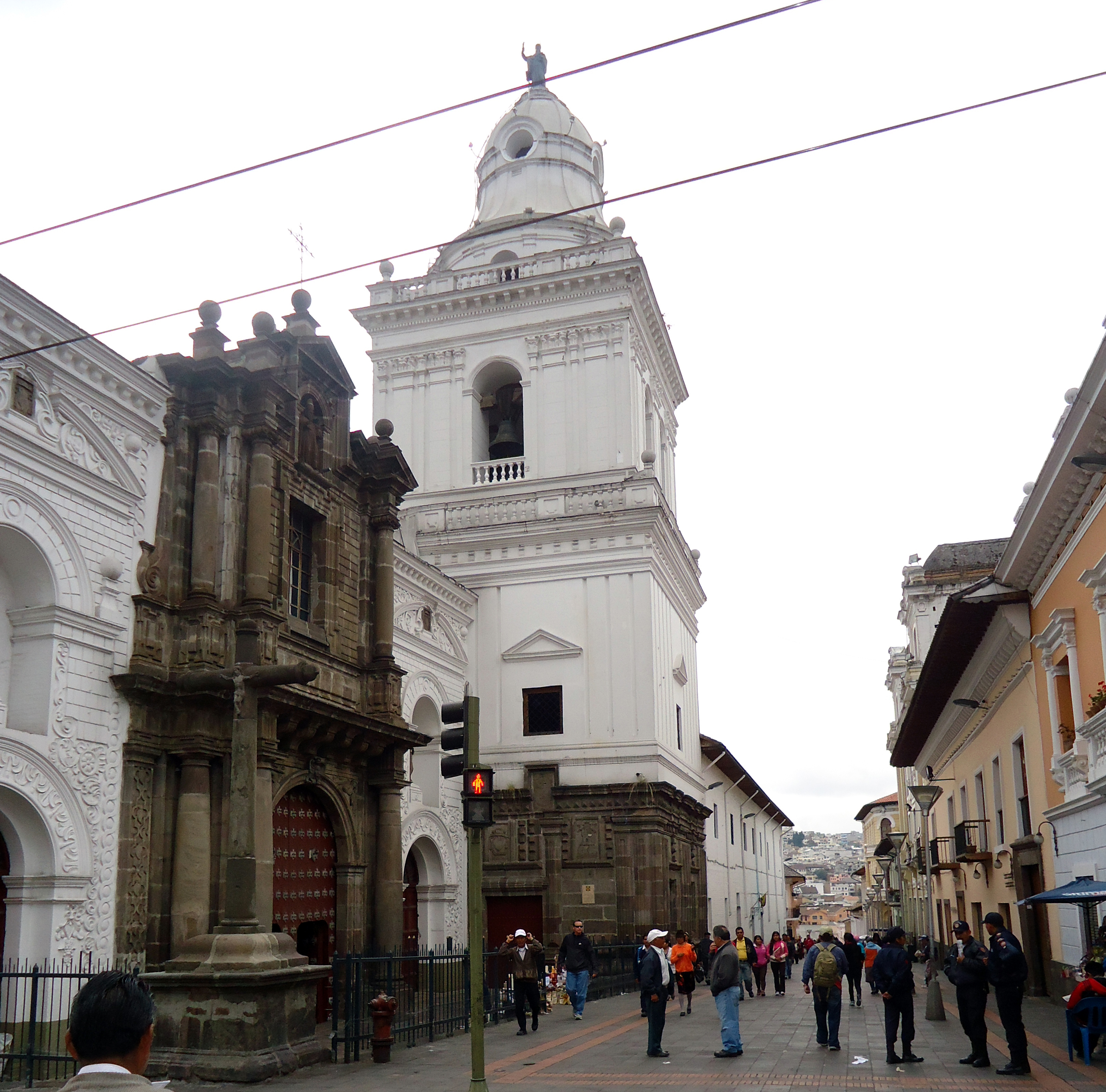
Church of San Agustín

The Church and convent of San Agustín is a Catholic temple run by the Augustinian Order located in the Historic Center of Quito, Ecuador. The complex of the temple and convent is located on calle Chile, between Guayaquil and Flores.

== Building ==
The site was assigned to the Augustinian order in 1573, when they began construction of the convent, although the church would only be built between 1606 and 1617 by Juan del Corral, based on the plans designed by the architect Francisco Becerra in 1581, who also worked on the design of the Church of Santo Domingo.

Details of the main portal reveal the Neoclassical style printed by Diego de Escarza, in which Spanish and Amerindian decorative elements stand out. The bell tower reaches a height of 37 meters and inside it the same bells placed there in the 17th century.

The convent built in the 16th century, which has a separate entrance on the eastern side of the façade, forms a single architectural complex together with the temple and a small atrium with a stone cross on the corner diametrically opposite the latter's entrance. The cloister was completed in the middle of the 17th century. Inside the cloisters there are gardens and a large session hall called the Chapter House, which was only conceived in the 18th century, and where the Act of the Governing Board of 1809 was signed and there the first cry of freedom was given.

== Art pieces ==
Painting name	Artist	Date
Conversion of Saint Augustine Beneath the Fig Tree (Conversión de San Agustín Debajo de la Higuera)	Miguel de Santiago	17th century

On its main altar hangs an enormous painting, the work of Miguel de Santiago, in the 17th century, called "The Triumph of Saint Augustine".

== Gallery ==
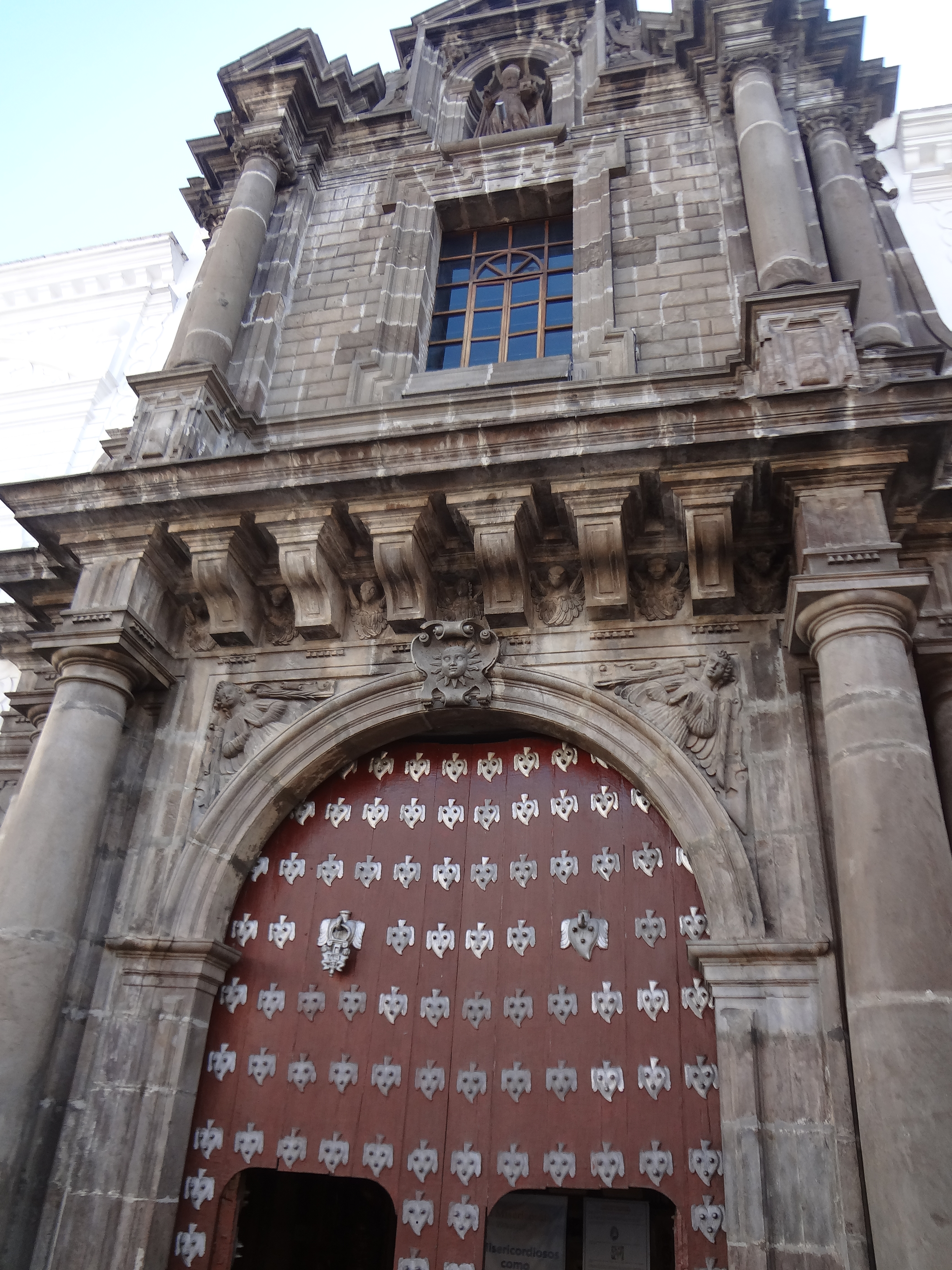
Main portal and door

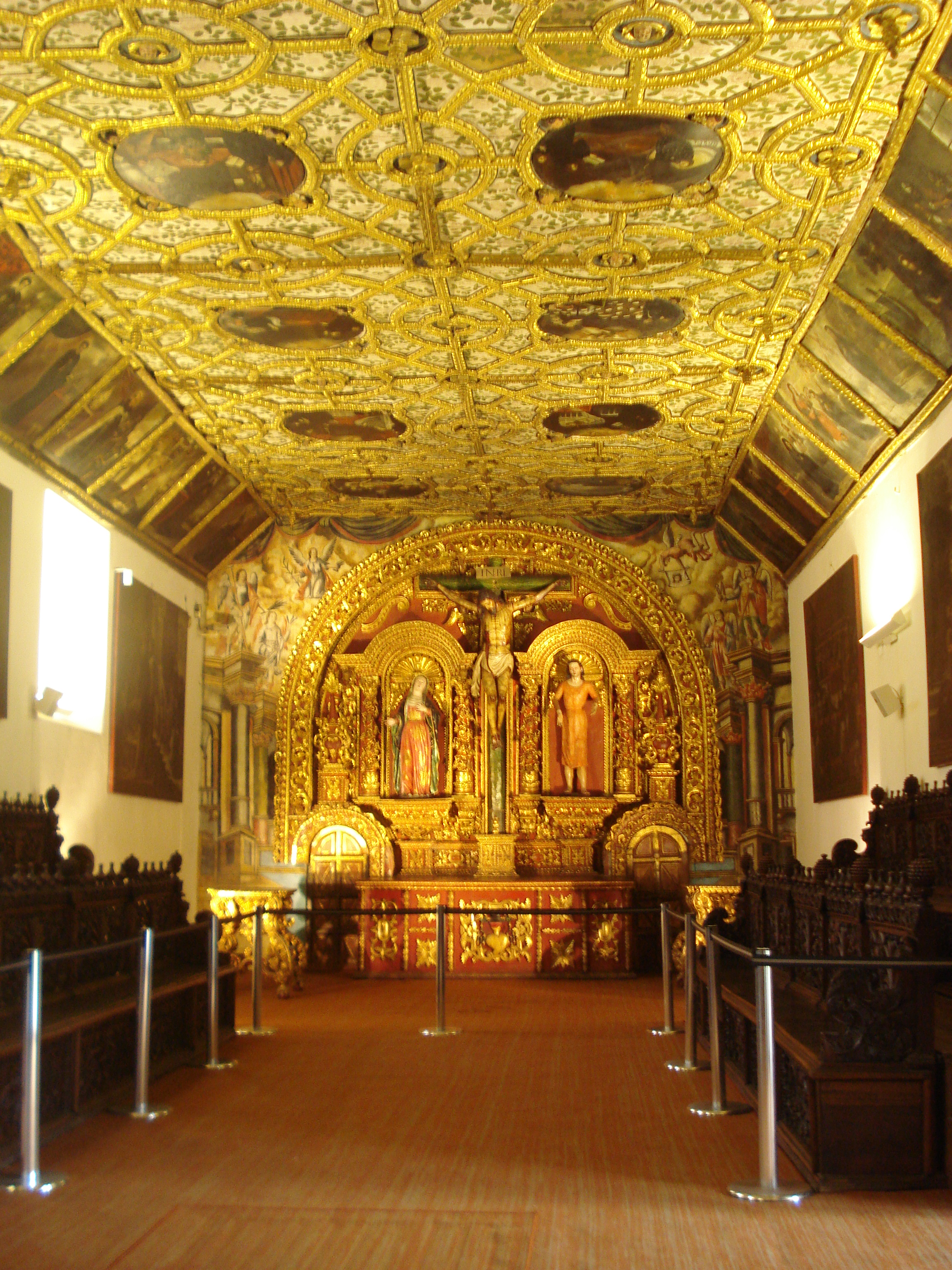
Reredos of the chapter house

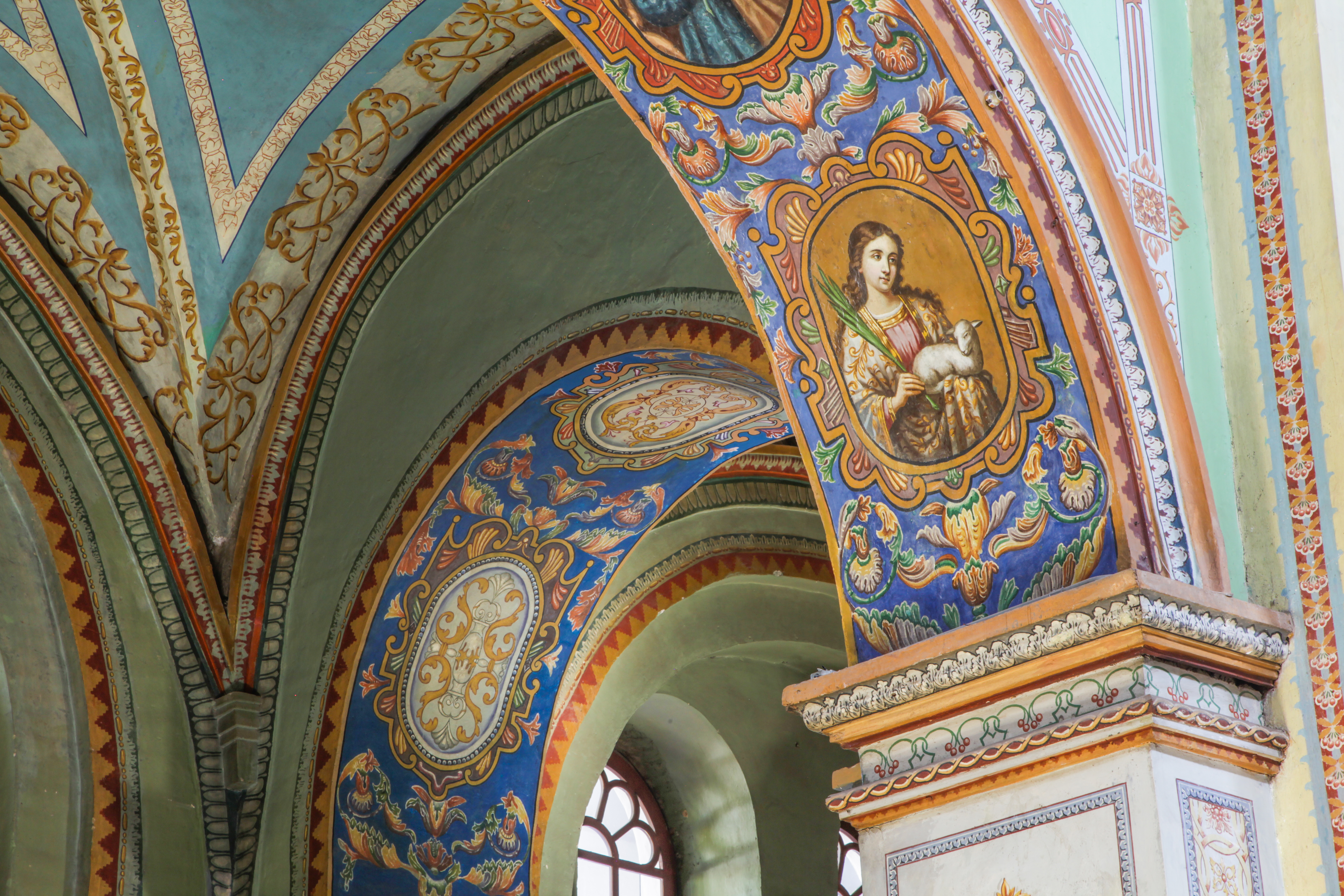
Detail

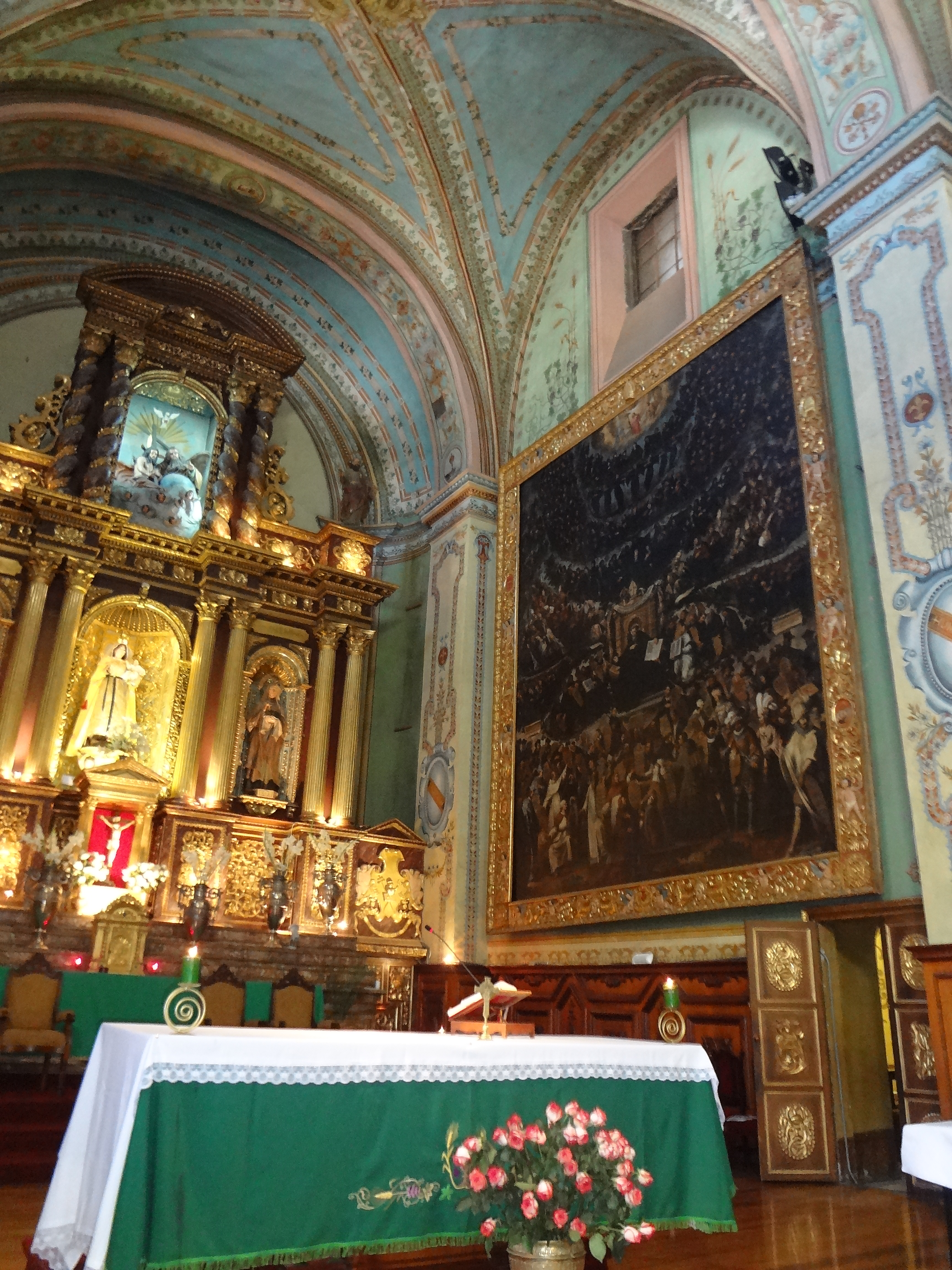
Reredos

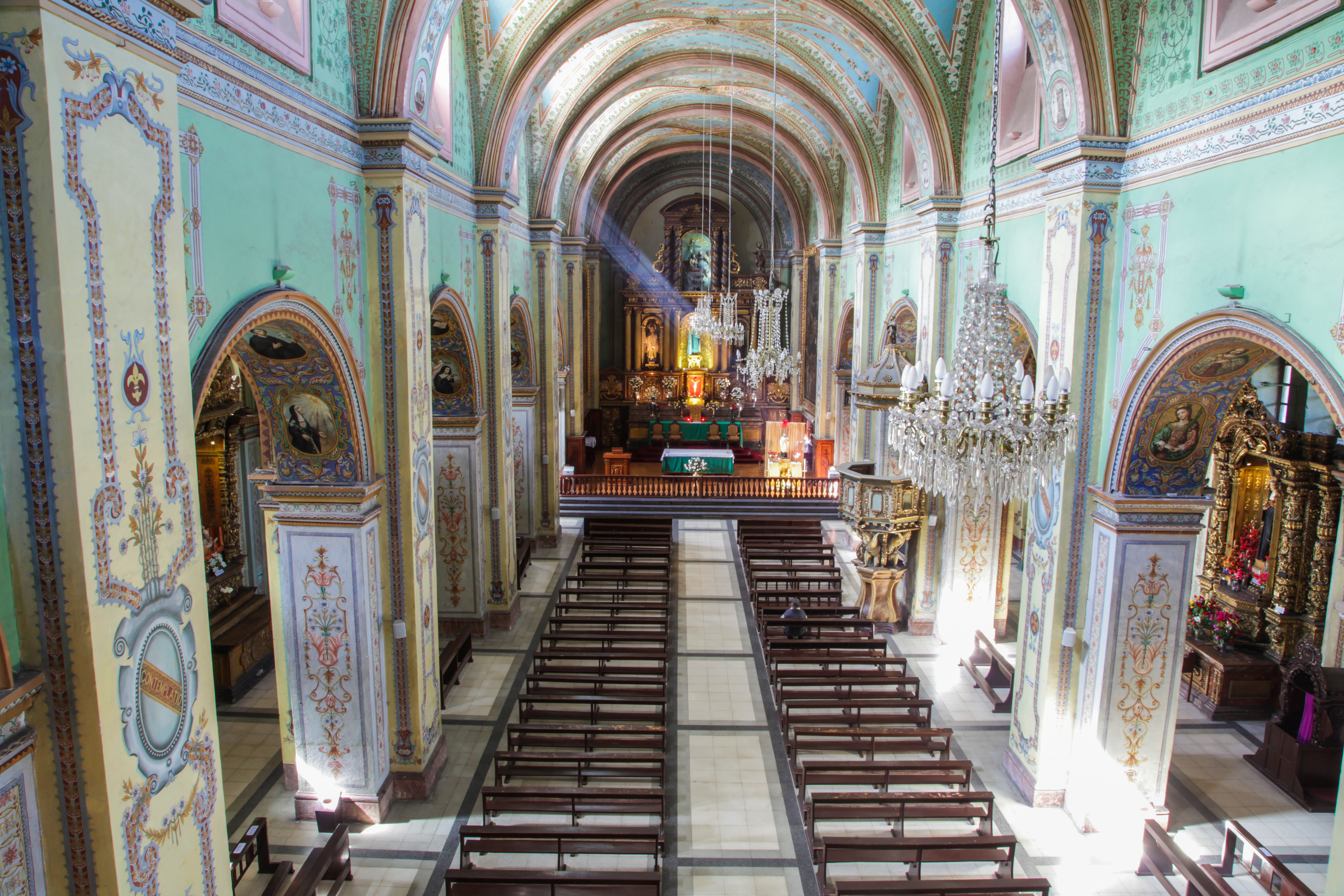
Interior

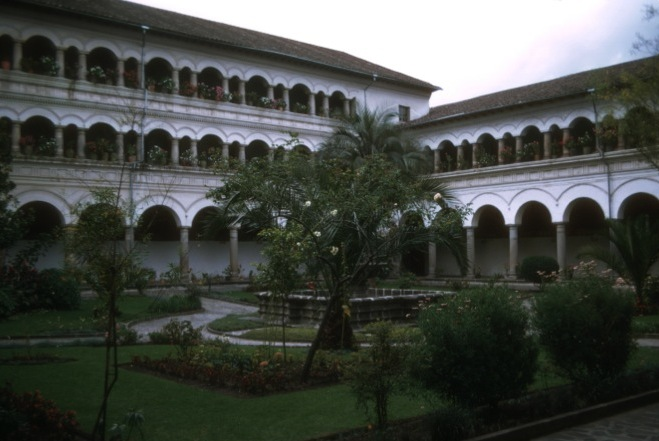
Cloister

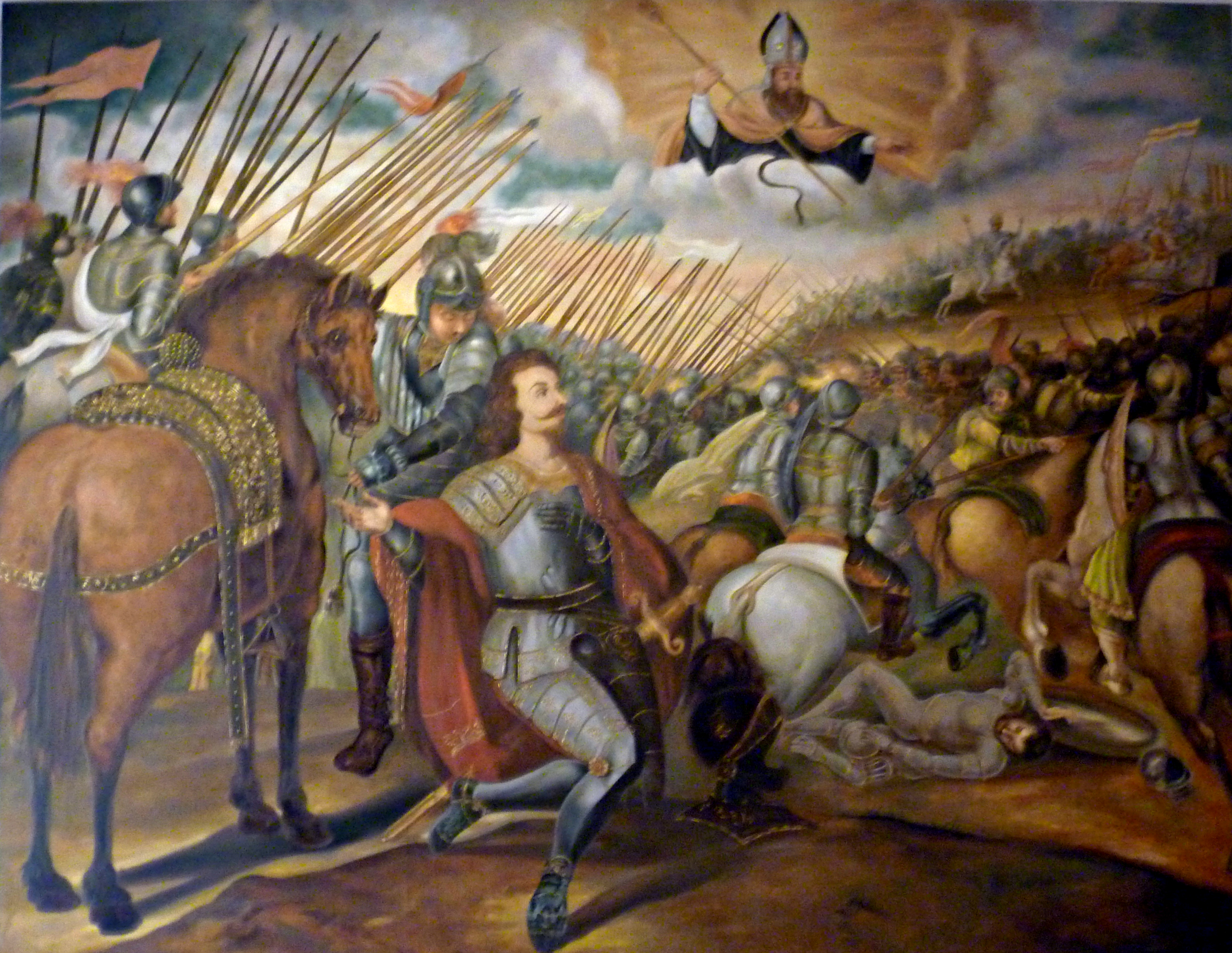
Saint Augustine appears to the Duke of Mantua, by Miguel de Santiago (17th century)

== See also ==
- List of buildings in Quito
