= Juan del Corral =

Juan del Corral was an early seventeenth century Spanish architect who worked in Peru. His most famous bridge, El Puente de Piedra in Lima is known as the Bridge of Eggs because the myth is that it was constructed using sea bird egg whites mixed with stone.
