= Puente de Piedra =

17th century bridge in Lima, Peru

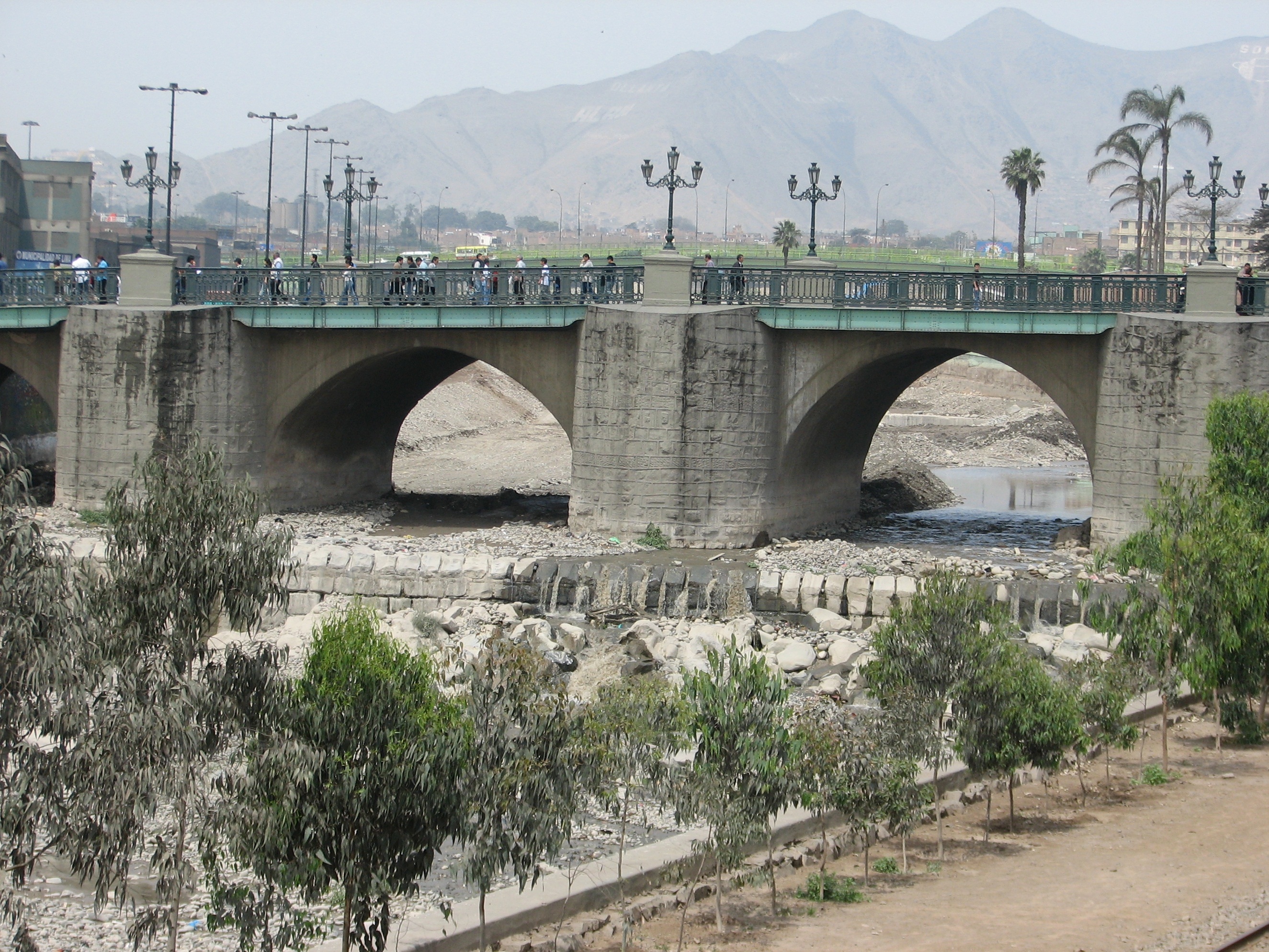
- Coordinates: 12°02′36″S 77°01′47″W
- Begins: Jirón Trujillo
- Ends: Jirón de la Unión
- Heritage status: National and UNESCO World Heritage site (1988)

History
- Architect: Juan del Corral
- Built: 1610

Location
- Interactive map of Puente de Piedra

The Bridge of Stone (Spanish: Puente de Piedra) is a 17th-century bridge in Lima, Peru, that connects the districts of Lima and Rímac, both part of the city's historic centre. Built by architect Juan del Corral as the city's only bridge until 1861, it connects the northern Jirón Trujillo with the southern Jirón de la Unión, the latter having once been the most important street in the city.

== Name ==
The bridge is known by several names, including Old Bridge (Spanish: Puente Antiguo), Trujillo Bridge (Spanish: Puente Trujillo)—after the street of the same name)—and Egg Bridge, which comes from the stone masonry mortar which was erroneously believed to have been mixed with egg whites from sea birds to improve its consistency.

== History ==
The Stone Bridge replaced the bridge that the viceroy Andrés Hurtado de Mendoza had ordered to be built in the 16th century and that a flood of the Rímac river had destroyed in 1607.

It was built in 1610 by the Spanish architect Juan del Corral, born in Santander, during the mandate of Viceroy Juan de Mendoza y Luna, Marquis of Montesclaros, before the progressive urbanization of the neighborhood "below the bridge" (current district of Rímac). It cost more than 400,000 pesos at that time.

At the entrance to the bridge, on the Cercado side, the Gate of Lima was built, a stone and brick structure, which was damaged on several occasions due to several earthquakes. In 1738, a bronze statue of Felipe V, made by Baltazar Gavilán. This was destroyed in the 1746 earthquake and was replaced by a monumental clock, which was nevertheless destroyed in a fire in 1789.

The bridge was the only link between the north bank of the bridge and the old walled city until the 19th century.

In 1808 important repairs were carried out during the viceroyalty of Joaquín de la Pezuela. Until 1861, when the Balta Bridge was built, it was the only link between the old walled city and the north bank. In 1902 the bridge was widened and acquired its current form.

With the construction of the Vía de Evitamiento, a public transport stop was established, which was transferred in 2006 after the construction of the Rayito de Sol Bridge. In 2010, it was lowered for the construction of the Vía Parque Rímac tunnel on the Yellow Line.

== See also ==
- Puente Santa Rosa
- Ricardo Palma Bridge
