= Plaza de toros de Acho =

Bull ring and cultural heritage site in Peru

Coordinates: 12.0414°S 77.0233°W

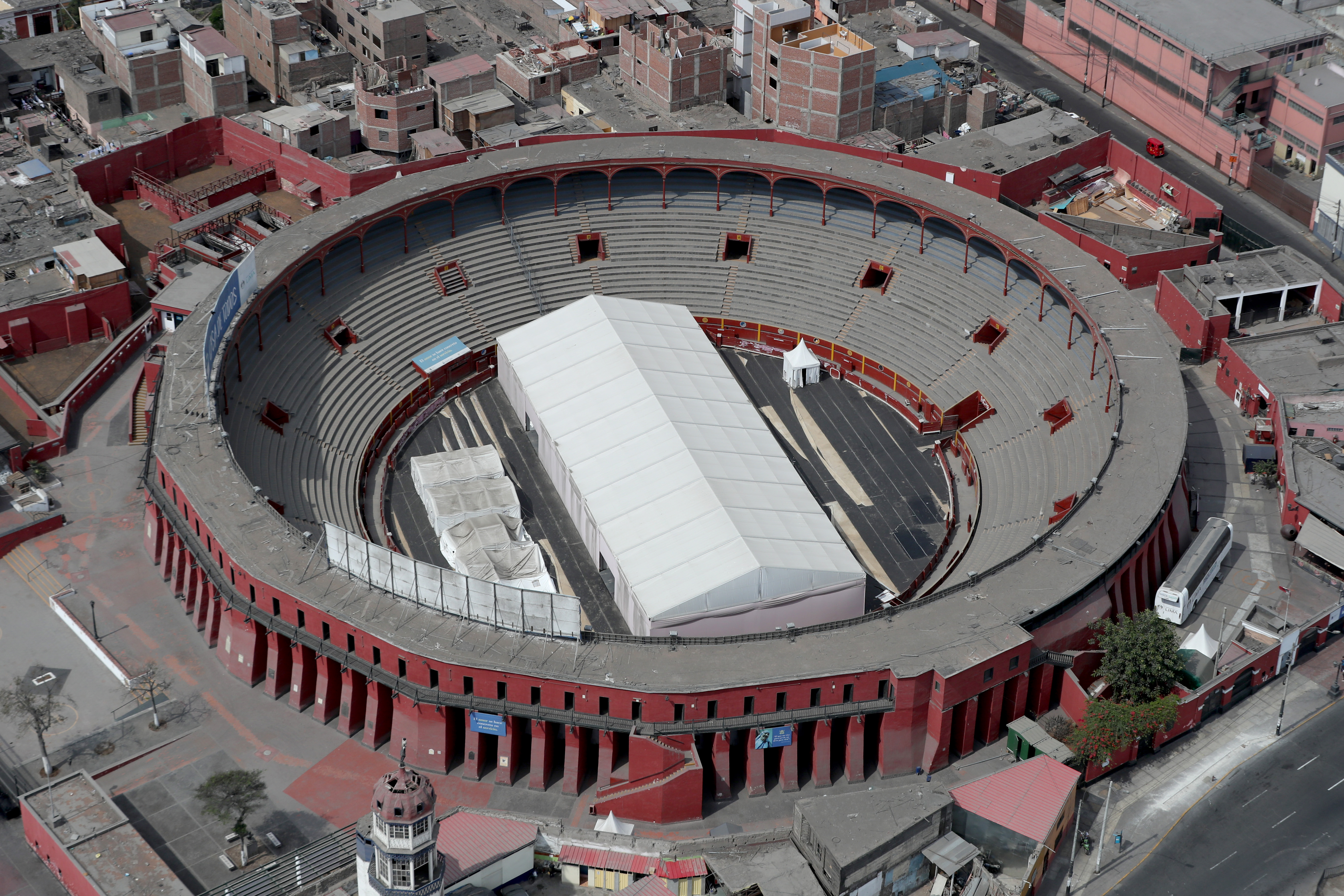
- Exterior view of the Plaza de Acho
- Interactive map of Plaza de toros de Acho
- Location: Rímac District, Lima, Peru
- Owner: Charity of Lima
- Capacity: 14,000

Construction
- Opened: 30 January 1766
- Renovated: 1944
- Architect: Francisco Graña Garland

The Plaza de Toros de Acho is the premier bullring in Lima, Peru. Located beside the historical center of the Rímac District, the plaza is classified as a national historic monument. It is the oldest bullring in the Americas and the second-oldest in the world after La Maestranza in Spain (not counting the Roman Empire-era Arles Amphitheatre in France). It opened on 30 January 1766.

Of the 56 official bullrings in Peru, the Plaza de Acho ranks most prominently. It has a seating capacity of 13,700 and was constructed of adobe and wood, both traditional materials.

== History ==
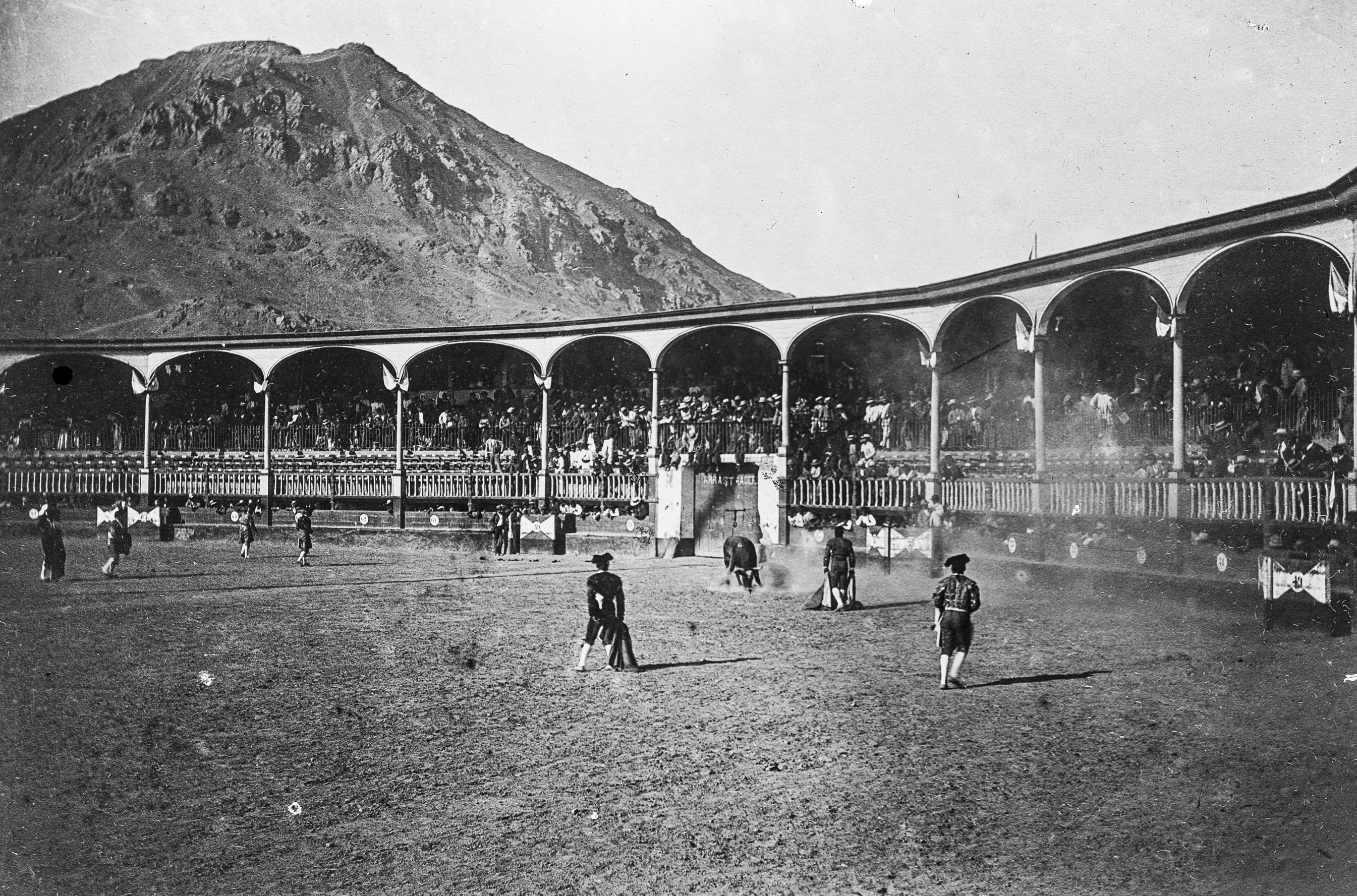
Plaza de Acho in 1890

In 1765, Agustín Hipólito de Landaburu sought permission to construct what he called "a fixed plaza for the corridas de toros" that would take place in Lima during the city's celebration of Carnival. The plaza would be constructed in the Rímac district on a site that had been used for several temporary bullrings since 1754. The site was called “el Hacho,” a Quechua word meaning “elevated place with view of the sea.” Construction on the plaza officially began on 30 January 1766.

The inaugural run took place on 30 January 1766, and showcased the bullfighters Pisí, Maestro de España, and Gallipavo. The first bull to be killed in the plaza was a white animal called "El Albañil," meaning The Mason.

Throughout its existence, revenues from the Plaza de Acho have been designated for the organizers of different corridas. An exception to this was during the war for independence from Spain: between the years of 1821 and 1826 all proceeds from the plaza were directed to the liberating army.

The plaza was remodeled once, in 1944, due to deteriorated conditions. Although the work was generally considered successful in retaining the plaza's beloved characteristics, at least one writer bemoaned the "fall" of the old plaza: "Solemn, silent and decrepit—like those old actresses burdened with years-old glories and fames—the old Plaza de Toros de Lima has fallen."

Since its opening, the Plaza de Acho has hosted many famous bullfighters or toreros, including Juan Belmonte, Manuel Rodríguez 'Manolete', Luis Miguel Domínguez 'Dominguín', and Manuel Benítez 'El Cordobés'.

In September 19 of 1987 Plaza de Acho was the site of Los Prisioneros most famous concert in Peru.

== Acho today ==
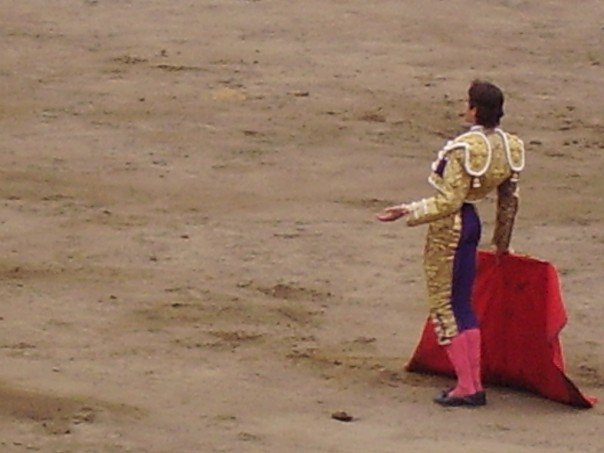
Sebastian Castella at Acho, 2008

The bullfighting fair held in honor of the annual Señor de los Milagros festival takes place at the plaza on Sundays through October and November. During the fair, Lima brings in some of the world's most lauded talent: the bill for 2019, for example, included Andrés Roca Rey, Sebastian Castella, and José Mari Manzanares. The best bullfighter of the year is awarded the Escapulario de Oro (Golden Scapular), while the Escapulario de Plata (Silver Scapular) goes to the provider of the best bull. Sometimes either or both scapulars may go unawarded.

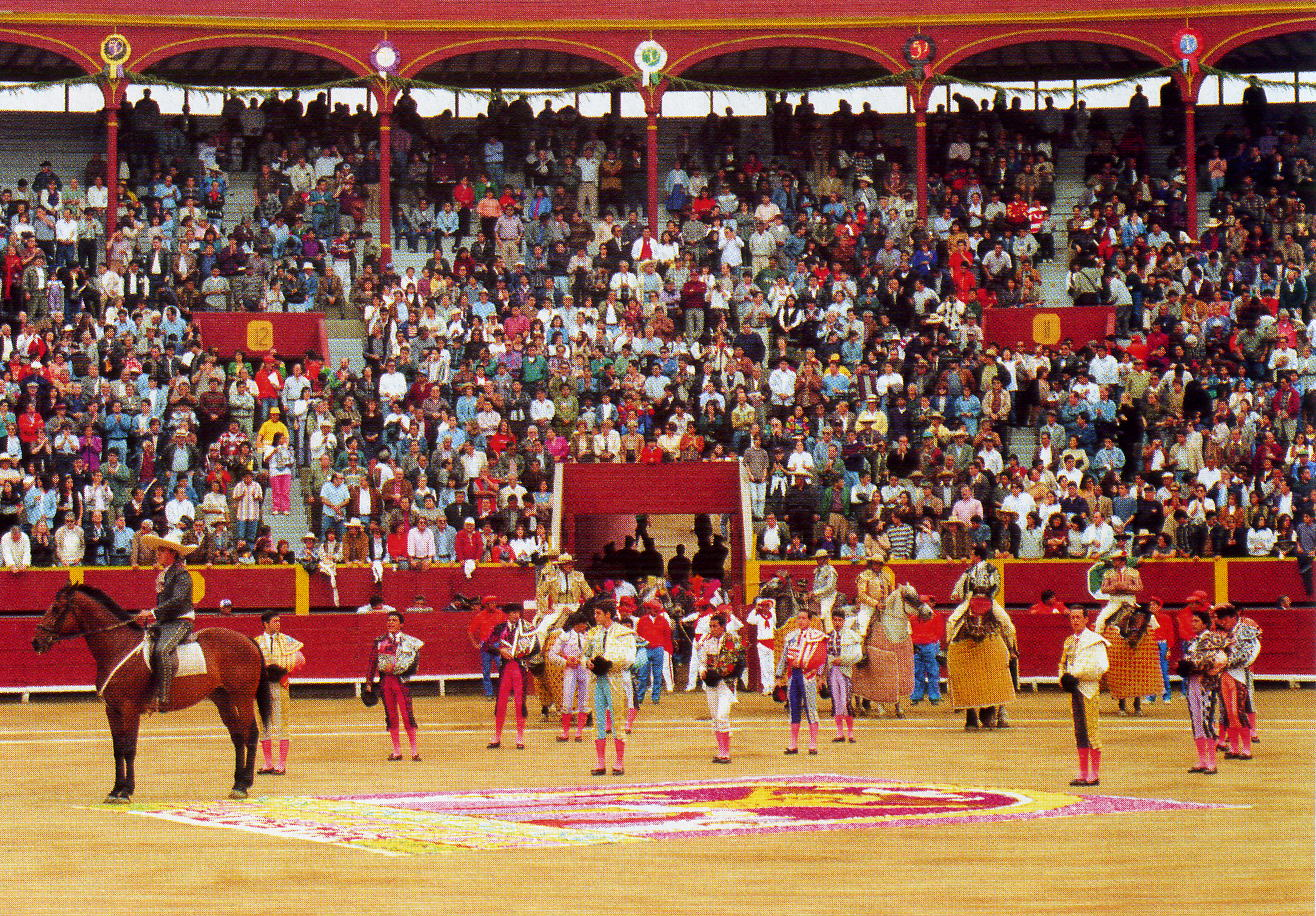
Parade
