= Rímac District =

District of Lima, Peru

Coordinates: 12°02′07″S 77°01′38″W

Rímac
- District
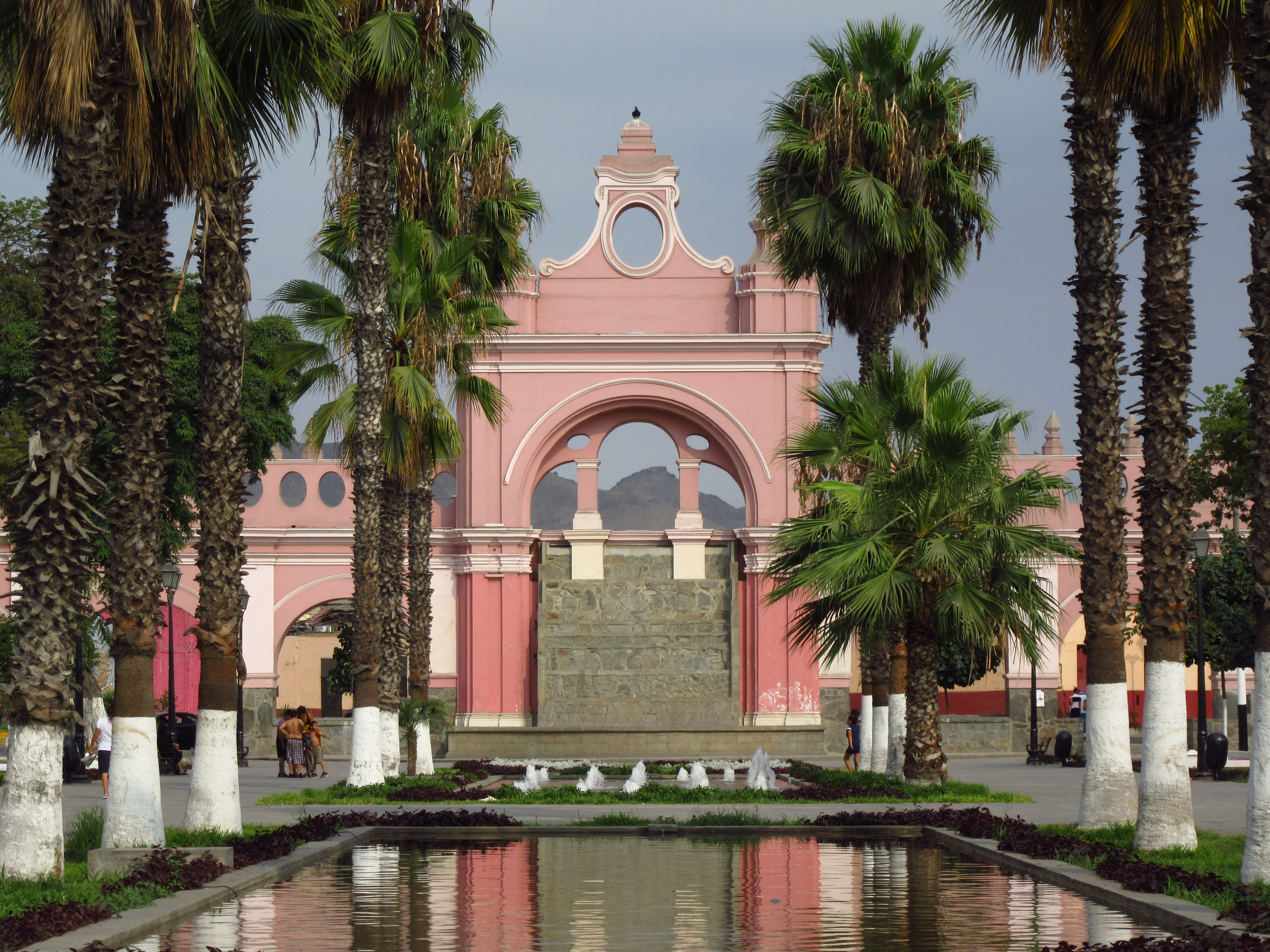
- The Paseo de Aguas

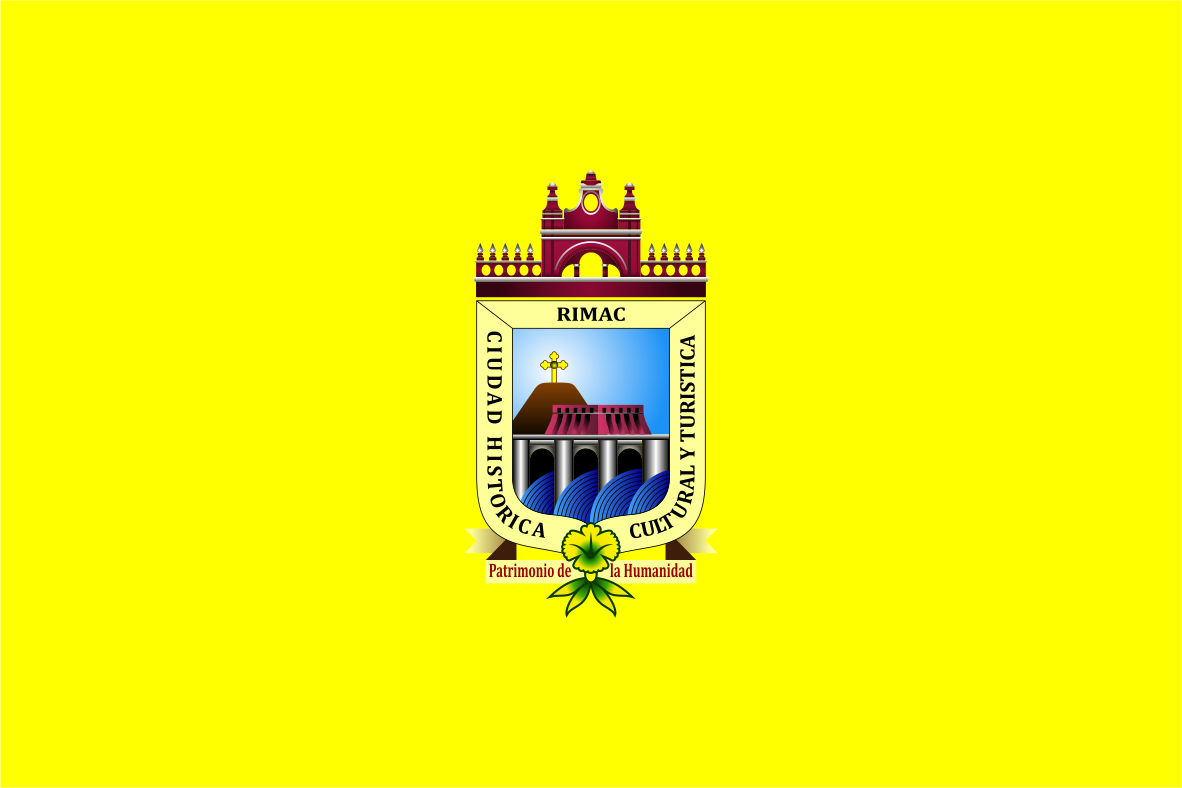
- Flag Coat of arms

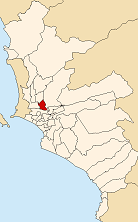
- Location of Rímac in Peru
- Country: Peru
- Department: Lima
- Province: Lima
- Founded: February 2, 1920

Government
  - Mayor: Nestor De La Rosa

Area
  - Total: 11.87 km^{2} (4.58 sq mi)

Population (2023)
  - Total: 187,462
  - Density: 15,790/km^{2} (40,900/sq mi)
- Time zone: UTC-5 (PET)
- UBIGEO: 150128
- Website: munirimac.gob.pe

Cultural Heritage of Peru
- Official name: Zona Monumental del Rímac
- Type: Immobable tangible
- Designated: December 28, 1972
- Legal basis: R.S. Nº 2900-72-ED

UNESCO World Heritage Site
- Official name: Distrito de El Rímac
- Type: Non-movable
- Designated: 1991
- Part of: Historic Centre of Lima
- Reference no.: 500

Rímac (Spanish pronunciation: [ˈri.mak]) is a district of Lima, Peru. It is one of the oldest parts of the city, and was formally made into a district in 1920. Due to its age, vestiges of the city's Spanish era remain today in the district's Monumental Zone or the old quarter. The area has formed part of the Cultural heritage of Peru since 1972, and since 1988 has been part of the Historic Centre of Lima, a World Heritage Site.

== Etymology ==
The name of the district comes from one of two sources: either the Aymara language lima-limaq (meaning "yellow flower"), or the Spanish pronunciation of the Quechua word rimaq (meaning "talker", and actually written and pronounced limaq in the Quechua I languages). The same Quechua word is also the source of the name given to the river that feeds the city, the Rímac River (pronounced as in the politically dominant Quechua II languages, with an "r" instead of an "l"). Early maps of Peru show both names (Lima and Ciudad de los Reyes) displayed jointly.

It was known until the 19th century as San Lázaro', a neighbourhood of Lima District. Prior to that, it was called "the neighbourhood on the other side of the bridge" (Spanish: Bajo el puente).

== History ==
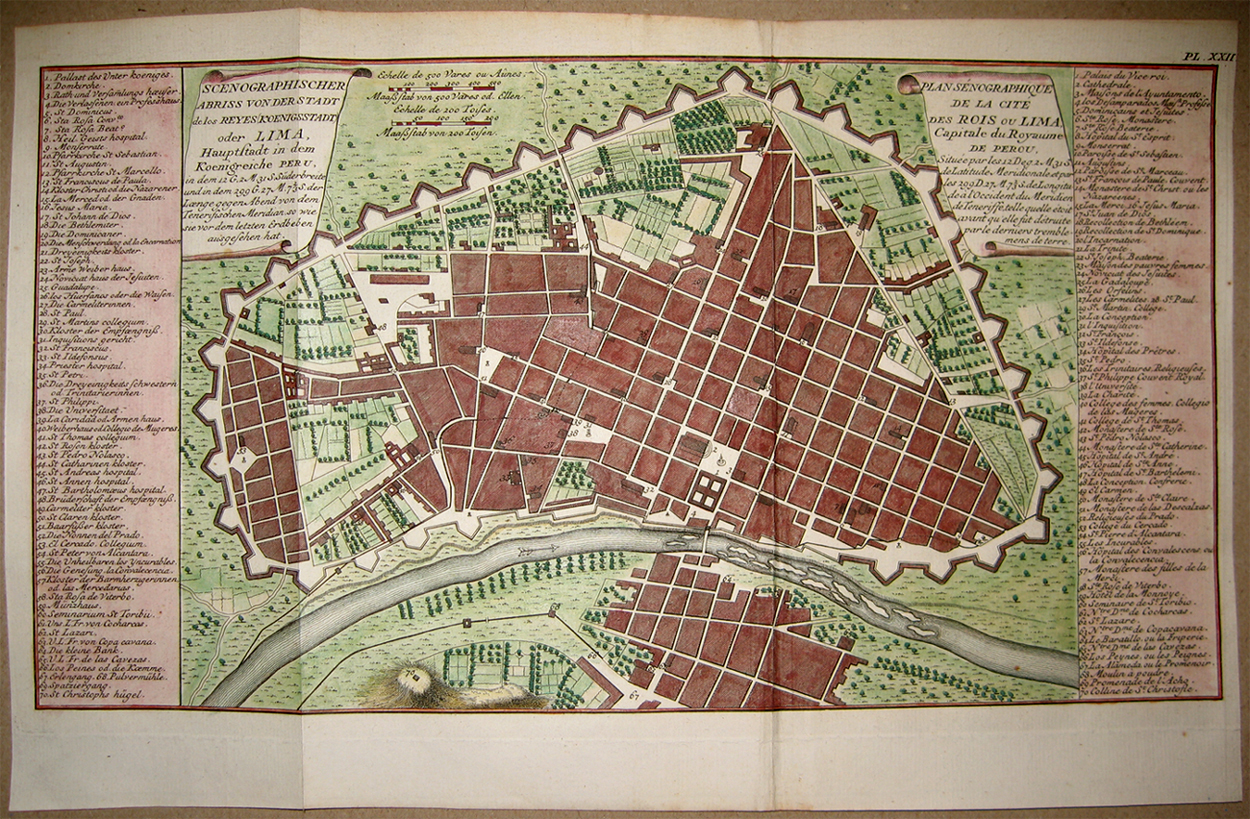
1750 map of Lima and its walls.

The city of Lima was founded by Francisco Pizarro on January 18, 1535, and given the name City of Kings. Nevertheless, its original name persisted with time.

The district was part of Lima District until its creation in 1920. Prior to that, it was a neighbourhood named after Saint Lazarus or after its location on the other side of the Puente de Piedra.

In 1988, UNESCO declared the historic centre of Lima a World Heritage Site for its originality and high concentration of historic monuments constructed during the viceregal era. In 2023, it was expanded with two exclaves to include the Quinta and Molino de Presa and the Ancient Reduction of Santiago Apostle of Cercado.

Like its southern counterpart, the district's historic quarter is divided by Trujillo Street, which connects with Union Street through the Puente de Piedra, the oldest bridge in the city. Its eastern side features the Plaza de Acho, the most famous bullfighting arena in South America and one of the most well known in the world. Looking directly from Ricardo Palma Bridge on downtown Lima district's East side, a large building with the logo of Cerveza Cristal, one of two famous Peruvian brands, can be seen. This was the main brewery until the Backus company moved operations to Ate in the 1990s. North of the plant is the Alameda de los Descalzos, a short boulevard with a large planted median leading into the Convento de los Descalzos. Built in the 18th century by the Spanish colonial government, it is one of the best features in this lower-middle-class district. Northern Rímac, or Amancaes, once romanticized in ballads as "La Flor de Amancaes", a hilly prairie, is now overrun with pueblos jóvenes (shanty towns). San Cristóbal hill, which is the highest point in Lima Province, is located in the district. The district's religious festivities include the Señor Crucificado del Rímac.

== Politics ==
Rímac is under the jurisdiction of its own district municipality, as well as that of the Metropolitan Municipality of Lima.

=== List of mayors ===
Since 2023, the incumbent mayor is Néstor de la Rosa.

№	Mayor	Party	Term	
№	Mayor	Party	Begin	End
1	Juan Bautista Nicolini Bollentini		1920	1920
2	José Jarrin		1920	1920
3	Armando Patiño		1920	1921
4	Juan Salazar		1922	1922
5	Víctor Arévalo		1922	1922
6	Abraham Castillo		1923	1924
7	Juan Ríos		1925	1929
8	Pedro Malatesta		1930	1931
9	Alberto Samamé		1931	1932
10	Daniel Carneiro		1932	1932
11	César Saavedra		1932	1932
12	Pío Delgado		1932	1933
13	Emiliano Morán		1933	1933
14	Augusto Thorndike		1934	1939
15	Jorge Albertini		1940	1944
16	Tomás Vidal		1945	1946
17	Augusto Hinostroza		1947	1947
18	Augusto Thorndike		1947	1947
19	Manuel Vento		1948	1949
20	César Saavedra		1950	1950
21	Andrés Indacochea		1950	1950
22	César Saavedra		1950	1955
23	Nicolás Macedo		1956	1957
24	Pedro Tello		1958	1961
25	Ricardo Espinosa		1962	1963
26	Carlos Alva Sánchez	APRA–UNO	1964	1966
27	Percy Hartley Román	APRA–UNO	1967	1969
28	Carlos Morales		1970	1976
29	Godofredo Ramírez		1977	1979
30	Antonio Fernández		1980	1981
31	José Delgado Arena	Acción Popular	1981	1983
32	Juan Villanueva Flores	Izquierda Unida	1984	1986
33	Juan Carlos Yance Salvador	APRA	1987	1989
34	Armando Lerma Santos	FREDEMO	1990	1992
35	Raúl Soto Herrera	OBRAS	1993	1995
36	José Navarro Lévano	Somos Lima	1996	1998
37	Gloria Jaramillo Aguilar	Somos Perú	1999	2002
38	Luis Lobatón Donayre	Unidad Nacional	2003	2006
39	Víctor Leyton Díaz	Unidad Nacional	2007	2010
40	Enrique Peramás Díaz	Somos Perú	2011	2014
41	Enrique Peramás Díaz	Solidaridad Nacional	2015	2018
42	Pedro Rosario Tueros	Acción Popular	2019	2022
43	Néstor de la Rosa	Podemos Perú	2023	2026

=== Subdivisions ===
As of 1993, Rímac is divided into the following urban areas or neighbourhoods:

- Caqueta
- Alameda de los Descalzos
- Cerro Palomares
- Ciudad y Campo
- El Bosque
- El Manzano
- Huascarán
- Huerta Guinea
- La Florida
- La Huerta
- Las Totoritas
- Leoncio Prado
- Perricholi
- Rímac
- Santa Candelaria
- Santa Rosa
- Ventura Rossi
- Villacampa

=== Twin cities ===
As of 2025, Lima is twinned with 24 cities in Europe, the Americas and Asia.

== Geography ==
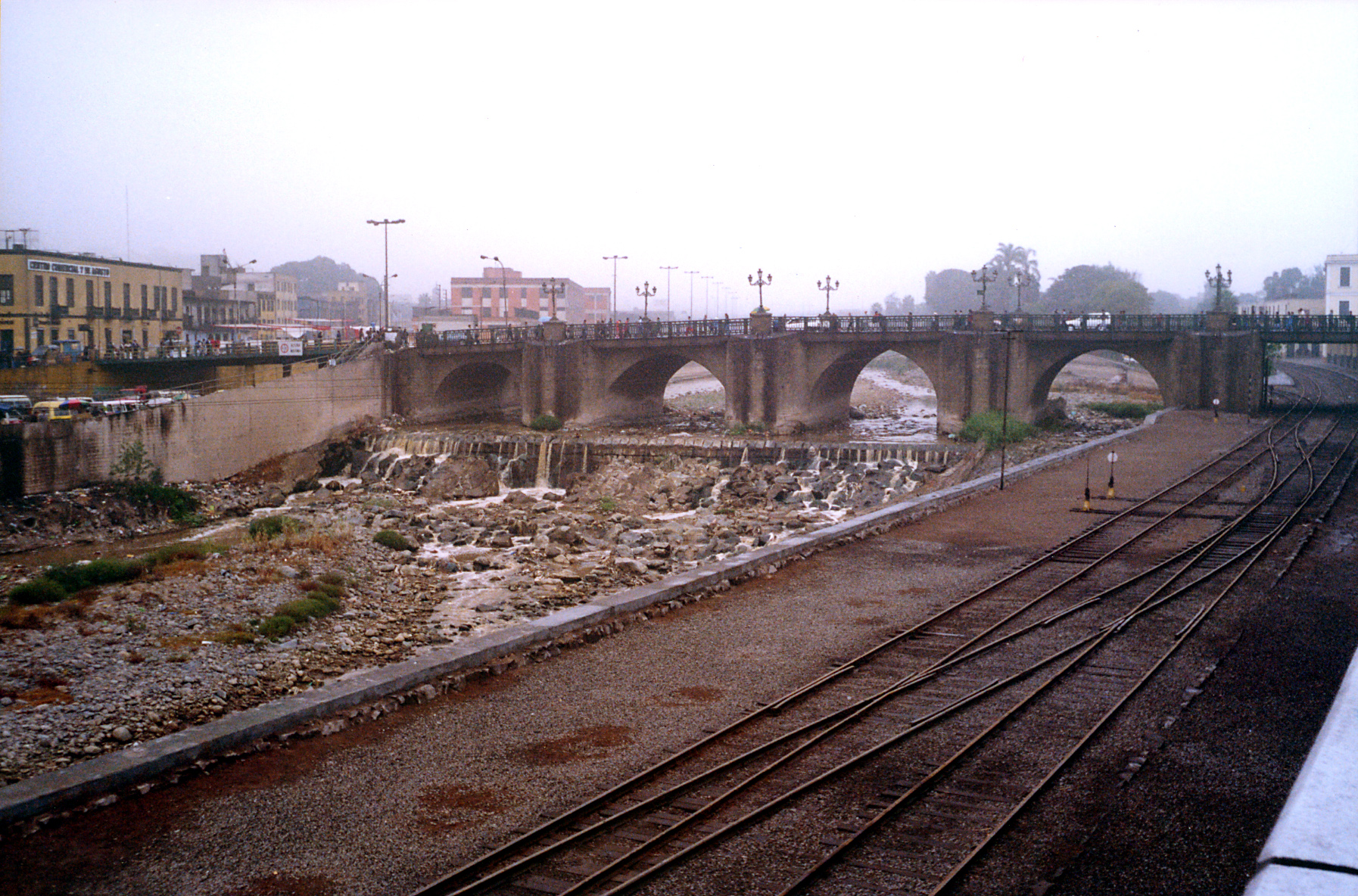
The Puente de Piedra crosses the river, connecting both districts.

The district has a total land area of 11.87 km^{2}. Its administrative centre is located at 154 meters above sea level. It is part of Lima's Cono Centro, an unofficial subregion of the city.

=== Boundaries ===
- North: Independencia District
- East: San Juan de Lurigancho District
- South: Lima District, to which it is connected by six bridges over the Rímac River
- West: San Martín de Porres District

=== Climate ===
Climate data for Lima
Month	Jan	Feb	Mar	Apr	May	Jun	Jul	Aug	Sep	Oct	Nov	Dec	Year
Record high °F	79	79	79	75	72	68	66	64	66	68	72	75	72
Record high °C	26	26	26	24	22	20	19	18	19	20	22	24	22
Average precipitation days	1	1	0	0	1	2	3	3	3	2	2	0	16
Average rainy days	4	2	3	2	5	11	12	15	13	7	5	3	82
Average relative humidity (%)	85	80	80	85	85	85	85	85	85	85	85	85	84.2
Mean monthly sunshine hours	179.1	169	139.2	184	116.4	50.6	28.6	32.3	37.3	65.3	89	139.2	1,284
Source: Weatherbase (Temperature, precipitation and humidity). and Universidad Complutense de Madrid (Sunlight)

== Culture ==
One of the district's former festivities was that of the Nativity of John the Baptist, celebrated at the Pampa de Amancaes, a field once known for its flowers of the same name.

=== Landmarks ===
The Historic Centre of Lima is located within the district. The World Heritage Site declared by UNESCO in 1988 is divided into three sites, of which two (one partially) are located in Rímac District. The Plaza de toros de Acho (a bull ring) and the Paseo de Aguas (a promendade) are located in the district.

== Transport ==
The district is serviced by the Metropolitano bus system. A line of the Lima and Callao Metro has been planned since 2010.

== See also ==
- Administrative divisions of Peru
