= Balconies of Lima =

Spanish Colonial architectural features in Peru

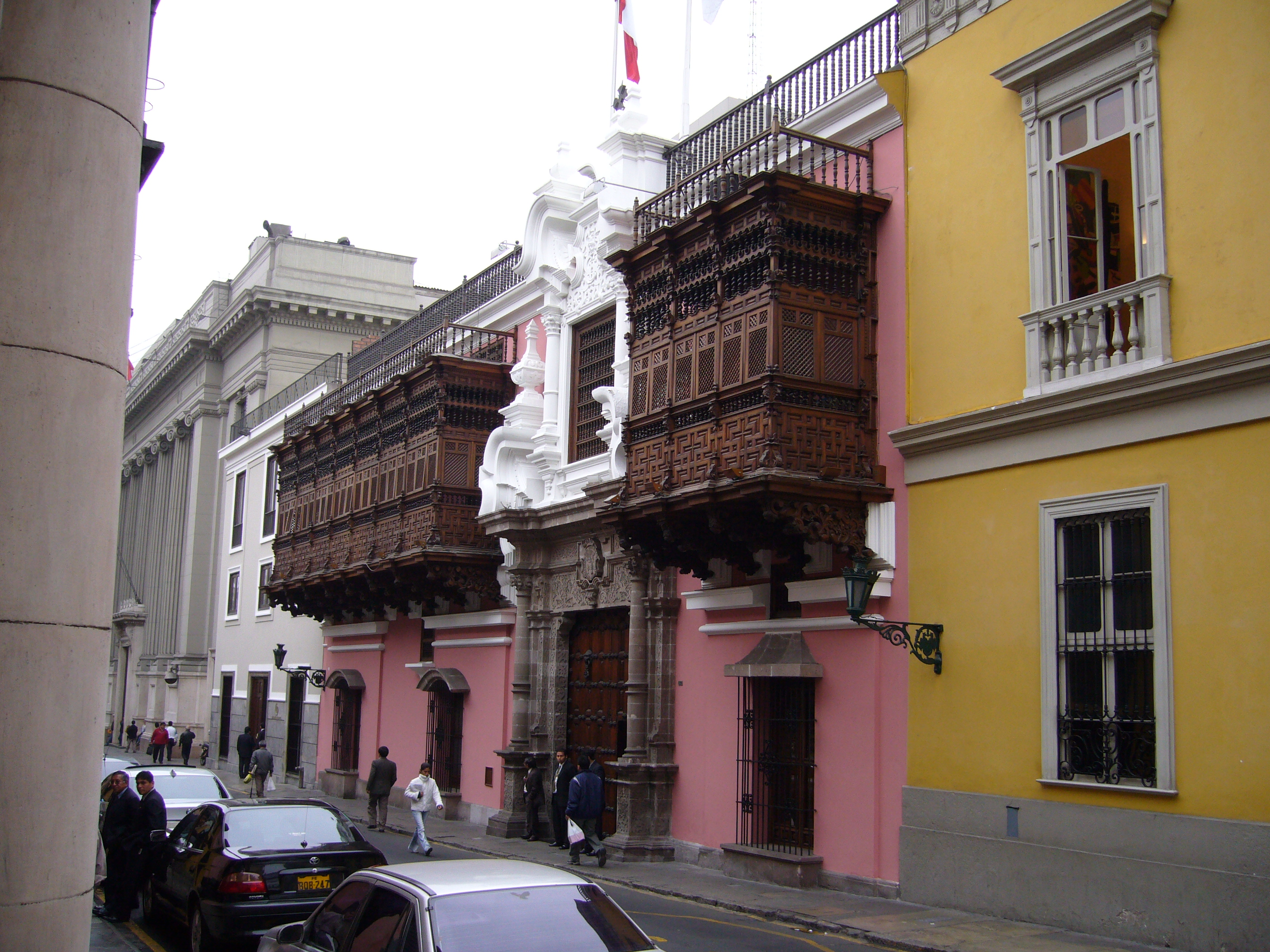
Facade of the Colonial Palacio de Torre Tagle with porches and carved stone arches and richly art carved wooden balconies

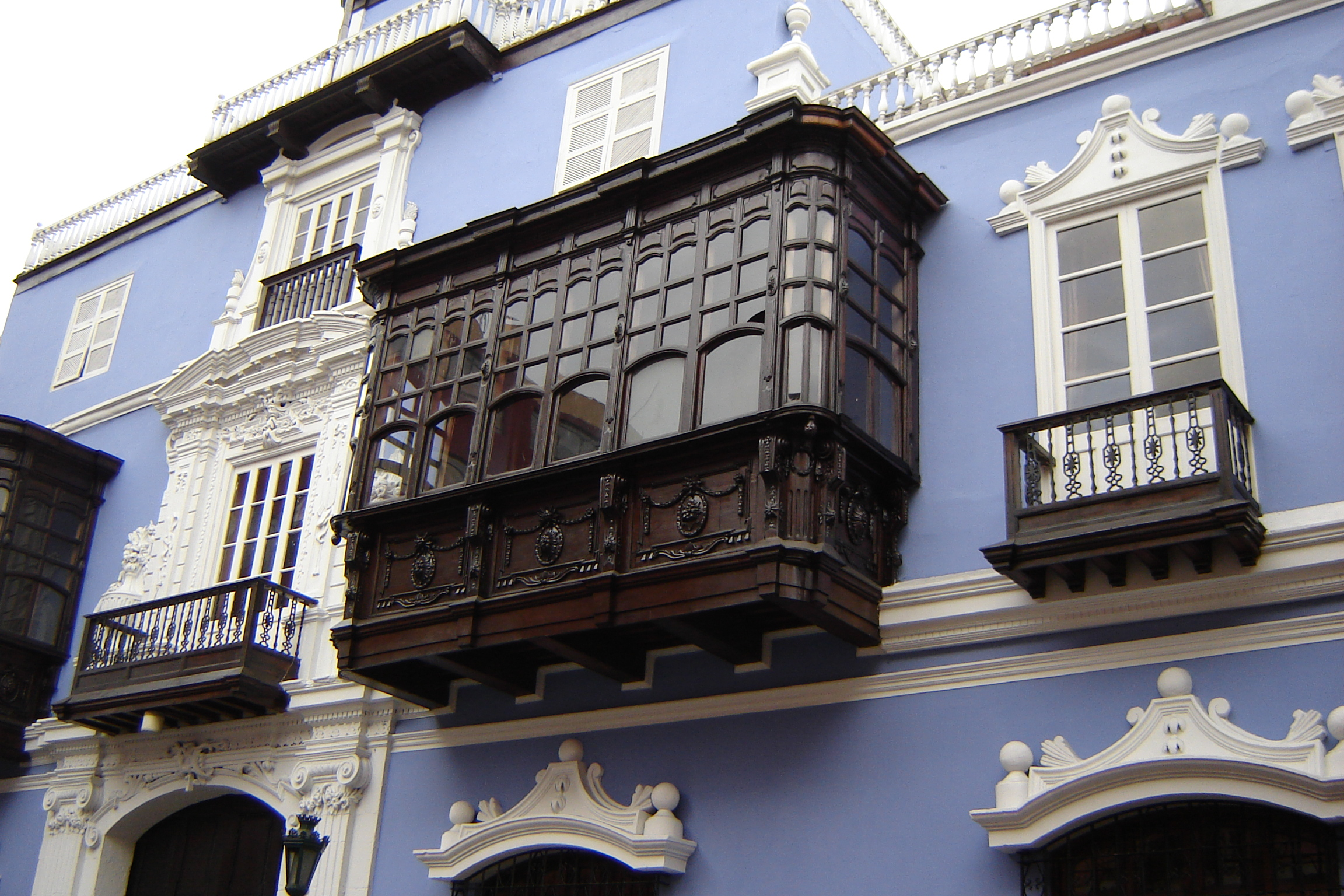
Colonial balconies of the Casa de Osambela

The balconies of Lima are items of cultural heritage built during the Viceroyalty of Peru and the Republic of Peru. Most of these balconies are of the Viceroyalty period, built in the late 17th and 18th centuries, are located in the Historic Center of Lima. They were adapted for residential purposes and have influenced the lives of many Peruvian scholars such as the 19th century writer Ricardo Palma.

The balconies have been crucial in UNESCO's declaration of the Historic Center of Lima as a World Heritage Site.

== Colonial architecture ==
Peruvian colonial architecture in the Viceroyalty of Peru developed in the 16th to the 19th century, when Latin America was conquered by the Spaniards. Balconies in Lima were built in the Renaissance, Baroque, Neoclassical and Neo-Baroque styles and had Mediterranean, Moorish and Andalusian influences.

The Renaissance and Baroque styles emerged as a result of European influence. The Renaissance idea that the nobility of a building characterized a city's grandiosity permeated in Lima's architecture. Baroque architecture of this period, characterized by exuberance and heavy ornamentation, is prevalent as well. In the 18th century, the Rococo style permeated in Lima, as a result of French influence. This style embraced ornamentation and playful themes. Casa Goyeneche, built in 1863, is noted for its French influence.

The Moors also influenced Peruvian architecture. Closed wooden balconies, also called miradores, were inherited from the Mashrabiya tradition of Moorish architecture, as the Moors occupied Southern Spain. The term mirar in Spanish translates to “to look”, indicating that the balconies give the residents an extensive view of the scenery (Bloom and Blair). However, Moorish styles became less popular when modern styles were adopted in Lima.

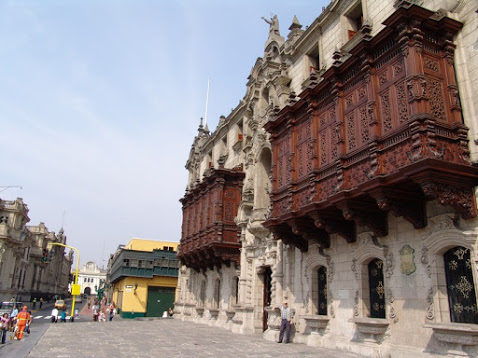
Office building with Balconies in Lima, this one in particular is Neo-Colonial.

== Construction ==
The main features of the balconies are the lattice, still and baluster. The wooden balconies projecting at upper levels also allow for privacy and air circulation, an essential feature for buildings in warmer countries. Non-rounded balconies were introduced in Spain in the 18th century. Balconies of the 15th to the 17th century are noted for their openness, while balconies built after that period are more closed. Sevillan azulejos and mosaics are used in the construction of the balconies.

== Social function ==
In the 18th century, viceroys would stand on the balconies to address the colonists. In churches, the balconies also provided abbesses the chance to observe Mass while avoid being seen.

Balconies merge the interior and exterior spaces of a city, a feature borrowed from Islamic architecture. The balconies in Lima have been compared to "streets in the sky" and they function as a link between private homes and Limeño streets. Antonio de la Calancha and Juan Meléndez first coined the term, writing, "They are so many and too large that they seem to be streets on the air."

Although the balconies were originally built to shield women of nobility from voyeuristic gazes, they were also sites of gossip and amorous encounters. The balconies gave the women a chance to see the city but remain hidden at the same time.

Historian Charles Walker has interpreted the balconies as a manifestation of social power dynamics, as they illustrate the distinction between individuals of different classes. In the 18th century, churches and houses with grandiose balconies were indicative of affluent owners, even though the balconies were built in similar styles and materials.

== Restoration efforts ==
=== Impact of earthquakes ===
The earthquakes of 1655, 1687, 1746 and 1940 destroyed many of the old colonial structures in Lima designed by Francisco Pizarro and transformed the city's politics and architecture. Sturdy and less elaborate styles became increasingly popular after 1746 in order to ensure the stability of buildings. After the earthquake of 1940, Bruno Roselli, a Florentine art history professor known as the "defender of balconies", endeavored to salvage numerous balconies, many of which were of the 17th and 18th century styles. So committed was he to their salvation that he compared the balconies' importance to that of the Eiffel Tower, Statue of Liberty and the lions in Trafalgar Square. However, he was not successful.

=== Adopt a Balcony ===
The restoration of Lima's balconies was spearheaded by Alberto Andrade, Lima's mayor from 1996 to 2002. His Adopt a Balcony program saw various foreign embassies, companies and individuals partaking in preserving the balconies in exchange for tax breaks. These efforts have revived Lima's consciousness of its identity as the a City of Balconies, a term first coined by architect Adolfo Vargas. The abundance of these balconies adds to the particular harmony and originality to this part of the city.

== List of notable Colonial palaces with Lima balconies ==
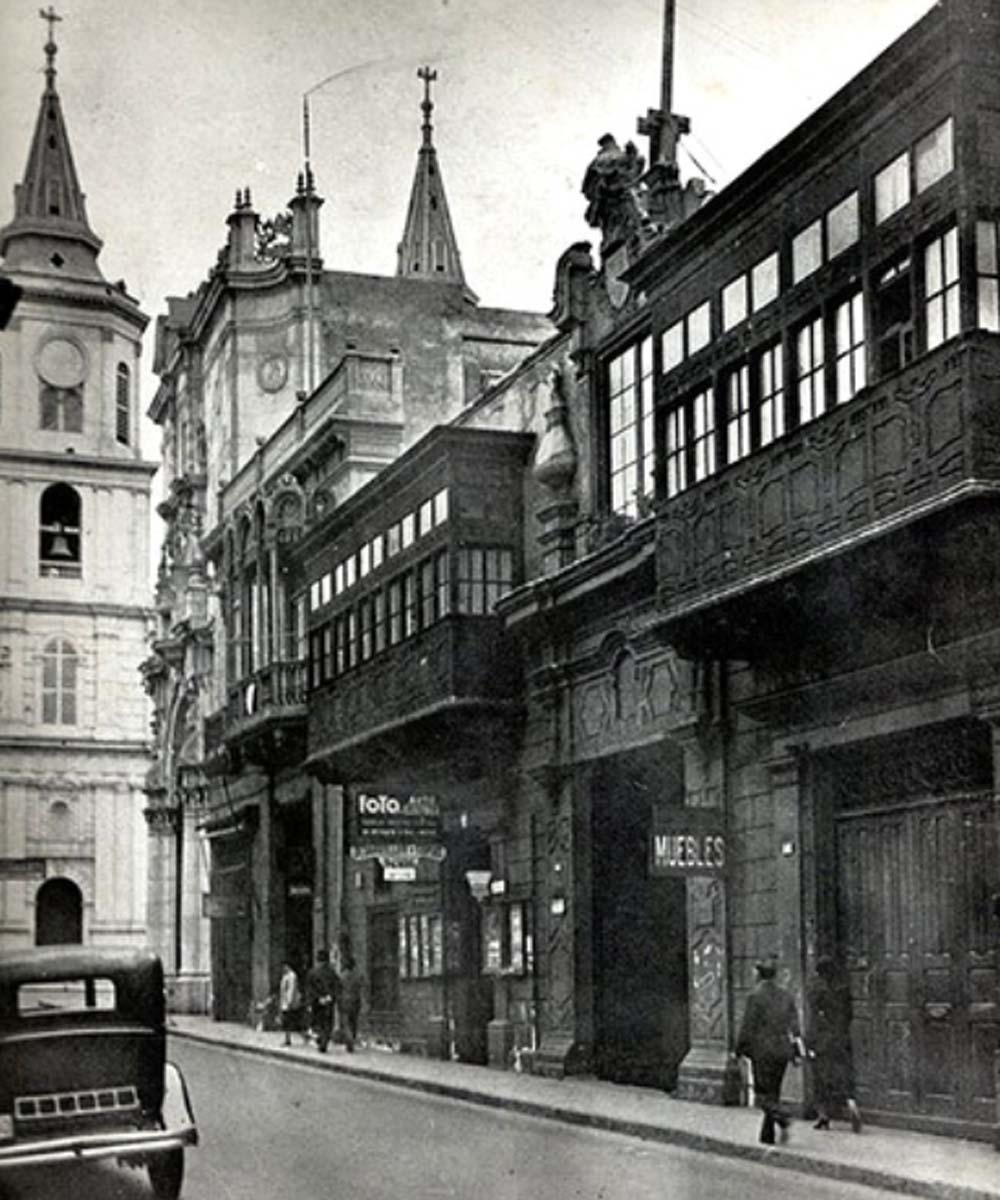
Casa Goyeneche

- Palacio de Torre Tagle
- Casa de Osambela
- Across the street from Torre Tagle, Casa Goyeneche (also called Casa de Rada) is another impressive 18th-century mansion, with distinct French influences. Other interesting similar sites that are nearby (in downtown Lima) are:
- Casa Negreiros, Jr. Azángaro 532
- Casa de las Trece Monedas, Jr. Ancash 536
- Casa Barbieri, Jr. Callao at Jr. Rufino Torrico
- Casa de Pilatos, Jr. Áncash 390
- Casa la Riva, Jr. Ica 426

== In popular culture ==
Mario Vargas Llosa's play, The Madmen of the Balconies, is centered around the balconies. Its protagonist, Aldo Brunelli attempts to salvage them from destruction. Evelyn Fishburn has noted that the play provides a good overview of the defenders of history and those who push for modernism. Brunelli's name is an amalgamation of Bruno Roselli.

The City of Balconies is the setting to Jim Crace's novel Six, published by Viking in 2003. The city in the novel is imaginary.

== See also ==
- Balconies of Cusco
- Balcony
- Bay window
