= Peruvian colonial architecture =

Architectural style combining European styles with the local Peruvian reality

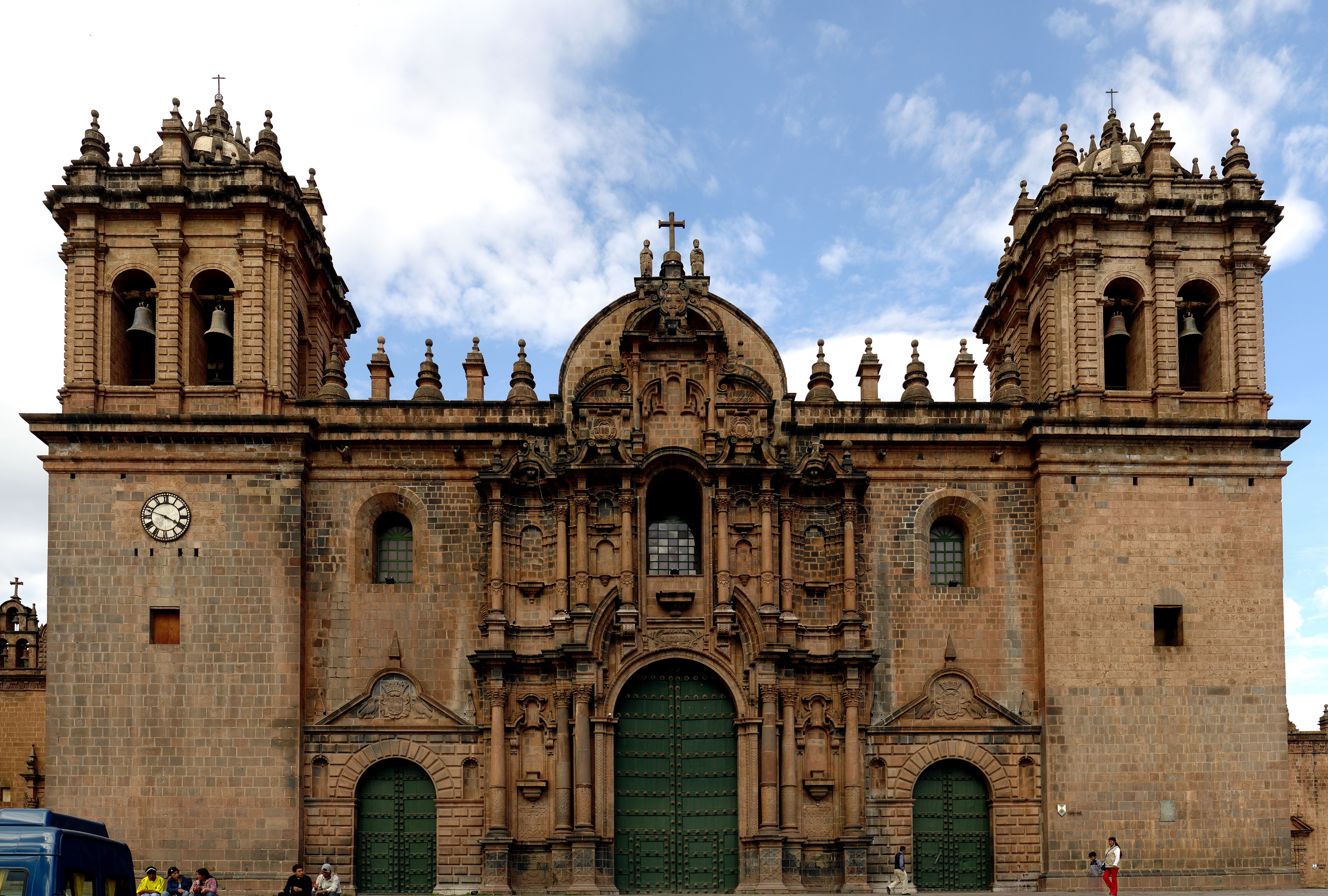
Cathedral of Cusco. Andean Baroque style of plateresque xiloformo

Peruvian colonial architecture developed in the Viceroyalty of Peru between the 16th and 19th centuries. It was characterized by the importation and adaptation of European architectural styles to Peru, yielding original architecture.

Academia views the Spanish architectural and religious takeover either as complete and swift, or meaningfully influenced by indigenous traditions.

The use of construction systems such as the quincha and ornamentations from Andean iconography give Peruvian viceroyal architecture an identity.

== Renaissance style ==
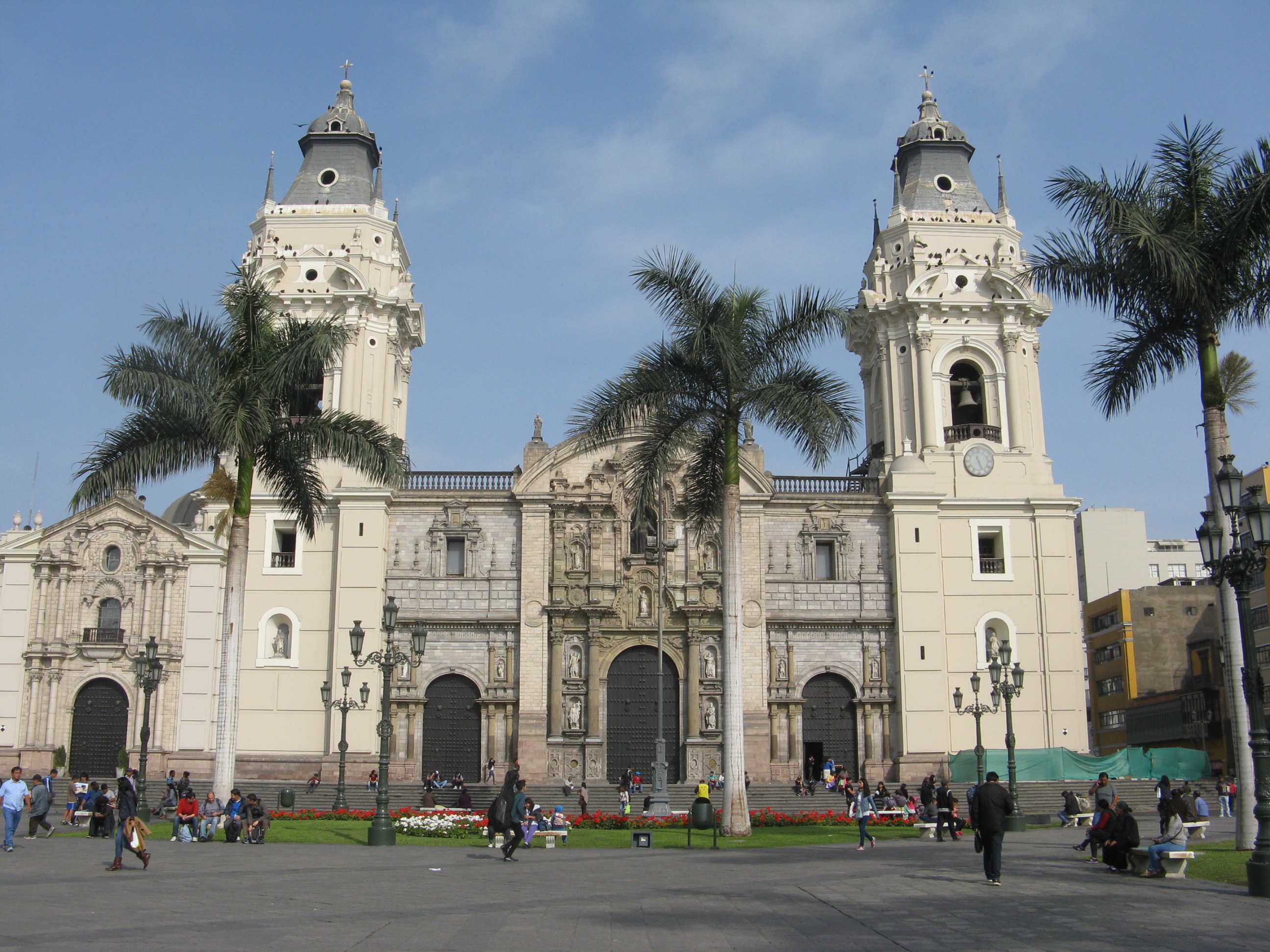

The early days of the Viceroyalty featured the Renaissance style, which had evolved in Europe following the Italian Renaissance. This style was characterized by the use of ornaments and watermarks that present architectural lines like chiseled works of silver, hence the name plateresque. Art blends Gothic, Romanesque and Arabic styles from the 16th to mid-17th century. This style survives in the Lima facades of the Cathedral of Lima, the Casa de Pilatos, and (in Ayacucho) the facades of the churches of San Francisco and La Merced.

== Baroque style ==
The Baroque was distinguished by heavy ornamentation, of predominantly curved lines, giving an aspect of free movement. Predominant decorative elements include modified columns, pilasters, cornices classical forms. The Greek columns lose their purity due to the addition of spiraling, thick snakes.

A characteristic example is the rustication that appears on the walls of the Monastery of San Francisco, Lima. This style prevailed from the middle of the 17th to the late 18th century. Representative examples are found in Lima, the Torre Tagle Palace, and the churches of San Francisco and San Marcelo. In Cuzco the Cathedral of Cuzco (Andean Baroque), the churches of Santo Domingo and San Sebastián reflect this tradition. In Arequipa the Church of La Compañía is Baroque.

== Andean Baroque ==
During the late seventeenth and eighteenth century in the southern Andes (Southern Peru and Bolivia) a style developed that blended European Baroque with indigenous (Inca, Aymara) features such as the kantuta flower and Inka maskaypacha crown as well as native flora and fauna (Arequipa papayas and the Chiguanco thrush). It was created by primarily by indigenous sculptors, sometimes inspired by textile patterns. The new style appeared primarily on the stone carved facades of churches and palaces, first in Arequipa and later around Lake Titicaca, Oruro and Chile. It was one of the most vigorous combinations of styles in all of colonial Latin America. The most important buildings are the Church of La Compañía and Puno Cathedral.

=== Churrigueresque baroque ===
It was the ornate Baroque and distinguished by the use of whimsical ornaments and was associated with the Spanish architect named José de Churriguera. Examples of this style in Lima include the facade of churches of Nuestra Señora de la Merced and San Agustín.

=== Rococo ===
In the 18th century, the French Bourbon dynasty spread to Spain this style, characterized by non-rounded balconies, the decrease of ornaments on columns (these are less twisted).

Examples of rococo include the Quinta de Presa, the Casa de Larriva (rococo facade but Granadian), the Casa de las Trece Monedas (rococo facade Lima), the Osambela House and Paseo de Aguas, all located in Lima.

== Neoclassical style ==
In the late 18th and early 19th century came the style called neoclassical, which was characterized by the return of the classic styles of Greco-Roman architecture (using Romanesque columns with Corinthian capitals and without ornamentation, straight lines and simplicity in them, in addition to a triangular frontispiece).

Examples of this style are the altar and the towers of the Cathedral of Lima, the facade of the Basilica and Convent of San Pedro, the main altar of the Basilica and Convent of San Francisco, pilasters of the Osambela House, the facade of Fort Santa Catalina and Presbyter Matías Maestro Cemetery.

== See also ==
- Architecture of Peru
- Balconies of Lima
- List of architectural styles
