= Bar Cordano =

Historical building and bar in Peru

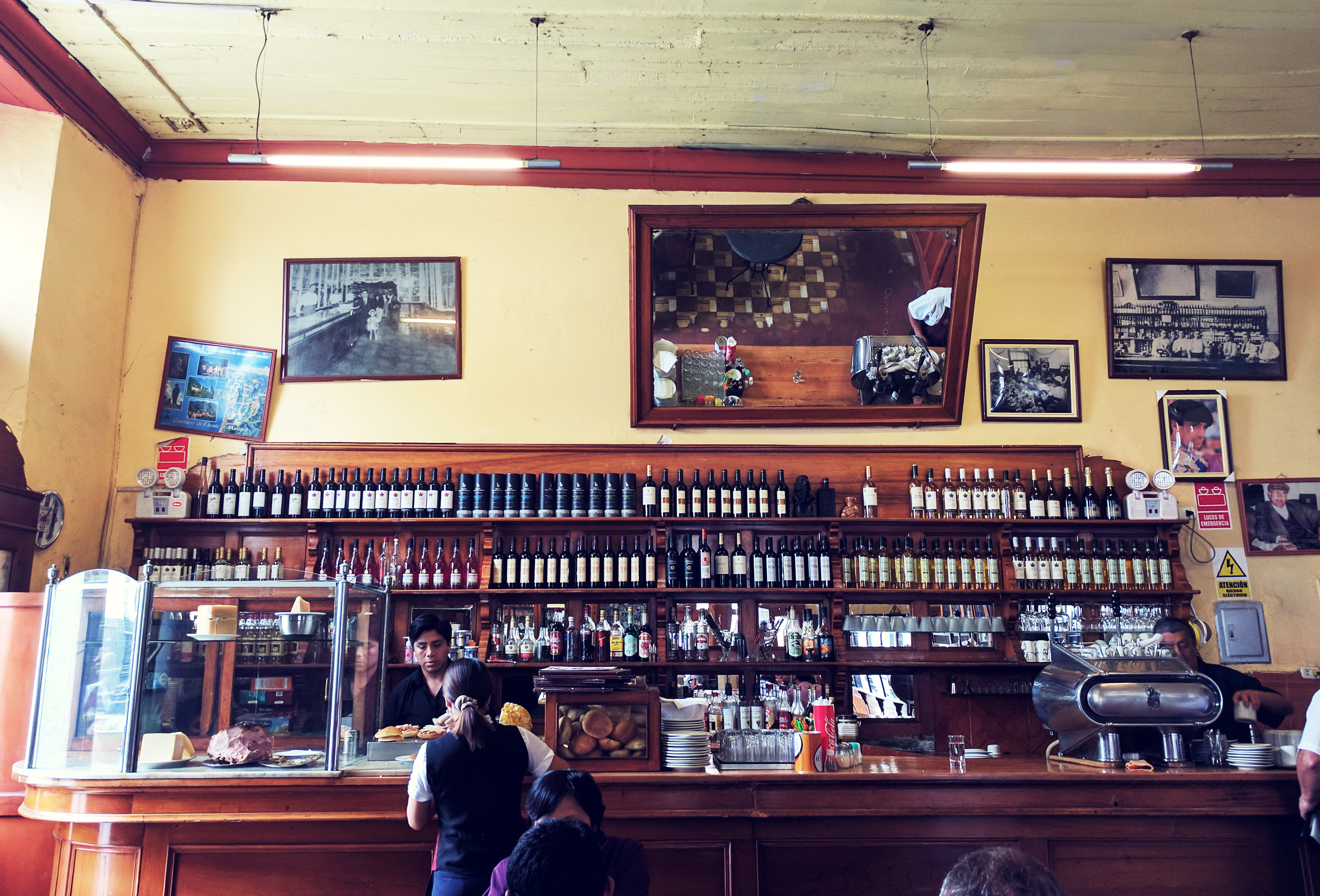
- Founded: 1905

The Bar Cordano is a restaurant and bar located next to Desamparados station and Government Palace, at the corner of Carabaya and Áncash streets in the historic centre of Lima, Peru. It is located in the first floor of the former Hotel Comercio.

Due to its proximity to Government Palace, almost all presidents of Peru have dined in the restaurant since its inception.

== History ==
The establishment was founded in 1905 by the Italians Vigilio Botano and brothers Luis and Antonio Cordano, on the first floor of the Hotel Comercio, known for a murder that took place on June 24, 1930. It belonged to its original owners for 73 years, being ceded to its workers in 1978. The Cordano family lived in front of the bar, in what today is the Bodega y Quadra Museum.

It was declared part of the Cultural heritage of Peru on April 26, 1989.

== See also ==
- Peruvian cuisine
- Pulpería
