= Rafael Marquina =

Rafael Marquina may refer to:

- Rafael Marquina (Peruvian architect) (1884-1964), Peruvian architect
- Rafael Marquina (Spanish architect) (1921-2013), Spanish designer and architect
