= Rafael Marquina (Peruvian architect) =

Peruvian architect (1884–1964)

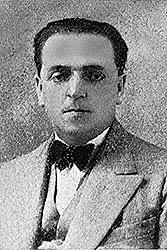
- Born: José Rafael Ernesto Marquina y Bueno; February 9, 1884; Lima, Peru
- Died: April 22, 1964 (aged 80); Lima, Peru
- Resting place: El Ángel Cemetery
- Education: Guadalupe School; Cornell University
- Occupations: Architect, educator

José Rafael Ernesto Marquina y Bueno (Lima; February 9, 1884 — April 22, 1964) was a prominent Peruvian architect during the early 20th century. His contributions to Peruvian architecture remain to this day in the city's historic centre, having also contributed as an educator at the School of Fine Arts and the School of Engineers.

== Early life ==
Marquina was born in Lima, the son of Sea captain José Manuel de la Asunción Marquina y Dávila Condemarín and Isabel Bueno y Ortíz de Zevallos. He was baptised on March 11, 1884, at the Church of the Orphans. He had four siblings: engineer Luis Manuel, Manuela, Victoria and Isabel, with whom he lived for most of his life. In April 1891, he started his education, which was continued in 1897 at the College of Our Lady of Guadalupe.

In 1902 he travelled to the United States, where he worked for two years as a draftsman in a locomotive factory in Philadelphia. In 1904, he started studying architecture at Cornell University, in Ithaca, New York with the financial assistance of his brother Luis Guillermo. He was awarded three medals in recognition of his architectural works, graduating in 1909.

== Career ==
After completing his university studies Marquina returned to Peru and on October 6, 1909, he began working as an architect in the Technical Section of the Directorate of Public Works of the then Ministry of Development. His tasks in this department were the preparation of projects, expert reports and appraisals, as well as the inspection of the different works of said ministry carried out in the country. Thus, in his capacity as State Architect, he was commissioned to complete the interiors of the College of Our Lady of Guadalupe. The most important work designed and executed in this department by Marquina was the Desamparados station for the Central Railway of Peru, designed in 1911. In 1914 Marquina resigned his position in the Ministry of Public Works as he had been appointed architect of the Charity of Lima.

Marquina began working at the Charity of Lima on January 16, 1914, as head of the Public Works Department, replacing the architect Claude Sahut. Among the tasks entrusted to Marquina were the preparation of projects, reconstructions, appraisals, measurements and inspections of the works undertaken by this agency. He also received different commissions, including care-type buildings such as the Loayza Hospital and the Pérez Araníbar Orphanage, high-rise residential-commercial buildings in consolidated areas of the city, and workers' houses that faced the problem of popular housing. Finally, in 1942 Marquina was relieved of his position as head of the Department of Public Works by the architect Luis Miró Quesada Garland and was then appointed consulting architect, a position he held until 1952, the year in which he definitively left that institution.

Parallel to his professional work, Marquina carried out an important teaching activity at both the National School of Fine Arts and the School of Engineers, both in Lima. When the former was created on September 28, 1918, during the government of José Pardo y Barreda, Marquina was called to be part of the teaching staff of this school, which is why he was appointed on March 22, 1919, that is as well as he is counted as one of its founders. In said school he was in charge of the course "Elements of architecture and perspective" until 1928, the year in which he joined the School of Engineers as a teacher.

Marquina joined the School of Engineers as interim professor of the "General and Room Architecture" course, replacing the architect Enrique Bianchi. In 1931, when a reform was undertaken at the school, Marquina was named part of a commission in charge of reformulating the curriculum of the Construction Architects Section. From then on he acquired greater importance in said section, so in 1935 he was appointed professor of the course "Architecture of the room" and in 1937 he was appointed head of the course "Architectural Projects". On April 1, 1942, he was appointed head of the Special Section of Construction Architects and after the 1946 reform, which converted the sections of the school into departments, on May 11 of that year he was appointed head of the Department of Architecture, a position which he held until April 17, 1951, when he was replaced by Fernando Belaúnde Terry.

== Selected works ==
- Casa Fari, Chosica, 1911
- General Cemetery of Jauja, Jauja, 1911
- Estación de Desamparados, Lima, 1911–1912
- Hospital Arzobispo Loayza, Lima, project: 1915, construction: 1924
- Puericultorio Pérez Araníbar, project: 1917, construction: 1929
- Gran Hotel Bolívar, Lima, 1923–1924, expansion in 1938
- Portals of the Plaza San Martín, Lima, 1926–1940
- Edificio Ferrand, Lima, 1928
- Casa de obreros N.ºs 1, 2, 3, 4; Barrios Altos, 1928–1934
- Edificio Tambo de Belén, Lima, 1930
- Chapel at the Presbyter Matías Maestro Cemetery, Lima, 1930
- Casa Graña, Jesús María, Lima, 1931
- Casa de obreros N.ºs 5, 6, 7, 8, 9, 10, 11, 12; Barrios Altos, 1934–1935
- Edificio Wilson–Colmena, Lima, project: 1937, construction; 1946
- Nueva Maternidad de Lima, Barrios Altos, 1939 (project)

== Bibliography ==
- Álvarez Ortega, Syra (2006). La formación en arquitectura en el Perú, antecedentes, inicios y desarrollo hasta 1955 (in Spanish). Lima: Instituto de Investigación de la Facultad de Arquitectura, Urbanismo y Artes. ISBN 9972-794-11-3.
- García Bryce, José (1980). "La arquitectura en el Virreinato y la República". Historia del Perú (in Spanish). Vol. 12. Editorial Juan Mejía Baca.
- Jiménez Campos, Luis; Santiváñez Pimentel, Miguel (2005). Rafael Marquina, arquitecto (in Spanish). Lima: Instituto de Investigación de la Facultad de Arquitectura de la UNI. ISBN 9972-794-09-1. Archived from the original on 2008-05-07.
