= St. Clare's Monastery, Lima =

Church in Lima, Peru

Coordinates: 12.0482°S 77.0199°W

St. Clare's Monastery
- Monasterio de Santa Clara
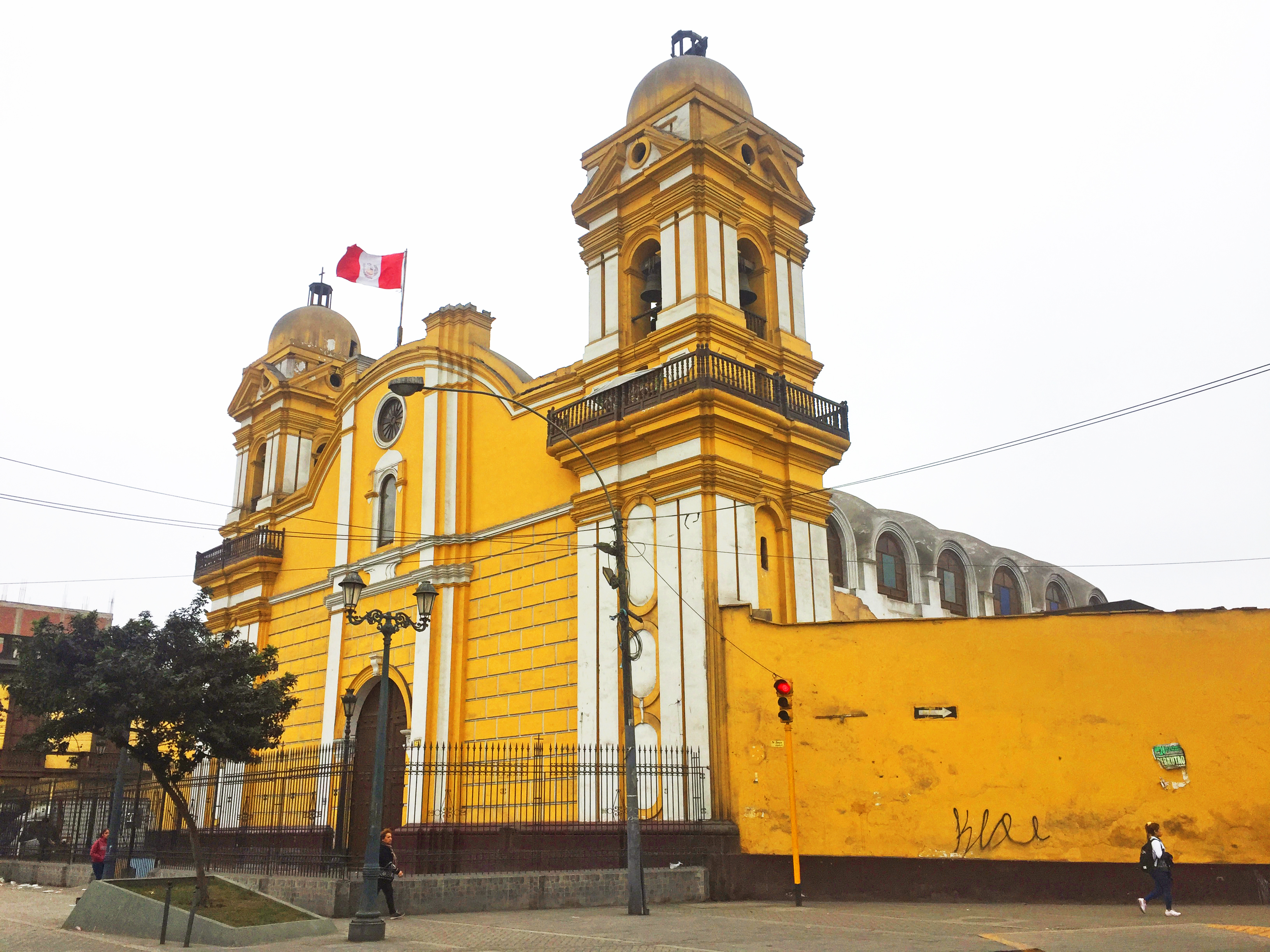
- The church in 2019

Religion
- Affiliation: Catholic
- Governing body: Archdiocese of Lima
- Leadership: Capuchin Poor Clares

Location
- Location: Jirón Jauja 449, Lima
- Interactive map of St. Clare's Monastery

Architecture
- Style: Spanish Revival
- Completed: 1606; 19th century

The Church and Convent of Our Lady of Peñafrancia (Spanish: Iglesia y Convento Máximo de Nuestra Señora de la Peña Francia), better known as St. Clare's Monastery (Spanish: Monasterio de Santa Clara), is a Catholic church, convent and monastery belonging to the Capuchin Poor Clares located in the neighbourhood of Barrios Altos, part of the historic centre of Lima, Peru.

The first building is from 1606, but the current church dates from the 19th century. The monastery still occupies a large part of the extensive block in which it is located, and which is surrounded by a number of streets: Cangallo to the west, Huánuco to the east (where the former St. Clare Mill is located), Junín to the south, and Jauja and Áncash to the north. It was declared a Historical Monument in 1972.

== Overview ==
The current temple and convent are works carried out in the 19th century. The façade has two twin towers in neoclassical style.

Its main altarpiece is in the Rococo style and was made in the 18th century. The Santa Clara Altarpiece is neoclassical, it was carved in the 19th century and includes in its main niche the effigy of Clare of Assisi, originally from the 18th century. For its part, the Cristo de Burgos is a piece from the 17th century with a chapel attached to the temple.

== History ==
Until 1596, on the site occupied by the current church there was a hermitage dedicated to Our Lady of Peñafrancia. That same year the construction of the new church and the monastery began, which took about a decade. The temple was inaugurated on August 10, 1605, as a convent for nuns of the Colettine Poor Clares. Its founding patrons were Archbishop Turibius of Mogrovejo, who was the highest authority of the Church in the Viceroyalty of Peru, and the Portuguese Francisco Saldaña, who gave his entire estate to benefit the foundation.

On September 6, 1591, Archbishop Mogrovejo wrote a letter to King Philip II, who gave his approval for the foundation to be carried out through a Royal Decree that arrived on May 10, 1592. Subsequently, he asked Pope Clement VIII the entry of four nuns from the Monastery of La Encarnación.

In 1596, through a provincial bull, he authorized the Archdiocese of Lima to found a monastery "mainly for women where the observance of an exemplary life was introduced." The nuns were under the Rule of Santa Clara but could have property and income due to the reform of Pope Urban IV.

Originally it consisted of an agglomeration of cells and hermitages that formed intricate alleys, and the monastery's extensive garden. The main cloister was built only in 1627, and the church, between 1643 and 1646. Projected towards the Jirón Ancash, the temple had a small side doorway (similar to the Prado church) and a single tower, which survived the demolition almost of the church in the 20th century to align the route of the aforementioned road, its current façade (which includes another replica of the original tower) being of neocolonial style.

In the 1970s, a cadastre from the National University of Engineering reported an imminent threat of destruction. On December 28, 1972, it was declared a Historical Monument of Religious Cult.

=== St. Clare Mill ===
St. Clare Mill
- Molino de Santa Clara
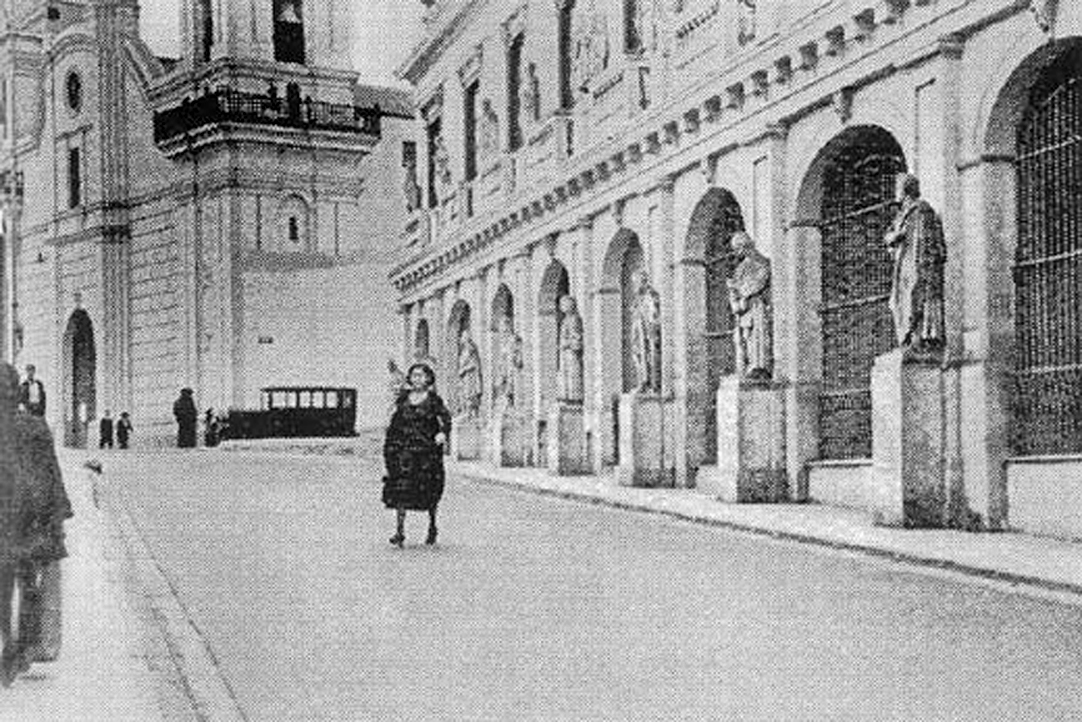
- The mill in the early 20th century
- Interactive map of the St. Clare Mill area

General information
- Architectural style: Neoclassical
- Location: Jirón Ancash 982, Lima
- Completed: 16th century

Design and construction
- Architect: Luis Josué Rainusso

The former St. Clare Mill (Spanish: Molino de Santa Clara) is located on Jirón Ancash, next to the church's main entrance and the square of the same name. The neoclassical building was built on the site of a run-down mill that used the disappeared Huatica river, and was named after the church. It was declared a Historical Monument of Lima on January 23, 1973.

The building represents the Italian presence and influence that took over Lima during an era where said immigration was constant. Two members of said immigration wave were Luis Josué and Elías Rainusso, who arrived in 1845 with an inherited fortune, that was invested in a company. The former decided to renovate the then run-down building, culminating in the building that exists today. Prior to the purchase, it was owned by the hospital of the same name, who used it to bake bread for their patients.

A feature that was originally prominent in the building but that no longer exists were the seventeen statues that adorned the building's façade alongside the Jirón Áncash. These statues represented important figures of the history of Italy: the statues of Alessandro Volta, Andrea Doria, Raphael, Dante Alighieri, Michelangelo, Niccolò Machiavelli, Vittorio Alfieri and Galileo Galilei (as well as Miguel de Cervantes) were located at street level, while the statues of Victor Emmanuel, Marco Polo and Diogenes—the remaining five statues were mythological allegories—were located at balcony level.

After Luis' death, the statues were sold to Juan Levaggi, who resold them to different residents of Lima. Four of them are presently located at the Museum of Italian Art, four in the National Library of Peru at Abancay Avenue, two in the gardens of Pedro de Osma Museum, and one in the atrium of the Iglesia del Cercado. Thanks to inscriptions located in their base, it is known that Florentine sculptor Casoni sculpted six of the statues in 1865—those of Galileo, Michelangelo, Raphael, Dante and Cervantes—with said sculptures being of better quality than the rest.

During the War of the Pacific, the building served as a refuge for a large number of families escaping the occupation of Lima by the Chilean Army, as per the agreement made between both armies, the Italian flag above it protected the building as a foreign residence. It is currently the home of some twenty families of low income. Its current owners are the North American grandchildren of Fernando León de Vivero, member of the APRA Party.

== See also ==
- Historic Centre of Lima
- Barrios Altos
