= Casa de Osambela =

Building in Lima, Peru

Coordinates: 12.0439°S 77.0326°W

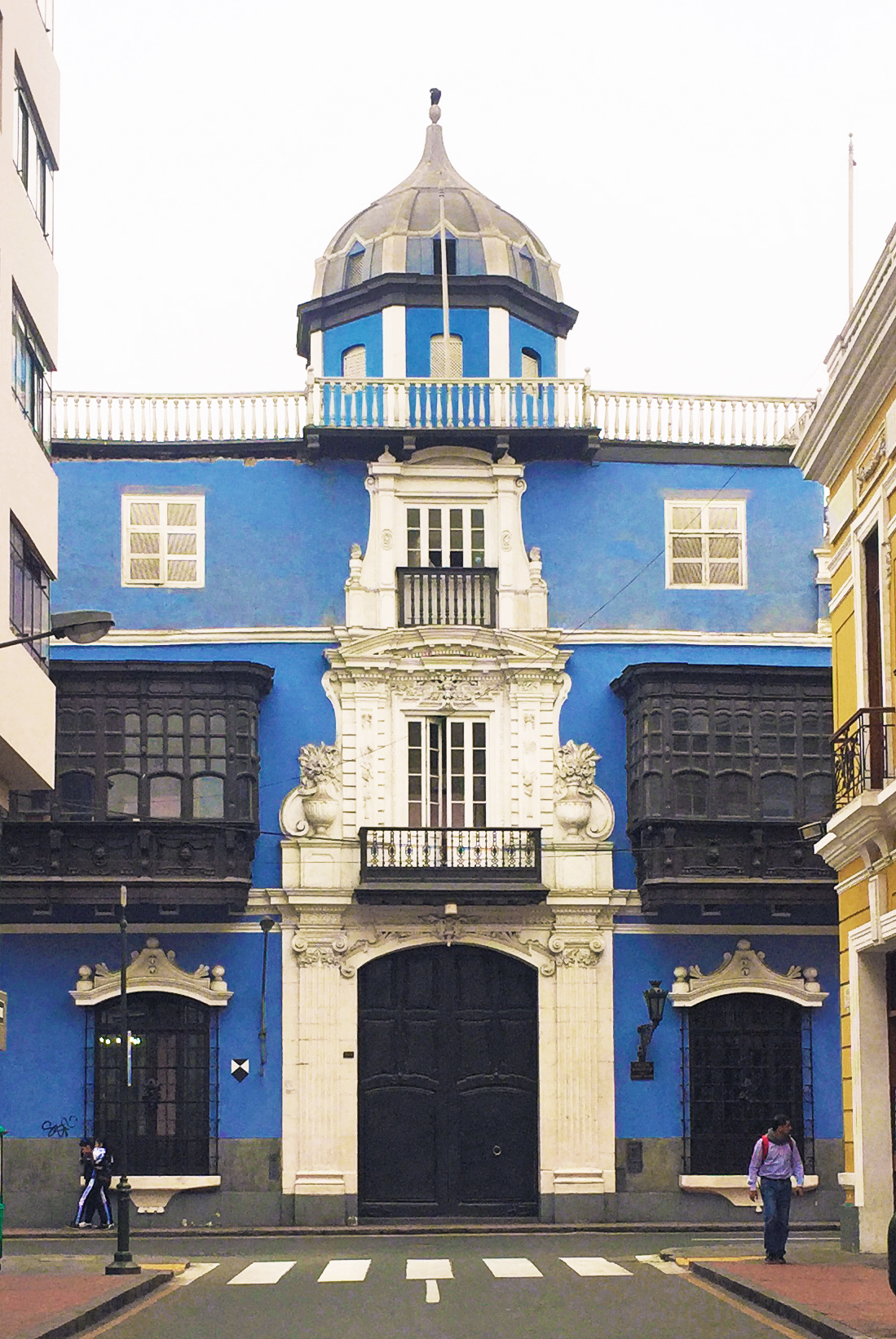
Façade

The Casa de Osambela, also known as the Casa de Oquendo, is a building built during the colonial era of Peru. It stands on the site of the old novitiate of the Dominican fathers, destroyed by the earthquake of 1746, and part of the garden, facing the Calle de la Veracruz (today Jirón Conde de Superunda) in the historic center of the city of Lima. It is one of the largest mansions in the center of Lima and is notable for its wide façade and excellent quality balconies.

It is a late colonial building with a mixture of successive styles, its construction dates from the late-18th and early-19th centuries. It was completed between 1803 and 1805.

== History ==
The land where the Casa de Osambela stands was owned by the Basilica of Santo Domingo and, in order to meet some payments and finish some works on the church that had remained unfinished, it was sold to the Spanish shipbuilder, banker and merchant Martín de Osambela, Marquis of Osambela and lieutenant colonel of militias. The lot bought by Osambela corresponded to the ruined and almost destroyed part of the novitiate.

In the Municipal Archive of Lima, Bernardo Moravsky found that Osambela had a carriage and barouche. Osambela in 1815 apparently must have become seriously ill, because he made a first will declaring that he had no heirs. But by a second testament, made in 1822, it is disclosed that he married Mariana de Ureta y Bermúdez, being the children of said marriage: María Mercedes, Mariana, José Valentín, Dolores and Cayetano.

Osambela married at a very mature age and was many years older than his wife, who was a lady of exceptional beauty. When the liberator, Don José de San Martín, arrived in Lima, Osambela put his house at his disposal for the great dance that the liberator offered to Lima society, having stayed there after proclaiming the Independence of Peru. Osambela died in the Real Felipe Fortress of Callao, where he took refuge with others in the times of José Ramón Rodil y Campillo.

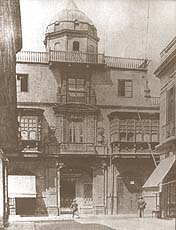
Casa de Osambela at the late-19th century (before the restoration)

From then on, the Osambela family was forced to rent the different facilities of the house as commercial premises and houses from whose income the widow and children lived. In 1840, an appraisal of the property was made, which valued the lower house at 28,620 pesos and the upper house at 41,364 pesos. Osambela's wife had to dispose of the property to pay off some debts and so, in 1854 the property passed into the hands of José de la Asunción Oquendo, who was a man of great renown; this led to the adoption of the name Casa de Oquendo, the name by which it is also known today.

The Oquendos were Basques and there were viscounts and marquises among them. María Rebeca de Oquendo, daughter of Don José de la Asunción Oquendo, was its last owner and on her death in 1941 the house became the property of the Caja de Ahorros de Lima. It was declared a National Monument in 1963. During the government of Juan Velasco Alvarado it was the headquarters of the National Tourism Company of Peru, which at that time was the official agency for tourism in Peru.

Through Law Decree No. 22677, published in the Official Gazette El Peruano on September 11, 1979, it became the site of the Centro Cultural Inca Garcilaso de la Vega where cultural institutions such as the Peruvian Institute of Hispanic Culture and the Hispanic-Peruvian Feminine Circle.

It was restored between 1982 and 1985 respecting its original color, which was indigo blue. It is the venue for cultural events, such as the Lima Photography Biennial, and others related to the life of the city of Lima. It is currently the headquarters of the Peruvian Academy of Language and the regional office in Peru of the Organization of Ibero-American States for Education, Science and Culture.

== Façade ==
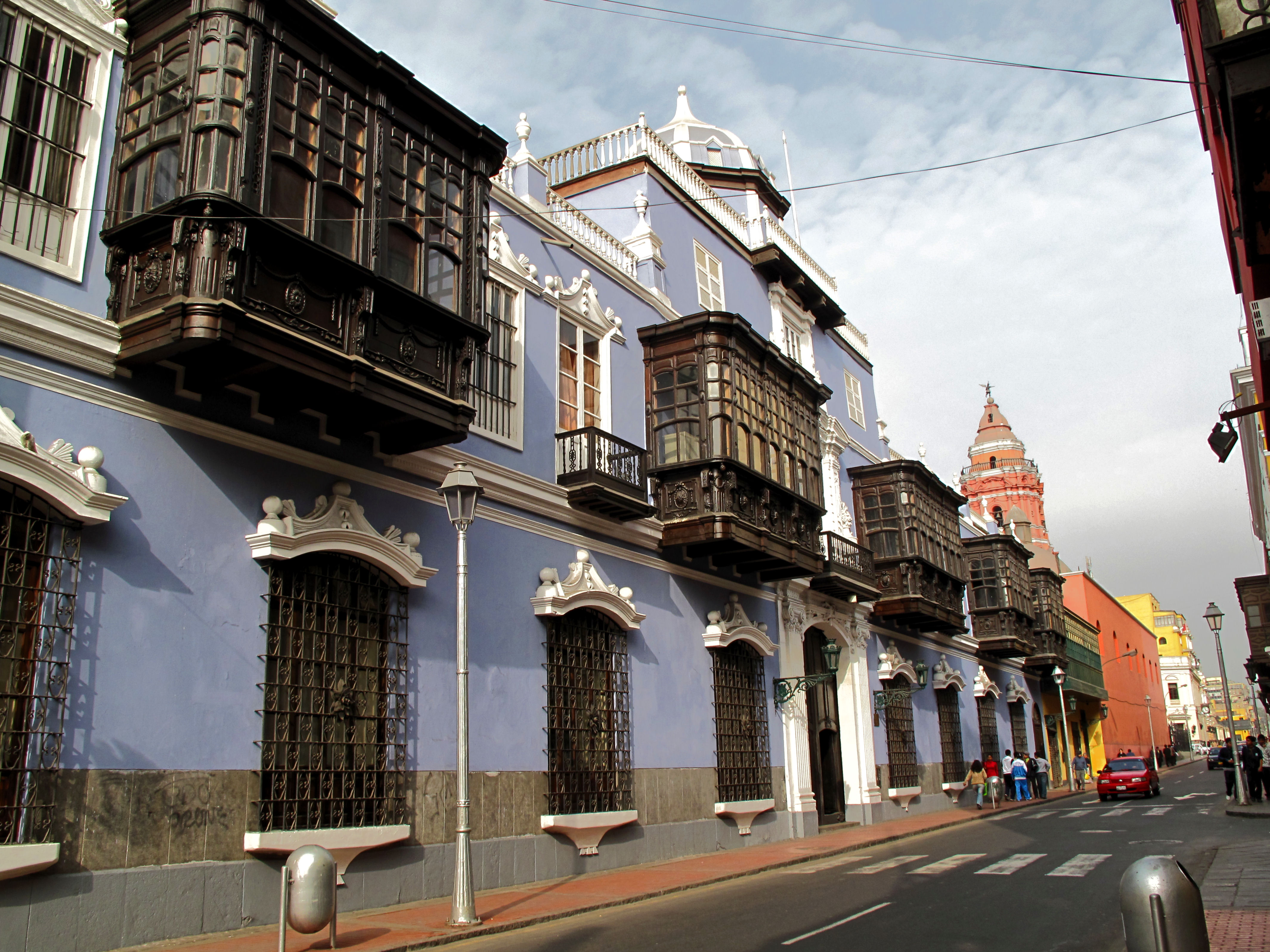
On the façade of the Casa de Osambela it is possible to identify up to three different types of balcony.

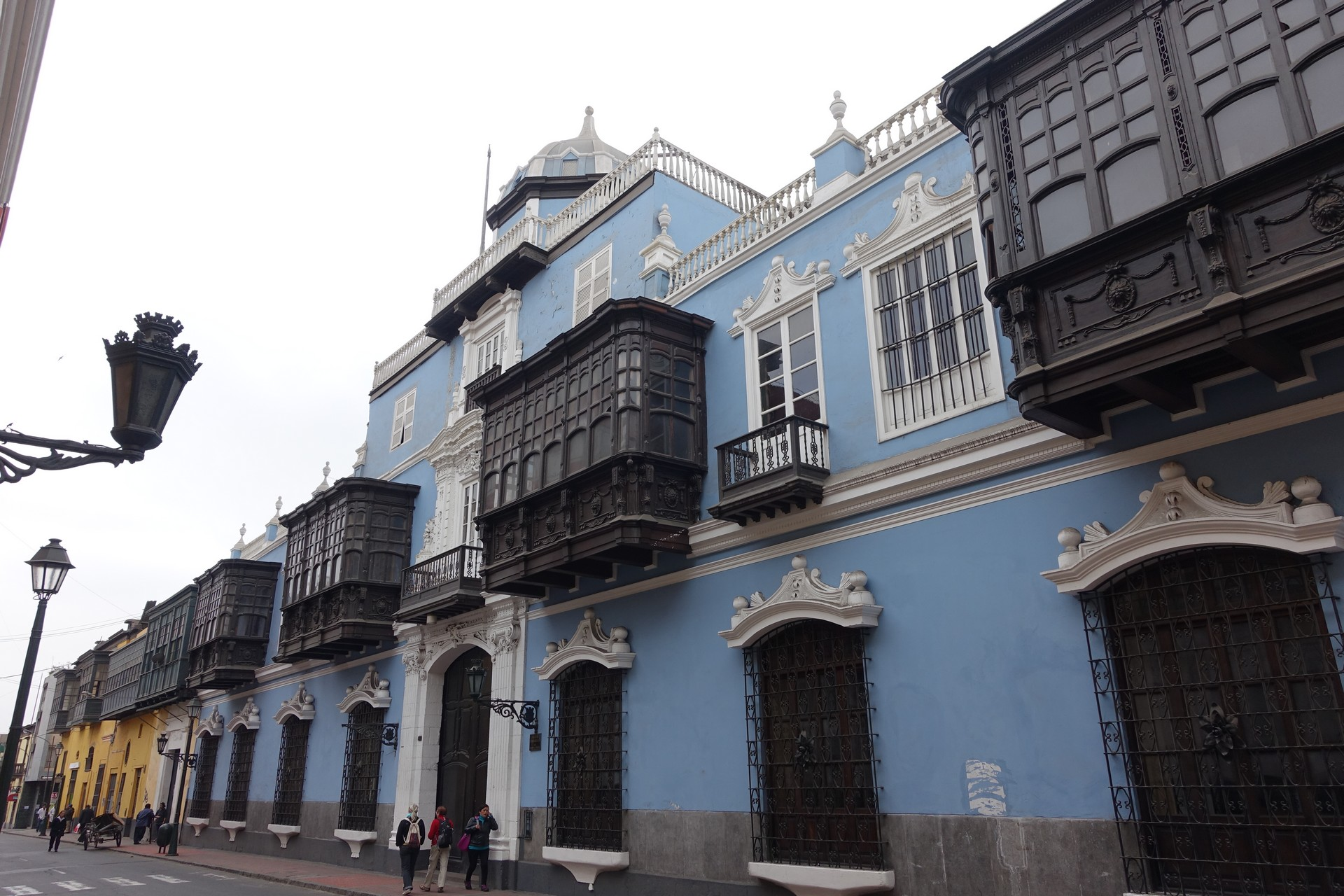
Façade

The façade of the Casa de Osambela is of Neoclassical and Rococo styles. It shows five balconies, in the Louis XVI style, adorned with garlands and accompanied by three parapet balconies. At the top it has a lookout point covered by a small dome with a Mudéjar silhouette. On it the architect Héctor Velarde Bergmann points out:

"Although the house was completed between 1803 and 1805 in its current appearance, its architecture is still perfectly 18th-century and bears much of the finery of Louis XVI and reminiscences of Louis XV; portal with Neoclassical pilasters with Ionic capitals with garlands, typical of the style, lowered arch in a segment of a circle, pear shaped ornaments in the form of cups with flowers, central overlap at the entrance of the three-story openings with vertical plastic continuity and little relief in the French manner. It is notable that this sense of verticality is further accentuated by the lookout point, so Liman, which finishes off and exalts, by contrast and with such eloquence, the wide and rhythmic horizontality of the façade. From that minaret, covered by a small dome with a Mudéjar silhouette, it seems that the first owner of the house, the Spanish banker Osambela, was observing the entrance of the galleons to Callao with a long-sight..."

== Interior ==
Its architectural style is a fusion of those that followed up to that time, highlighting the French influence of Rococo in the decoration. The Casa de Osambela draws the attention of scholars for two peculiarities that distinguished it from the rest of the Lima constructions of the time.

In the first place, unlike the majority of colonial houses in Lima, the rooms of the house are distributed parallel to the street, which makes its façade large enough to accommodate five box-and-box balconies. In the same way, the distribution of its courtyards was the other way around, differentiating itself from the rest of the constructions of the colonial era, which ordered its facilities distributed "in depth" and not in the direction of the façade.

Its other peculiarity lies in its four levels of elevation, instead of two, the fourth level is an octagonal lookout point, which was prohibited at the time of its construction, due to anti-seismic precautions. The main courtyard is notable for its sober nobility and the magnificent staircase leading to the second floor. The second courtyard, reached by a narrow passageway, is smaller and looks older, perhaps from the 18th century.

== Gallery ==
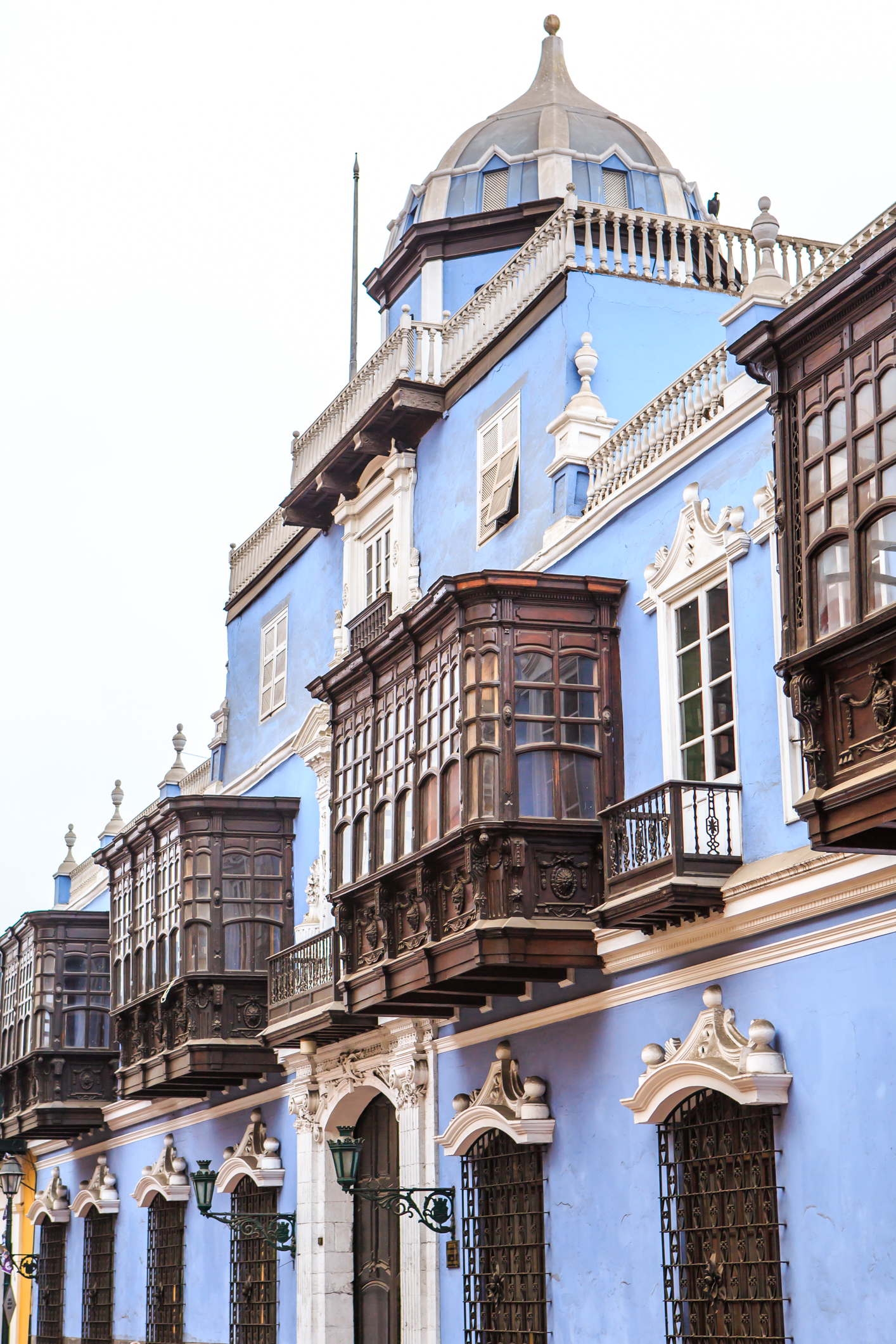
Rococo Casa de Osambela

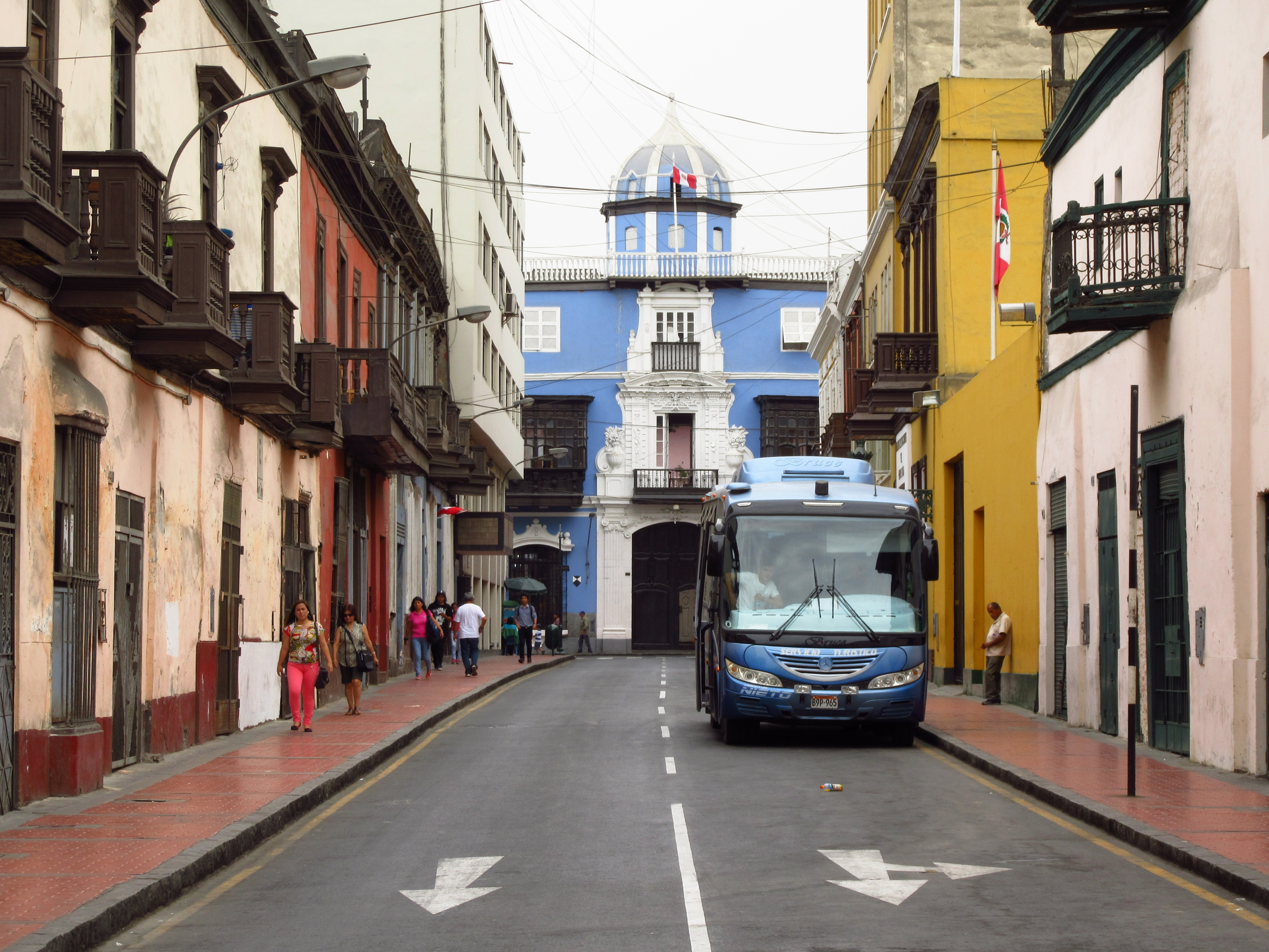
Casa de Osambela from Jirón Cailloma

== See also ==
- Peruvian colonial architecture
- Balconies of Lima

== Bibliography ==
- "La Casa de Oquendo". Colección Documental del Perú, Departament of Lima, Volume XV, Third Edition: 24-25. 1973.
- Acosta Burga, Felipe (1971). «La Casa de Oquendo». Atractivos de Lima. Guía informativa del Departamento de Lima: 37.
- Barrionuevo, Alfonsina (1981). «La Casa de Oquendo». Cartas de Lima (Universo): 148-150.
- Velarde, Héctor (1971). Itinerarios de Lima. Guía de monumentos y sitios históricos.
