= Church of the Good Death =

Church in Lima, Peru

Coordinates: 12°02′50″S 77°01′20″W

Church and Convent of the Good Death
- Iglesia y Convento de la Buena Muerte
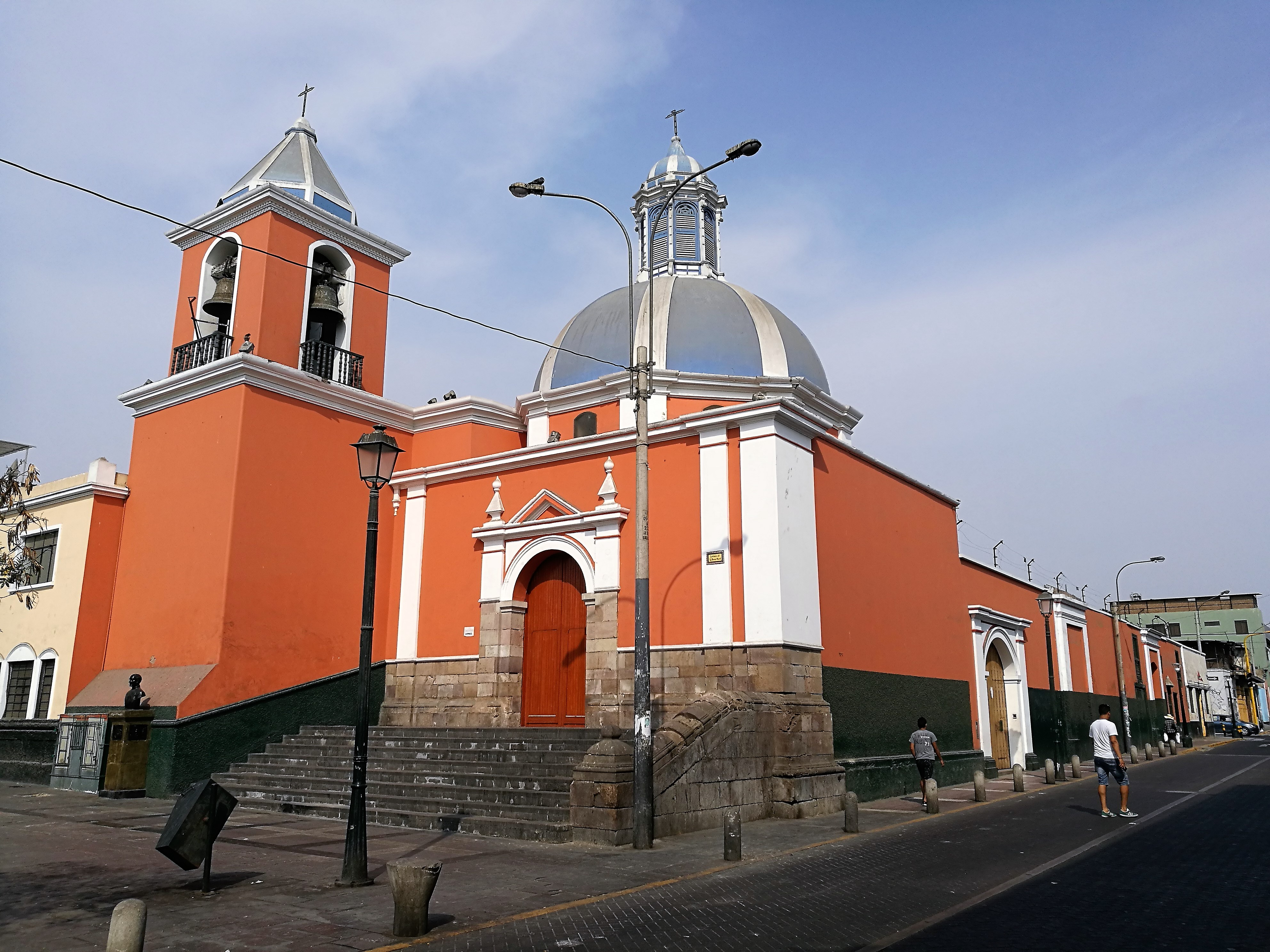
- The church in 2017

Religion
- Affiliation: Catholic
- Governing body: Archdiocese of Lima

Location
- Location: Jirón Áncash 847, Lima
- Interactive map of Church and Convent of the Good Death

Architecture
- Style: Rococo, Neoclassical

The Church and Convent of the Good Death (Spanish: Iglesia y Convento de la Buena Muerte), also known as the Church of Saint Camillus (Spanish: Iglesia San Camilo), after the order's founder, is a Catholic church and convent in the colonial area of the neighbourhood of Barrios Altos in Lima, Peru. The current temple was built at the end of the 19th century and is dedicated to Our Lady of the Good Death. It is located at the crossroads of the Áncash and Paruro streets, and is diagonal to the Trinitarian Church of Lima.

== History ==
The site of the building corresponds to the place where the Order of the Good Death was installed, a hospital organization established in the city in 1709. It had a heritage of 38 urban and rural properties, including 1,500 hectares distributed in different estates a few kilometres away from the capital.

The first convent was completed in 1742, but was devastated by the earthquake of 1746. The current construction was designed by the builder Juan de la Roca and was completed in 1758. Since 1995 it has housed the Centre for Humanization and Pastoral Health and the San Camilo Hospital.

== Overview ==
The first Catholic temple built on the site was a simple chapel dating from the 17th century. The current temple is built in rococo and neoclassical styles. It is elevated a few centimetres above ground level and has stone stairs.

The square between both churches sometimes serves as the atrium of the church. It has a rectangular floor plan with a single nave and no chapels or side niches. Its roof is a barrel vault and above the transept it has a dome crowned by a lantern. The entrance to the building has the peculiarity that it is through a neoclassical doorway on the side of the transept, which also has another exit towards the infirmary's entrance.

The old convent is accessed through an anteport and a porter along the jirón Paruro. This has three patios (the main one, the novitiate and the infirmary) surrounded by galleries with cloisters.

Inside of the church is a statue by Juan Martínez Montañés.

The church has works of religious art, among which the paintings Nuestra Señora de la Buena Muerte y Apoteosis de San Camilo by Cristóbal de Lozano stand out, who also created two paintings inspired by Father Golbordeo Carami, the first member of the order to set foot in Lima.

== See also ==
- Historic Centre of Lima
- Barrios Altos
