= Bodega y Quadra Museum =

Museum in Lima, Peru

Coordinates: 12°02′40″S 77°01′43″W

- Museo de Sitio Bodega y Quadra
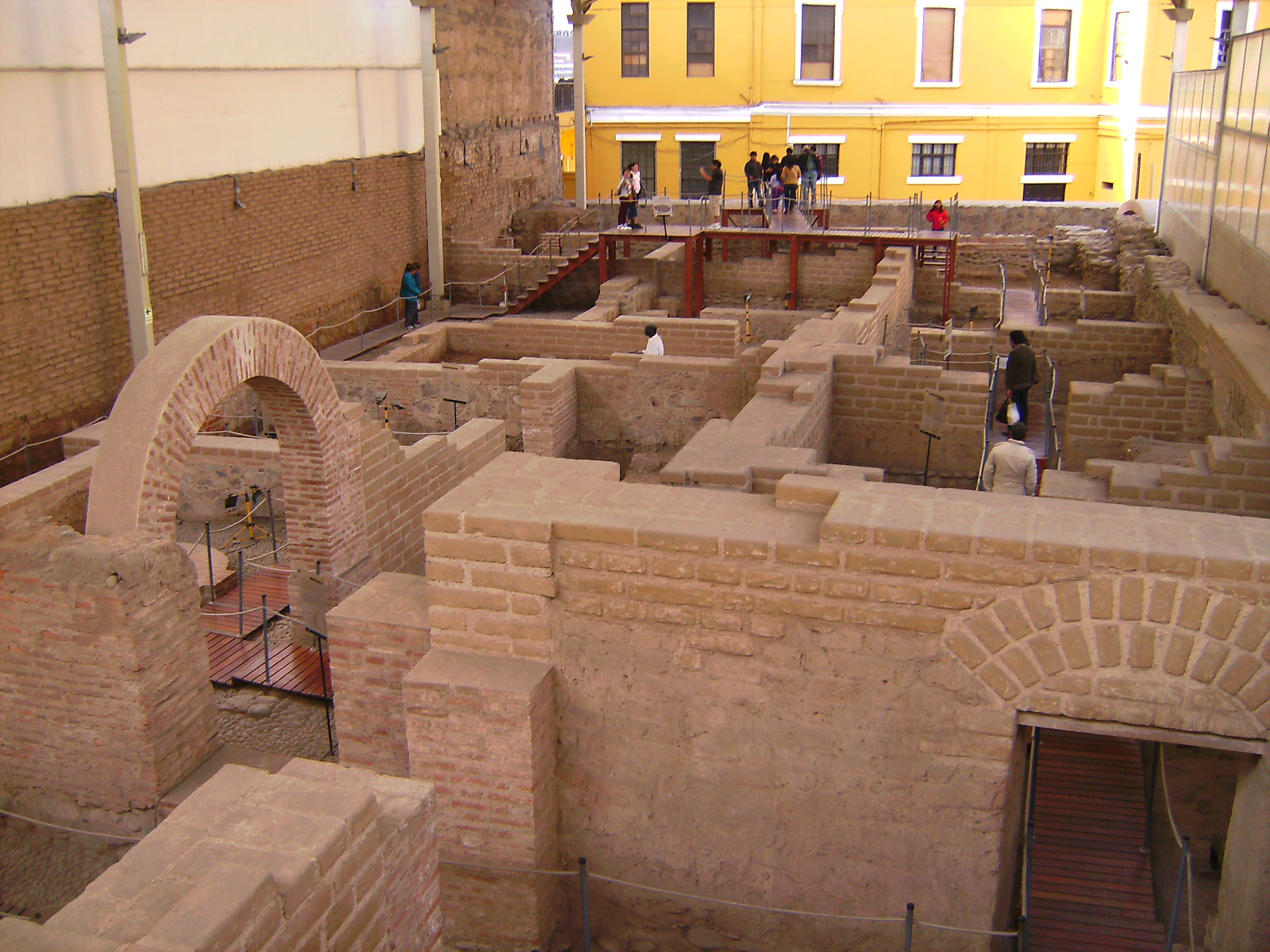
- Location: Jirón Áncash 213
- Type: Site Museum

Bodega y Quadra Museum (Spanish: Museo de Sitio Bodega y Quadra) is a museum located at the second block of Jirón Áncash, in the historic centre of Lima, Peru. Located on the remains of a terrain that dates back to the Viceroyalty of Peru, it illustrates the daily life of people during the Spanish and Republican era of the city.

== History ==
The museum space incorporates an old butcher shop and slaughterhouse from the beginning of the 17th century, whose last owners were the Bodega y Quadra y Mollinedo family. These facilities were discovered during excavations for the construction of a building in 2005. In 2012 the Ministry of Culture promoted the creation of the museum respecting the architecture of the old colonial house and its foundations.

The museum is divided into seven rooms. In one of them, audiovisuals and images of one of the most important members of the owner family, the Peruvian sailor and explorer Juan Francisco de la Bodega y Quadra, are exhibited. In another room, everyday objects found during the excavations, such as Chinese and Panamanian porcelain, as well as candelabras and cutlery, are displayed. In a further room, objects related to wood and leather work have been preserved. There is also a stone wall at the end of the ruins, which was built as a protection wall against the Rimac River.

== See also ==
- Desamparados station, located next to the museum
