= National Afro-Peruvian Museum =

Museum in Lima, Peru

Coordinates: 12°02′49″S 77°01′33″W

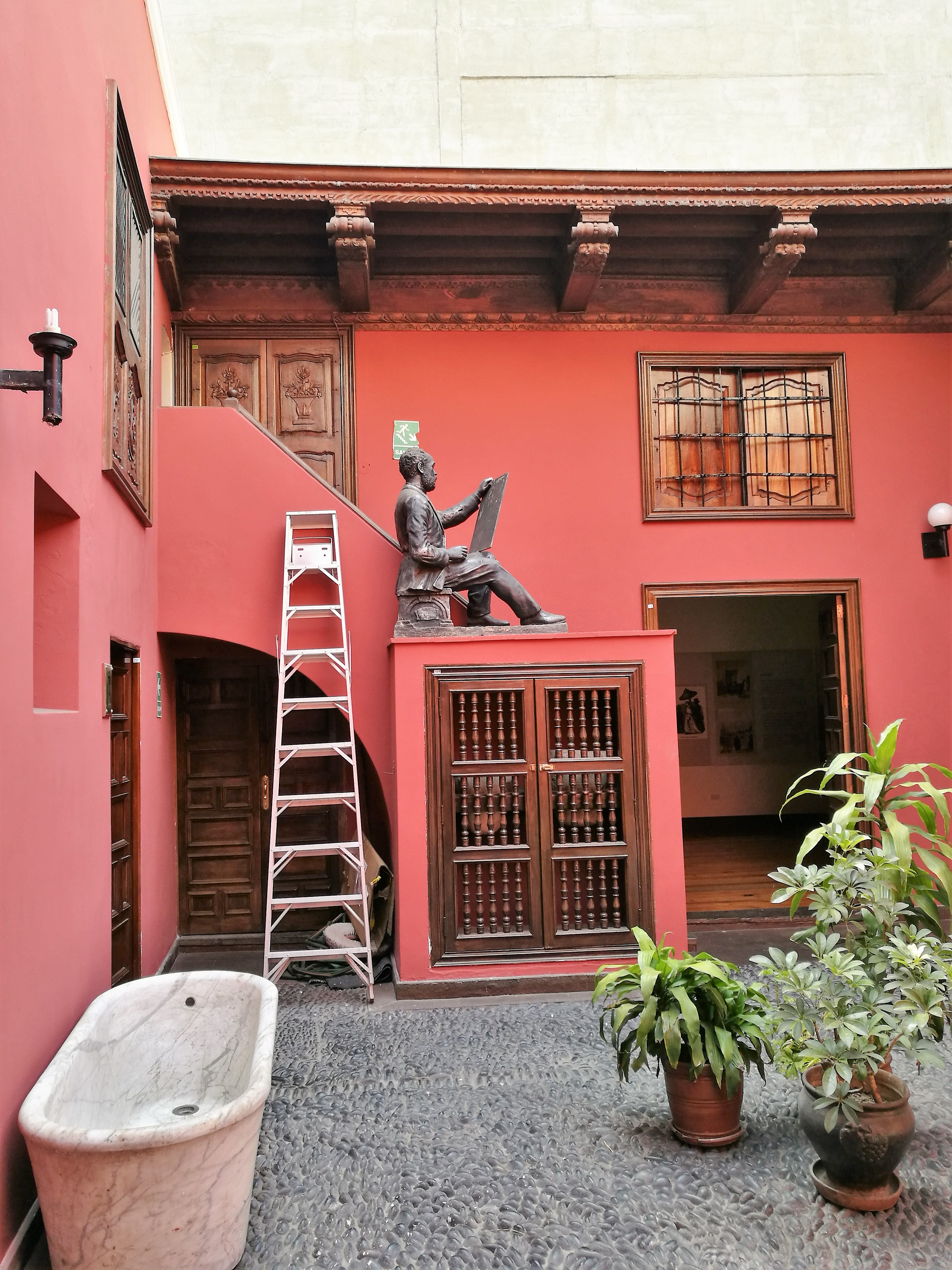
National Afro-Peruvian Museum

The National Afro-Peruvian Museum is a museum dedicated to the acquisition, preservation and exhibition of objects related to the history of African descendants in Peru. Its headquarters is located in the House of the Thirteen Coins located on Ancash Street in the historic centre of Lima. It was inaugurated on 4 June 2009.

The museum has nine permanent exhibition halls, the main exhibits showing the beginnings of trade in African slaves in Latin America, as well as the slave trade in Peru. In the museum, relics are exhibited from colonial times until the beginning of the Republic.

== Related museums ==
Another museum, the Afro-Peruvian Museum of Zaña, was opened in the Saña District of Lambayeque region in 2005. In 2017, it was declared a Slavery Memory and African Cultural Heritage Site by the United Nations Educational, Scientific and Cultural Organization (UNESCO).
