= Trinitarian Church of Lima =

Church in Lima, Peru

Coordinates: 12°02′52″S 77°01′23″W

- Iglesia y Monasterio de las Trinitarias
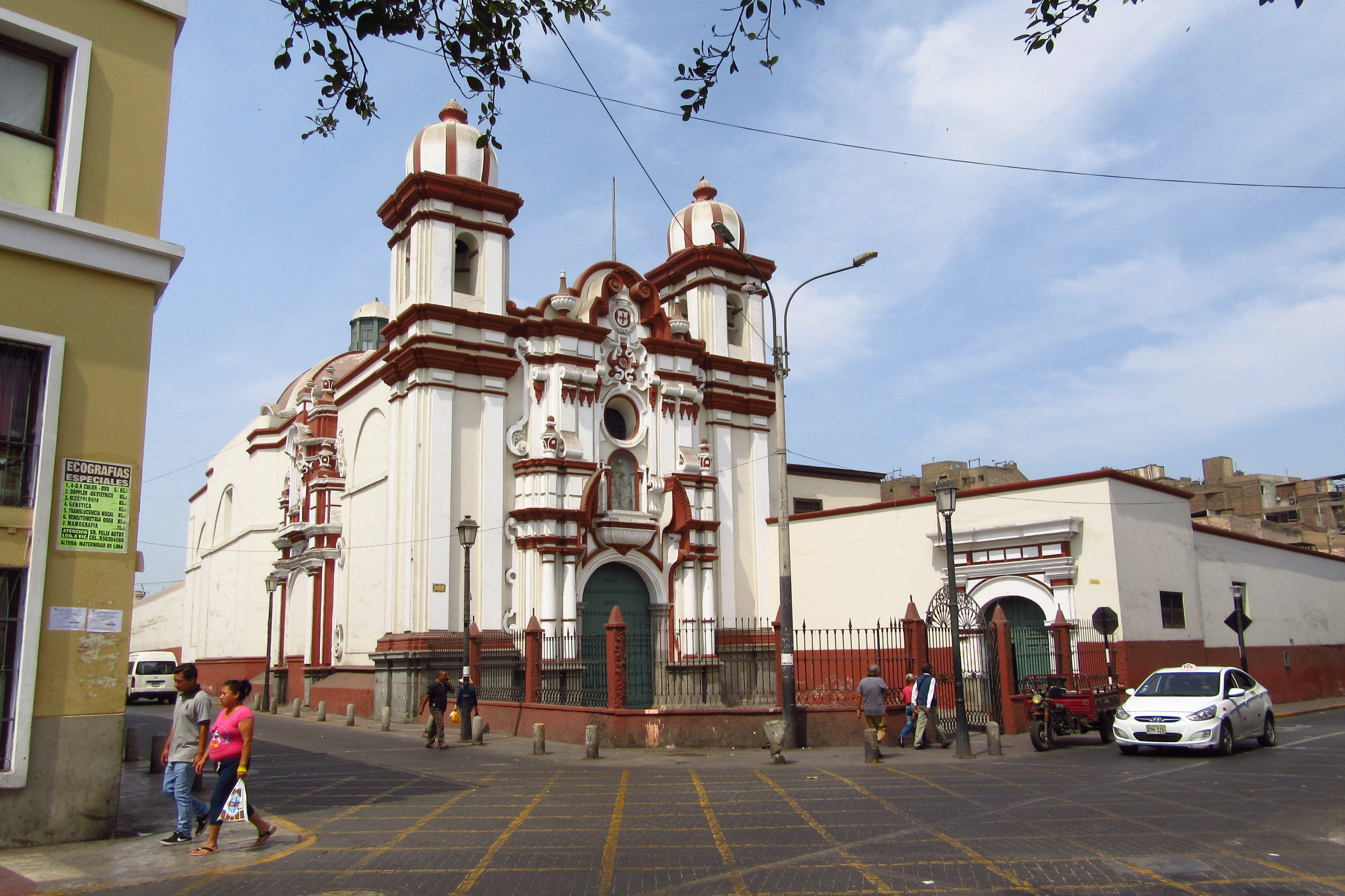
- The church in 2017

Religion
- Affiliation: Catholic
- Governing body: Archdiocese of Lima

Location
- Location: Barrios Altos, Lima
- Interactive map of Trinitarian Church of Lima

Architecture
- Style: Baroque, Neoclassical
- Completed: 1722

The Trinitarian Church of Lima (Spanish: Iglesia y Monasterio de las Trinitarias) is a Catholic church and monastery in the colonial area of the neighbourhood of Barrios Altos in Lima, Peru. Located in the corner of Áncash and Paruro streets, it was built in a baroque and neoclassical style in 1722.

== History ==
Before the church, the land was occupied by the Beaterio de las Trinitarias, which became a convent. The church originated as part of that monastery and was completed in 1722. There are indications that Bernardo de Gurmendi financed the construction of the temple.

On Palm Sundays, a procession with various religious images that the temple houses starts from this church.

== Overview ==
Of baroque and neoclassical styles, the church has a plan in the shape of a Latin cross, without niche chapels and with a transept. Its roof is made up of a barrel vault and a dome over the transept. The imafront is composed of the foot façade and two bell towers, which are tall, slender and symmetrical.

On the pendentives of the dome there are paintings of the four evangelists. The temple also has works such as the Coronation of the Virgin, Saint Joseph, the Virgin of Carmen, the Captive Nazarene Jesus and the Lord of the Reed, an effigy from the 17th century.

== See also ==
- Historic Centre of Lima
- Church of the Good Death, located across the street.
