= Jirón Áncash =

Street in Lima, Peru

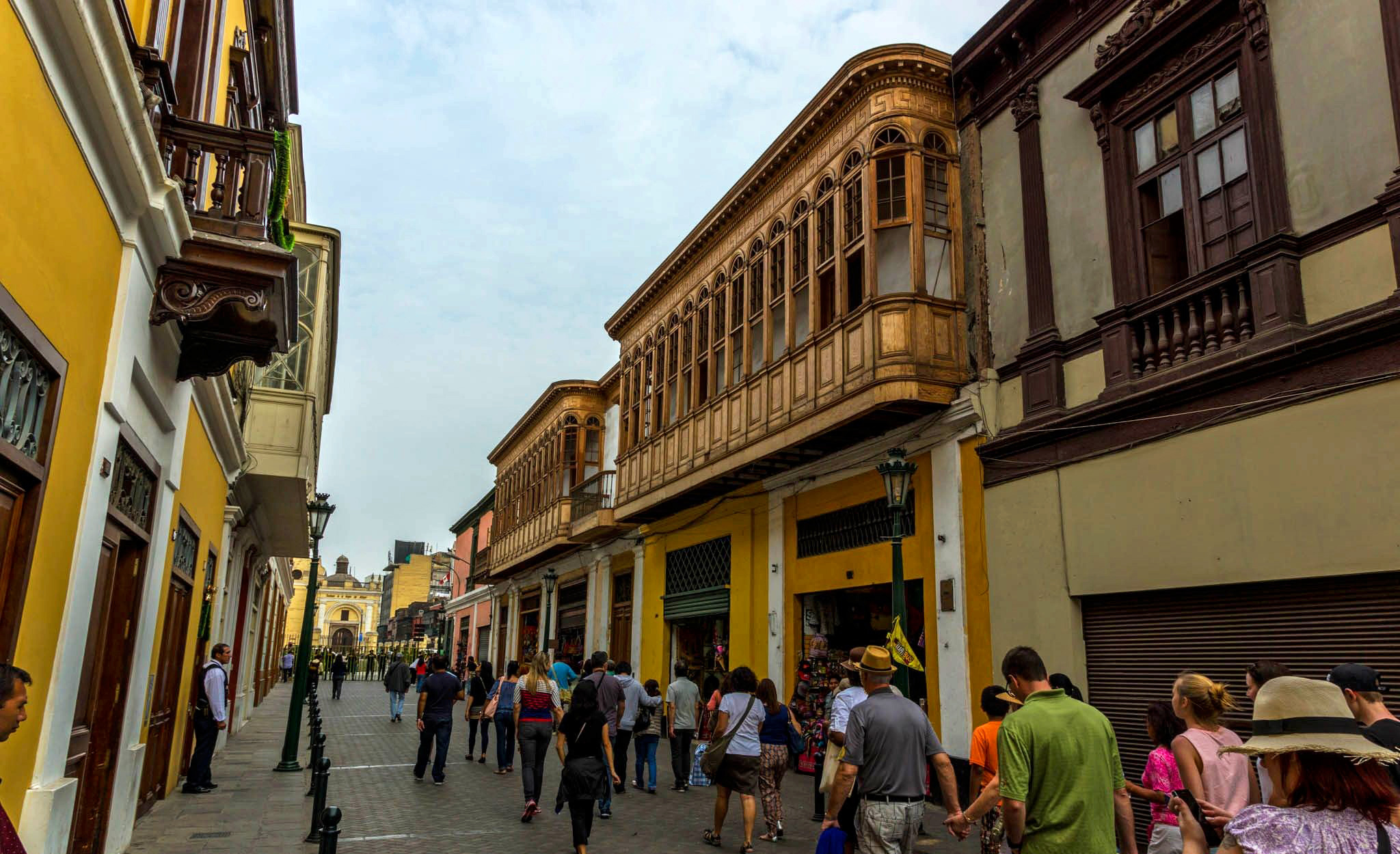
- Second block of the street
- Part of: Damero de Pizarro
- Namesake: Department of Ancash
- From: Jirón de la Unión
- To: Óvalo de la Paz

Construction
- Completion: 1535

Jirón Áncash is a major street in the Damero de Pizarro, located in the historic centre of Lima, Peru. The street starts at its intersection with the Jirón de la Unión at the Puente de Piedra, and continues until it reaches the Óvalo de la Paz.

== History ==
The road that today constitutes the street was laid out by Francisco Pizarro when he founded the city of Lima on January 18, 1535.

The Church of San Francisco was built during the 16th century. During an earthquake in November 1630, an image of the Virgin Mary is said to have turned her face towards the main altar of the church, just at the moment when the seismic movement stopped: several chroniclers have reported this event. The people of Lima, within their Catholicism, interpreted that the mother of Christ turned to see the saint and appease the fury of her son who was causing the earthquake. Given this fact, the Miracle Chapel (Spanish: Capilla del Milagro) was built on the same site it occupies now. Likewise, the Colegio Mayor de San Felipe y San Marcos was founded on that road, which would later be refounded in the Convictorio de San Carlos. The San Ildefonso School was also located in the same block.

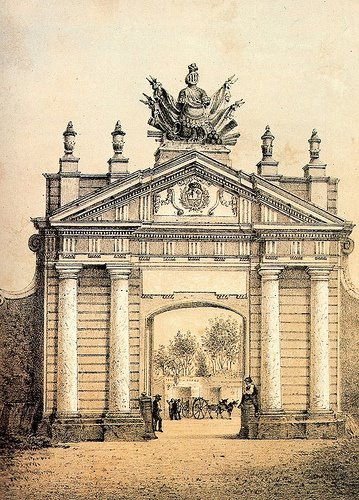
The Portada de Maravillas in 1867.

During the 17th and 18th centuries, several monasteries were founded on this road. In 1808, outside the Gate of Wonders (Spanish: Portada de Maravillas), where this street ended, the Presbítero Maestro Cemetery was built, the first general cemetery in Lima. In 1956, El Ángel Cemetery was built. This led to the sector of Jirón Áncash where both cemeteries are located being called Cemetery Avenue (Spanish: Avenida Cementerio).

The Walls of Lima collapsed in 1868, and with them the gate disappeared.

At the end of the 19th century, the Desamparados station was established as the main railway station of the Central Railway that penetrated towards the Andes to the city of Huancayo.

The street's first block was originally open to the public. A public space known as the Malecón de los Desamparados, named after the church of the same name, demolished in 1937, was closed off in the 1990s due to a series of terrorist attacks that targeted Government Palace during the Internal conflict in Peru.

In 2005, the former facilities of a colonial house were discovered during excavations for the construction of a building. The area is currently the Bodega y Quadra Museum, a site museum that illustrates the daily life of the locals during the Viceregal era.

== Block names ==
Until 1862, each block (cuadra) had a unique name:

- Block 1: Desamparados, after the church of the same name. The Bar Cordano is located here.
- Block 2: Rastro de San Francisco, because the first animal slaughterhouse and the first rastro (place for selling meat) were located there from the founding of the city until 1568, when for health reasons the slaughterhouse was moved to the San Lázaro neighbourhood but not the rastro, which lasted until the end of the 18th century.
- Block 3: San Francisco, after the convent of the same name. It is also the location of the Casa de Pilatos, former residence of the Marquises of San Lorenzo del Vallehumbroso and Colonel Rufino Torrico.
- Block 4: Milagro, after the chapel of the same name. It is also the location of Nicolás de Piérola's house, where he died in 1913, followed by his wife one year later.
- Block 5: Cerca de San Francisco, after the fence that limited the orchard that was part of the Convent of San Francisco. It is also home to the Casa de las Trece Monedas, former residence of the counts of Fuente-Pelayo and current headquarters of the National Afro-Peruvian Museum.
- Block 6: Colegio Real, because the premises of the Colegio Mayor de San Felipe y San Marcos, founded in 1592, were located there. The construction of this school was started by Viceroy Francisco de Toledo and completed by García Hurtado de Mendoza. After the 1767 expulsion of the Jesuits, this school merged with the Convictorio de San Carlos.
- Block 7: Trinitarias, after the Trinitarian Church of Lima, founded in 1722.
- Block 8: Buenamuerte, after the church of the same name, founded in the 17th century.
- Block 9: Santa Clara, after the monastery of the same name, founded in 1606 and where the heart of Turibius of Mogrovejo is buried.
- Block 10: Mercedarias, after the monastery of the same name, founded in 1732.
- Block 11: San Salvador
- Block 12: Refugio, after the hospice of the same name.
- Block 13: Maravillas, after the gate that was part of the walls of Lima, itself named after the church of the same name. This long street had three sections: Refugio, San Salvador and Puerta Falsa del Cercado.

In 1862, when new urban nomenclature was adopted, the road was named jirón Áncash, after the department of Áncash.

== See also ==
- Historic Centre of Lima
