= Church of Our Lady of the Forsaken, Lima =

Church in Lima, Peru

Coordinates: 12.0556°S 77.0515°W

Church of Our Lady of the Forsaken
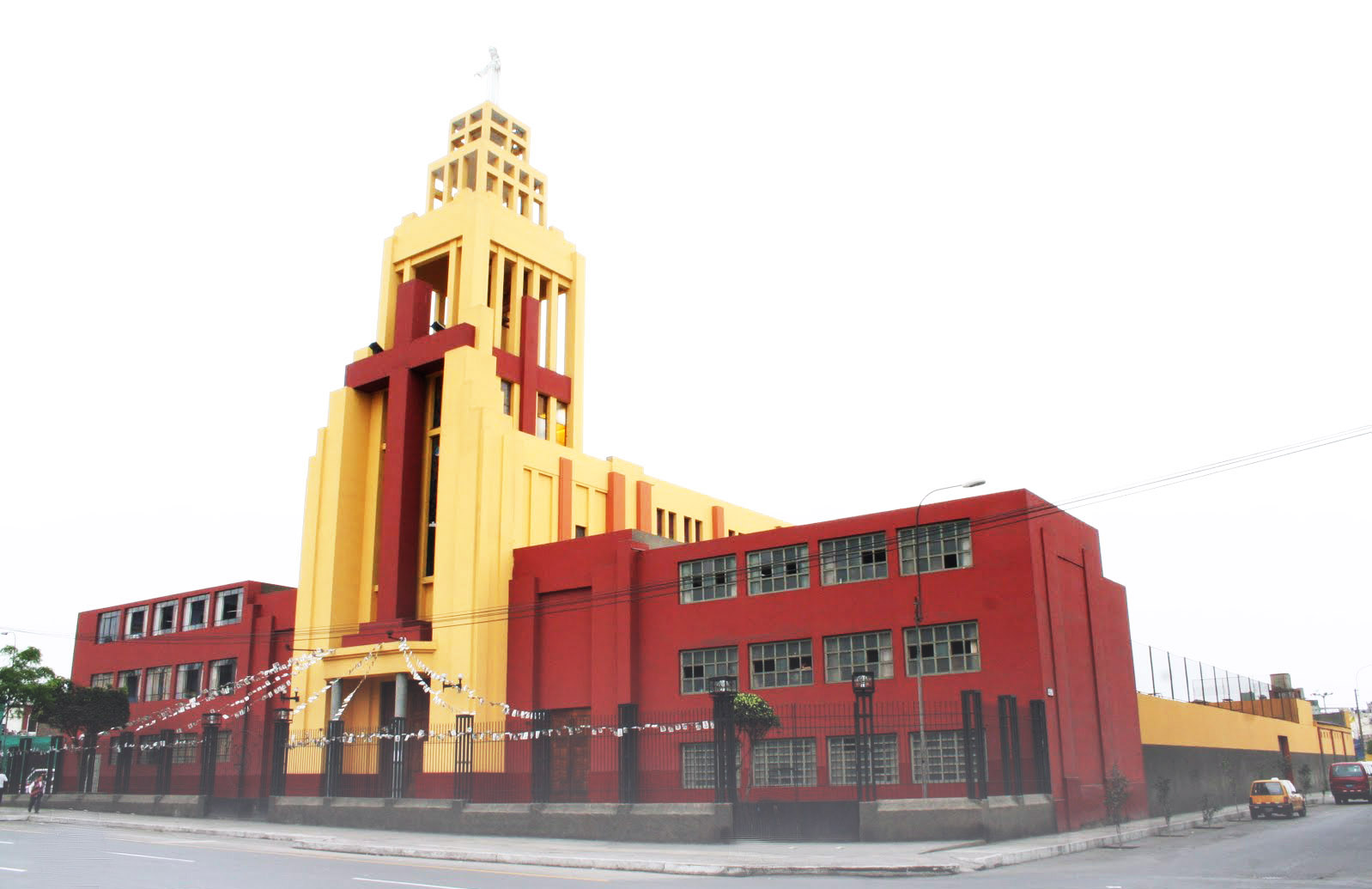
- The church in 2013

Religion
- Affiliation: Catholic Church
- Governing body: Archdiocese of Lima

Location
- Location: Venezuela Avenue 1209
- Interactive map of Church of Our Lady of the Forsaken

Architecture
- Architect: Carlos Morales
- Style: Modernist
- Completed: 1945

The Church of Our Lady of the Forsaken and Saint Joseph (Spanish: Iglesia de Nuestra Señora de los Desamparados y San José), known commonly as the Church of the Forsaken (Spanish: Iglesia de los Desamparados), is a Catholic church located at the 12th block of Venezuela Avenue in Breña, Lima, Peru.

The current building is the successor of the church built between 1669 and 1671, formerly located at the first block of Jirón Áncash. The original building dated back to the Viceroyalty of Peru, having been built by the Jesuits in a baroque style. Following a series of earthquakes, its façade was modified in 1897, with a neoclassical look being chosen instead by the wife of then president Nicolás de Piérola. It was eventually demolished in 1937 to make way for the construction of the posterior garden of the new Government Palace.

== History ==
=== Original building (1671–1937) ===
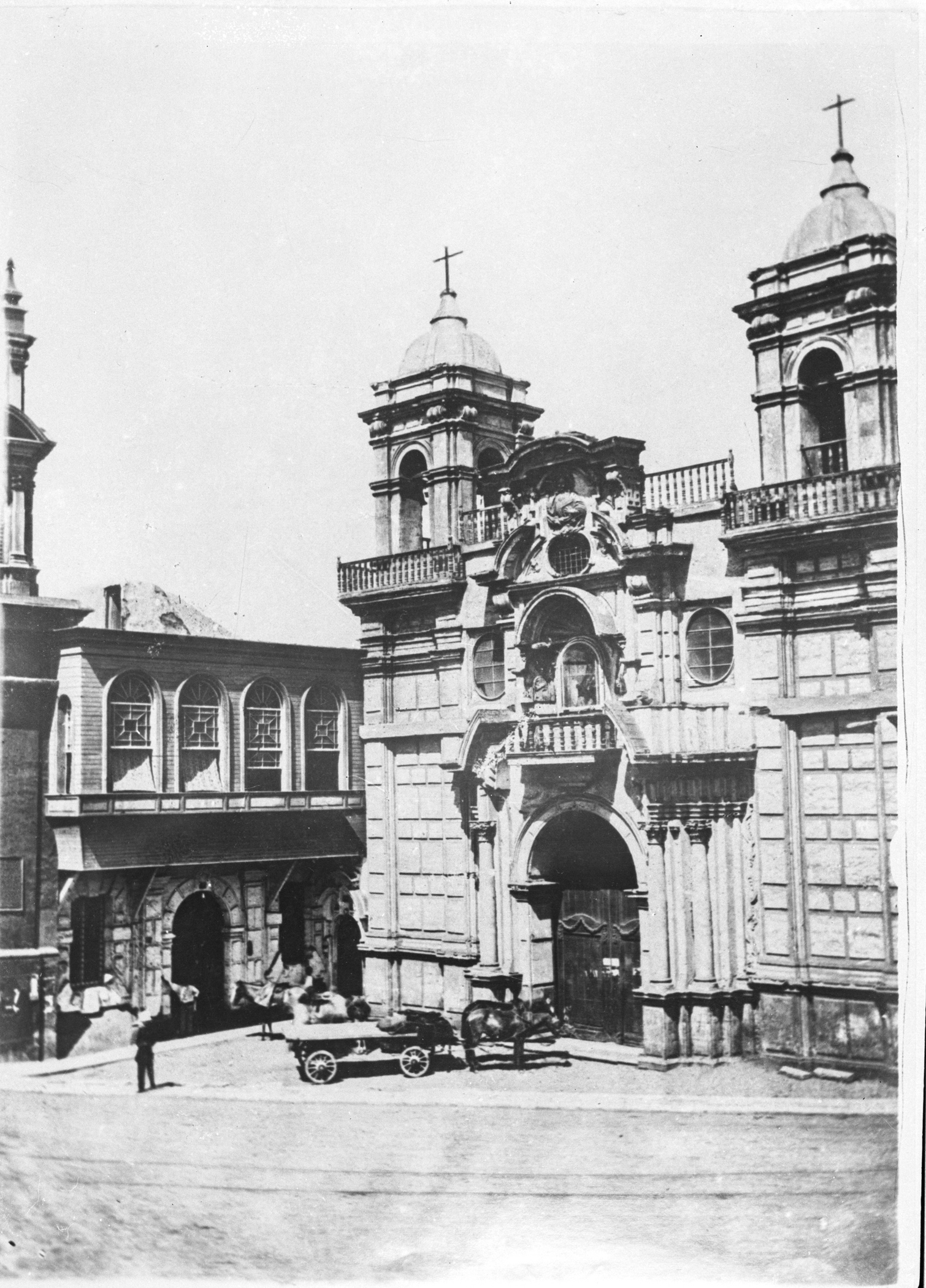
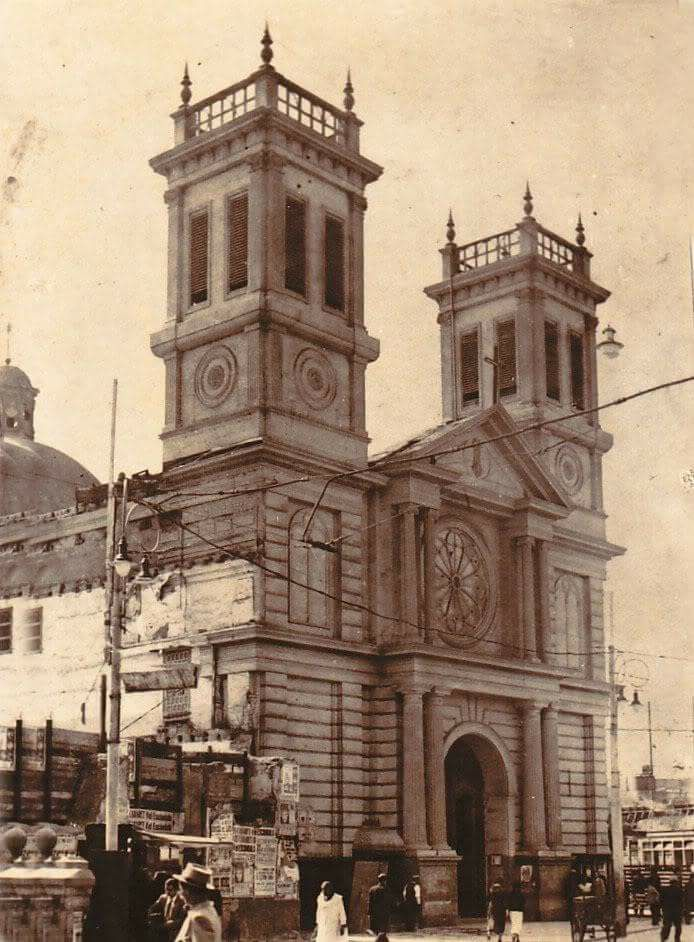
The church in 1875 (left; Courret) and in 1921 (right; IRA).

The original building was located between the Rímac River and the posterior face of Government Palace. Owned by the Jesuits, it was built in the baroque style between 1669 and 1671, under the reign of the Count of Lemos, then Viceroy of Peru. Its first stone was placed in 1669, with its construction being carried out under Manuel de Escobar (Cajatambo; c. 1640 — Lima; 1695), alarife of Lima.

According to writer Antonia Duran, its history dates back to the request for the construction of a chapel dedicated to Our Lady of the Forsaken made by Valencian merchant Bartolomé Calafé to the Cabildo of Lima in the 16th century, which was allowed through the grant of a terrain measured at 25 varas destined to the chapel and sacristy. Years later, Calafé's daughter, Úrsula Morales, requested more terrain, as did the Jesuit Francisco del Castillo afterwards for the construction of a school for destitute children.

According to writer Jorge Bernales, the church was the favourite of the Count of Lemos, who, despite his office of Viceroy of Peru, was commonly seen sweeping the temple's street with a broom as per his humble character, and who requested that his heart be interred in the church upon his death, which was done. After its demolition, it was subsequently moved to the Convent of San Pedro.

In 1894, Jesusa de Itúrbide, wife of president Nicolás de Piérola, decided to modify the church's façade. The works concluded in 1897, with the new façade being in the neoclassical style, and almost no remains of Escobar's work remaining.

The construction project for the new Government Palace made the church's demolition a necessity, an event that took place in 1937. The historical significance of the building led to two opposing views on the project: one in favour, by Eduardo Martín Pastor, and another against it, by Rubén Vargas Ugarte. Many locals opposed the demolition of the building and, despite some reports that it would be spared, what once was the church and its public square of the same name became a promenade known as the Malecón de los Desamparados, which was eventually closed off to the public during the 1990s due to ongoing terrorist attacks.

Due to the demolition, a new terrain was purchased at the 12th block of Venezuela Avenue, at a neighbourhood known as Chacra Colorada, to house a replacement church. The church's altar was moved to the new chapel of Government Palace, and the church's titular image, was moved alongside other items to the new church building.

=== New building (1945–present) ===
The building that replaced the original temple was designed by architect Carlos Morales Macchiavello and built between 1940 and 1945 in the Modernist style. The relics and items housed at the former church were preserved, being moved to the new building.

In 1947, the church sheltered the Virgin of the Assumption, patron saint of the city of Chacas, for almost a year. This was due to the fact that the sacred image was consumed by a fire on its platform during its patron saint's day in 1946 and had to be transferred to the capital for its restoration, after this, the altar of the temple was suitable for the virgin who came from the Andes to remain at the side of the Virgin of the Forsaken during the masses organised by the Chacasino residents in Lima in the last two months before its departure in August 1947.

== See also ==
- Historic Centre of Lima
