= Architecture of Peru =

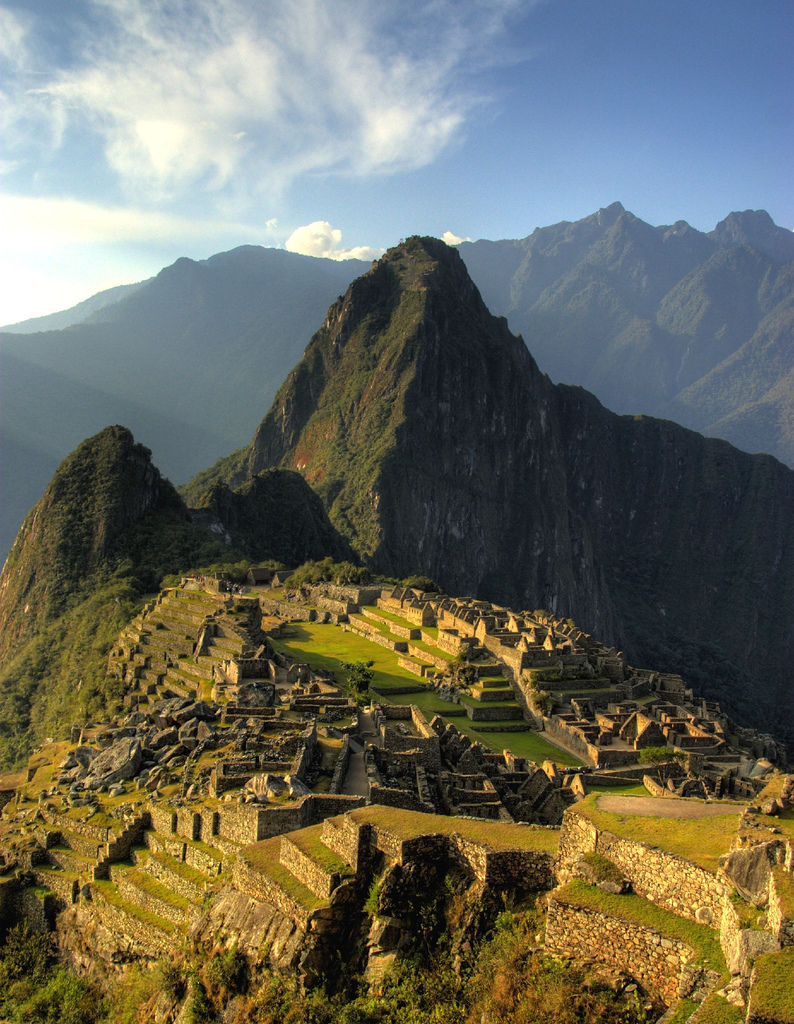
Machu Picchu is a worldwide known example of ancient Peruvian architecture.

Peruvian architecture is the architecture carried out during any time in what is now Peru, and by Peruvian architects worldwide. Its diversity and long history spans from ancient Peru, the Inca Empire, Colonial Peru to the present day.

Peruvian colonial architecture is the conjunction of European styles exposed to the influence of indigenous imagery. Early academia has tended to view the Spanish architectural and religious takeover as complete and swift, but revisionist history emphasizes the lasting role of the indigenous in religious architecture. Two of the most well-known examples of the Renaissance period are the Cathedral of Santo Domingo and the Santa Clara church in Cusco.

After this period, cultural mixture reached richer expression in the Baroque. Some examples of Baroque architecture in Peru are the convent of San Francisco de Lima, the church of the Compañía and the facade of the University of Cuzco and, overall, the churches of San Agustín and Santa Rosa of Arequipa, its more beautiful exponents.

The wars of independence left a creative emptiness that Neoclassicism of French inspiration could just fill. The 20th century is characterized by eclecticism, to which the constructive functionalism has been against. The most considerable example is Plaza San Martín in Lima.

== History of Peru Architecture ==
Peruvian architecture is surrounded by a wide range of elements from many architectures: its origins date back to the structures of the Incas, and later to colonial-era buildings, and Peruvian architects' transformation based on Baroque and Neoclassic European styles.

Fortunately, a series of examples of Incan architecture have staye intact, which was developed until the beginning of the Spanish conquest in 1532.

By the middle of the 20th century, a period of modernization and construction appeared in Lima's historical center in 1988 UNESCO declared Lima's historical center a world heritage site, which inspired many laws designed to protect and care for the city's buildings.

== Archaeological Sites ==
In Peru, the thousand-year-old architectural legacy of some of its many archaeological sites (19,903 to be exact). Here are some of the archaeological sites.

=== Machu Picchu ===
Located in the South of Peru, in the Urubamba Valley. Machu Picchu, Cuzco.

It was built before the fifteenth century on the rocky promontory that connects the Machu Picchu and Huayna Picchu mountains on the eastern slope of the Central Cordillera. It is stone buildings that makeup steps, terraces, and paths of a fortress that is wisely placed in its landscape. Throughout its existence, it has enjoyed a veil of mystery.

=== Pachacámac ===
Located in the South of Lima, in the Lurín Valley.

This archaeological complex was the most important religious-ceremonial center of the central coast of Peru for more than 1500 years, during the pre-Inca and Inca periods.

=== Puruchuco ===
Located on the Northern coast of Lima, in the District of Ate.

The construction of this architectural complex comes from the Inca culture. This monument was the palace of a curaca (ruler) where he lived and administered.

=== Chan Chan ===
Located on the northern coast of Peru, northwest of Trujillo.

It is the largest adobe-built city in the Americas and the second-largest in the world. It is formed by nine citadels (small walled cities). The whole complex was the capital of the Chimor Kingdom and the Chimú culture.

=== Sacsayhuamán ===
Located north of the city of Cuzco.

The large plaza, capable of holding thousands of people, was designed for communal ceremonial activities. Several of the large structures at the site may also have been used during rituals. A similar relationship to that between Cuzco and Sacsayhuamán was replicated by the Inca in their distant colony

=== Pikillaqta ===
Located in the district of Lucre, southeast of the city of Cuzco

Pikillaqta is a village of the Wari people. Wari was the Centre village and other cities like Pikillaqta were influenced by it. The Wari also inhabited many other sites around the area.

=== Nazca Lines ===
Located in the Jumana Pampas, Nazca Desert in Ica.

The Nazca Lines (Líneas de Nazca) are ancient geoglyphs composed of several hundred figures that range from simple designs such as lines to complex zoomorphic, hylomorphic, and geometric figures that appear traced on the earth's surface.

=== Moche Ruins ===
The Moche Civilization flourished from 100 to 800 AD, with its capital in modern-day Moche, Trujillo, and left behind temples such as Huaca de Sol y Luna.

== See also ==
- Incan architecture
- Andean Baroque
- Machu Picchu
- Pachacamac
- Puruchuco
- Chan Chan
- Sacsayhuamán
- Pikillaqta
- Nazca Lines
- Historic centre of Lima
- Historic Centre of Cuzco
- Historic centre of Arequipa
- Historic Centre of Trujillo
- Arquitectonica
