= Desamparados station =

Cultural heritage site in Peru

Estación de Desamparados
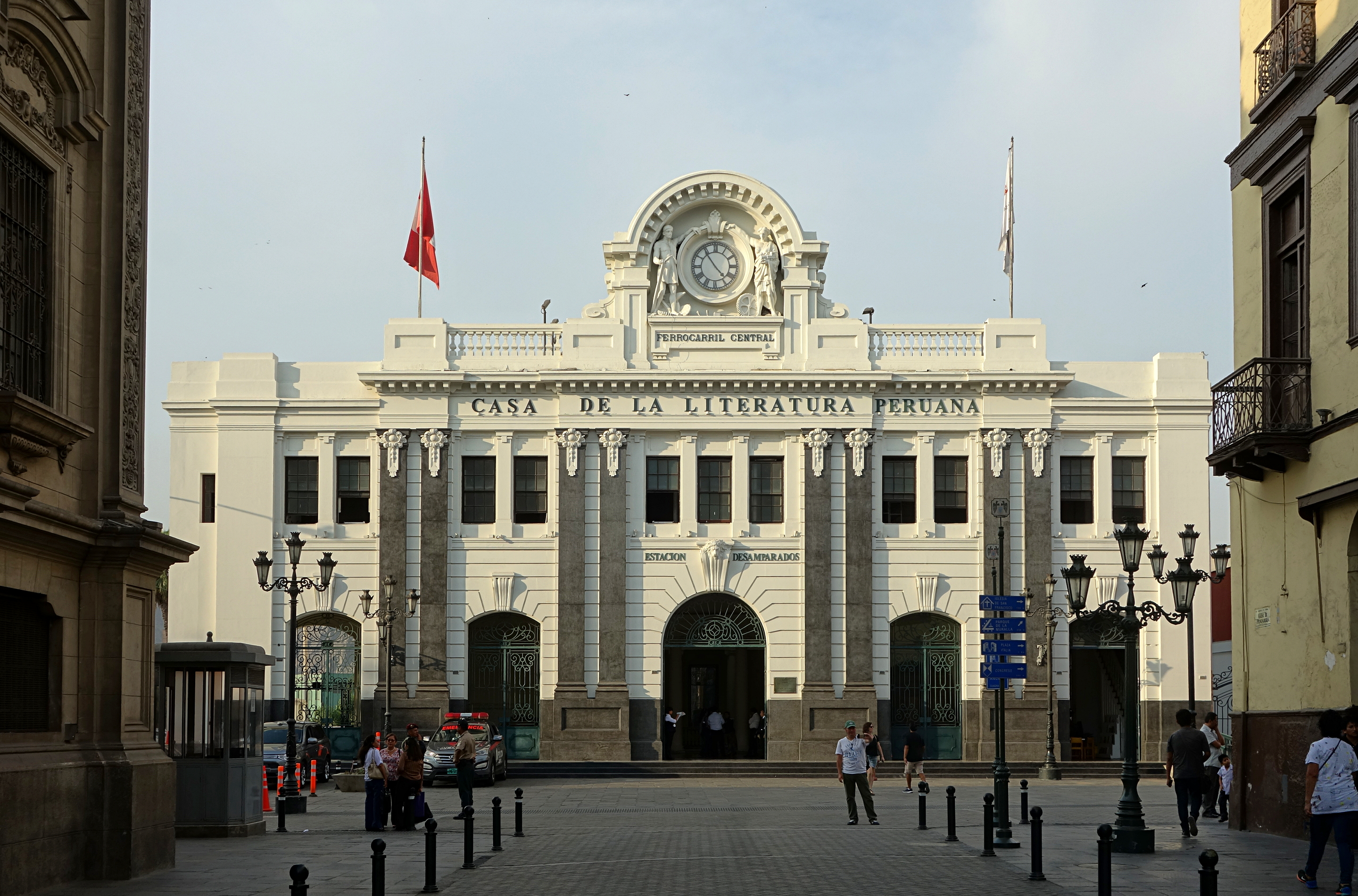
- The station in 2018.

General information
- Location: Jirón Áncash 15001, Lima, Peru
- Coordinates: 12°02′40″S 77°01′43″W
- System: Commuter and Regional rail
- Owner: Government of Peru
- Line: Ferrocarril Central Andino
- Tracks: 1

History
- Opened: 1870
- Rebuilt: 1912
Location

Desamparados station (Spanish: Estación de Desamparados) is a railway station in Lima, Peru. It is situated on the southern margin of the Rímac River, next to the Government Palace, at the intersection of Áncash and Carabaya streets. The station was named after the Church of Our Lady of the Forsaken, which stood next to the station until 1937. The project began in 1890 by the Peruvian Corporation and three years later the Lima–La Oroya route was inaugurated. The line became known as the Ferrocarril Central Andino.

The House of Peruvian Literature (Spanish: Casa de la Literatura Peruana), a museum dedicated to Peruvian literature, was inaugurated in 2009, occupying most of the building. As of 2025, the station only has an administrative use, although it regularly offers passenger services between Lima and Huancayo. It also serves as an exhibition hall, exhibiting such items as the presidential wagon "Paquita", named in honor of the wife of the then President of the Republic Oscar R. Benavides.

== History ==
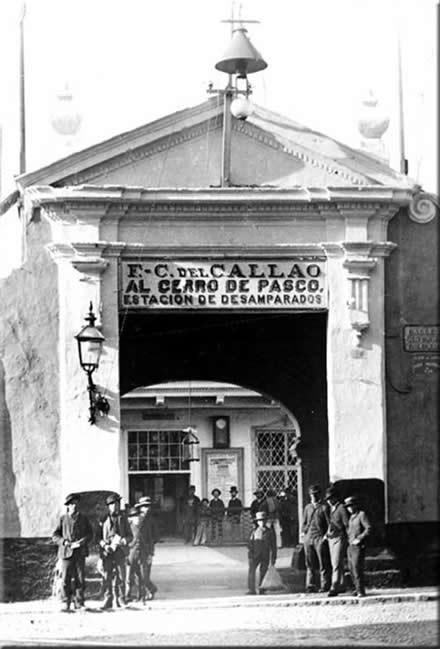
The original station in 1880.

The three-storey building was the first public work conducted by the Peruvian architect Rafael Marquina in 1911, and its construction was finished a year later. In the process of its construction modern materials and techniques were used such as reinforced concrete and expanded metal. One of the main features to the interior is the stained glass skylight, made in the Art Nouveau style. The main facade is symmetrical and consists of five vertical bodies divided by four pilasters of classical design. The facade is designed in Beaux-Arts architecture style.

Under the military government of Juan Velasco Alvarado, the Peruvian Corporation was taken over by ENAFER, a state-owned company. ENAFER continued to operate the service until it was privatised in the 1990s, and the station was handed over to the Ministry of Transport, Communications, Housing and Construction in 1999.

A museum dedicated to Peruvian literature was created by Supreme Decree N° 007-2008-ED, and inaugurated at the station by President Alan García on 20 October 2009. Architect Juan Carlos Burga was commissioned to design the museographic work. The architect David Mutal was in charge of maintaining the validity and sobriety of the station's architecture.

Since 2010, the museum has bestowed an award named after it, first awarded to Mario Vargas Llosa. Among the pieces on display is the presidential wagon "Paquita", ordered to be built in honor of the wife of then-President Óscar R. Benavides.

Having reopened after the COVID-19 pandemic, the station currently operates a bi-annual service of the Ferrocarril Central Andino (FCA) during Holy Week and the National Holidays. In 2025, the announced an additional service, coinciding with the celebrations of the Battle of Junín.

As of July 2025, a project for a railway connecting Lima and Chosica is underway, involving Desamparados, as well as nearby Monserrate station, where a number of trains donated by Caltrain have been stored to be used in the future.

In episode 8 "Comfort Food" of US TV series Pushing Daisies (second season), a photograph of the front of the Desamparados station is used as the Papen County Convention Center where the piemaker is competing in the comfort food cook-off.

== See also ==
- Ferrocarril Central Andino

== Citations ==
- Jiménez Campos, Luis; Santiváñez Pimentel, Miguel (2005). Rafael Marquina. Lima: Instituto de Investigación de la Facultad de Arquitectura, Urbanismo y Artes (UNI, Perú) de la Universidad Nacional de Ingeniería. ISBN 9972-794-09-1.
