= Casa de Pilatos (Lima) =

Building in Lima, Peru

Coordinates: 12.0461°S 77.0273°W

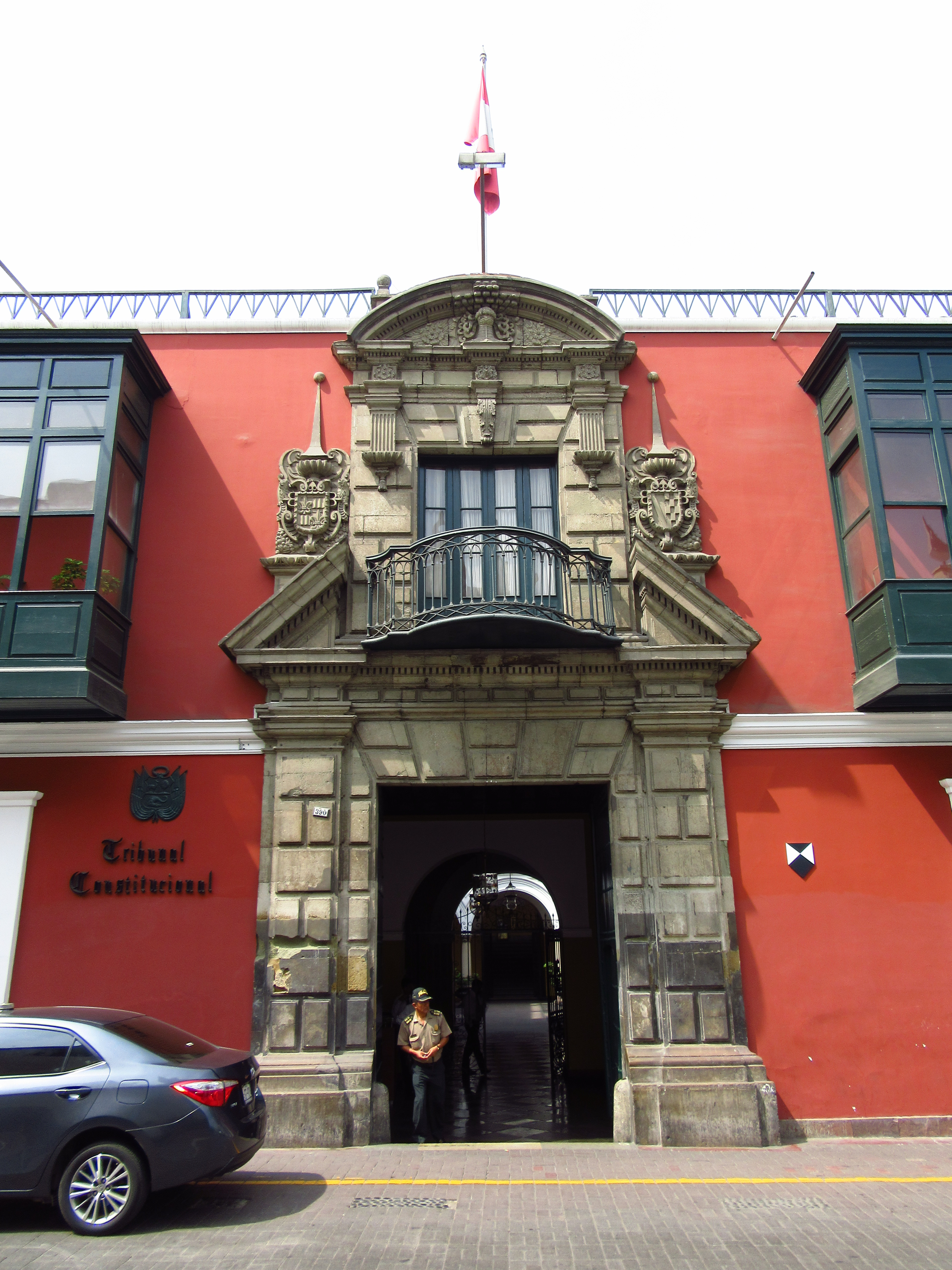
- Interactive map of the Casa de Pilatos area

General information
- Location: Jirón Áncash 390
- Year built: c. 1590
- Owner: Peruvian State

Technical details
- Floor count: 2

The Casa de Pilatos, also known as the Casa Esquivel y Jarava, is a building located in front of the Basilica and Convent of San Francisco in the historic centre of Lima, which currently functions as the de facto headquarters of the Constitutional Court. It was declared Cultural heritage of Peru.

Highlights include its stone doorway, the only one of its kind in the city, the two-section hallway and the imperial staircase, which separates the main patio from the backyard, placed in the central axis of the house.

== History ==
There are two theories about the origin of its name: one refers to its structural similarity to a house of the same name located in Seville, while the other is included by Ricardo Palma in his Peruvian Traditions, where he tells the story of a tenant, a Portuguese Jew called Pilatos by the people of Lima, who was accused by the Court of the Inquisition of carrying out profane ceremonies with sacred images. It was built around 1590; the second floor was rebuilt in the mid-19th century.

The house has been occupied by various families of the aristocracy of Lima, being the home of the Marquises of San Lorenzo del Vallehumbroso who moved to this property in 1780, leaving their mansion in Cuzco. until the Peruvian State bought it during the second government of Manuel Prado Ugarteche.

For a long time, it was the headquarters of the House of Culture of Peru (and its successor) during the military government of Ricardo Pérez Godoy. After the promulgation of the 1993 Constitution, the local headquarters of the Constitutional Court of Peru was installed there in 1996.
