= Casa de las Trece Monedas =

Historic building in Lima, Peru

Coordinates: 12°02′49″S 77°01′33″W

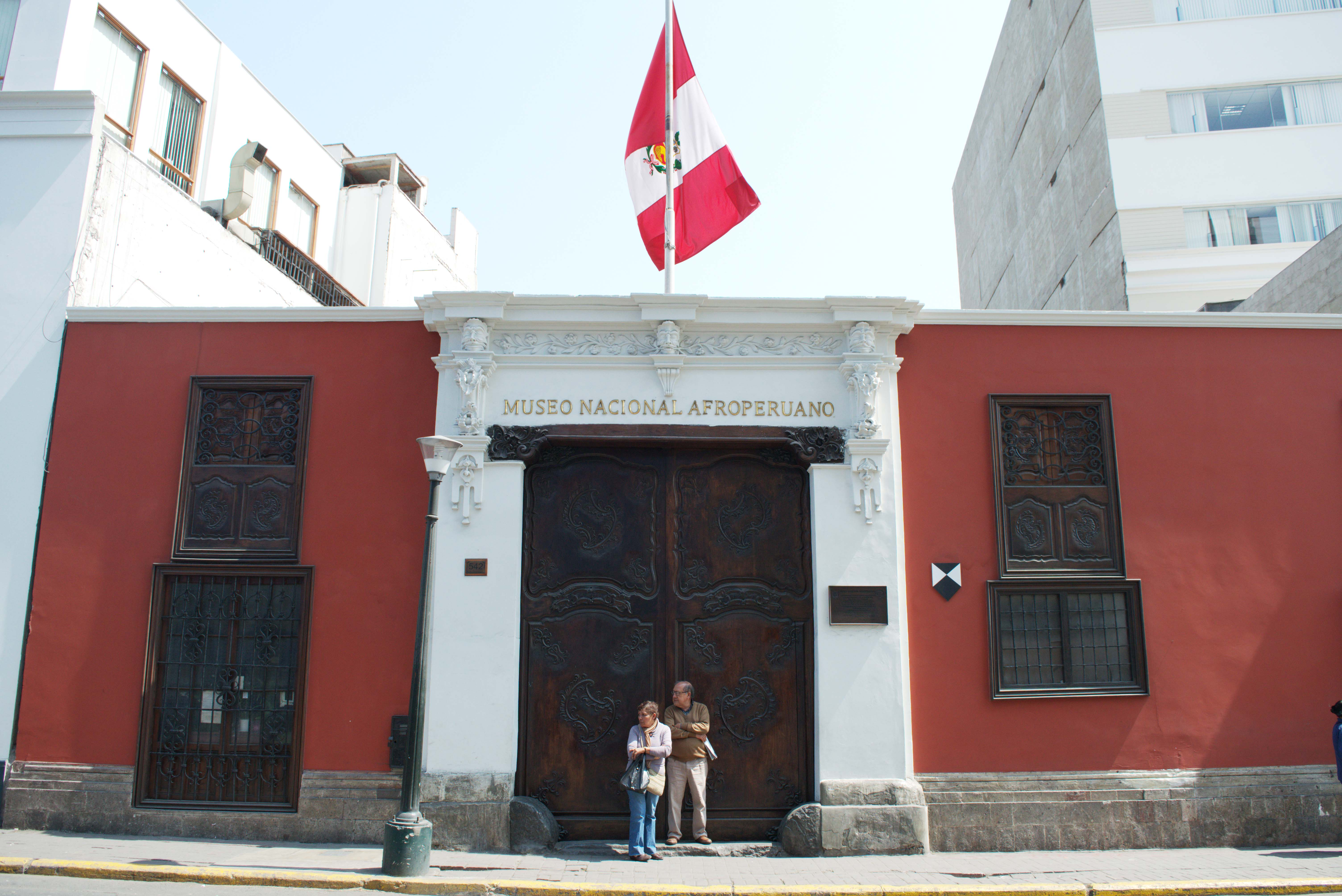
- Interactive map of Casa de las Trece Monedas

General information
- Architectural style: Late Baroque
- Location: Jirón Áncash 536
- Owner: National Afro-Peruvian Museum

The House of the Thirteen Coins (Spanish: Casa de las Trece Monedas) is a historical building in the neighbourhood of Barrios Altos, in the historic centre of Lima, built during the Viceregal era of Peru. Since 2009, it houses the National Afro-Peruvian Museum.

== History ==
Its architectural style is French Rococo, from the second half of the 18th century. It shows a slender doorway, cornices with flower motifs, and small windows with curved panels.

The building belonged to the López-Flores family, Counts of Puente Pelayo. It owes its name to the thirteen coins found in the coat of arms of the owner family. Currently it is the headquarters of the National Afro-Peruvian Museum, but it was also once the headquarters of the Institute of Mathematics and Related Sciences of the National University of Engineering. In 1972 it was declared Cultural heritage of Peru.

== See also ==
- National Afro-Peruvian Museum
- Afro-Peruvians
