= List of hospitals in Peru =

This is a list of hospitals in Peru. There are 1,078 hospitals in Peru. 38% of hospitals are private and the remaining 62% are public. The most important public hospital institutions are the Regional Government, the Social Security System (EsSalud) - see Healthcare in Peru.

== National hospitals ==
=== Ministry of Health System ===
- Hospital Nacional Arzobispo Loayza (HNAL) - Lima
- Hospital Nacional Docente Madre Niño San Bartolomé (HNDMNSB) - Lima
- Hospital Nacional Dos de Mayo (HNDM) - Lima
- Hospital Nacional Hipólito Unanue (HNHU)- Lima
- Hospital Nacional Sergio E. Bernales (HNSEB) - Lima
- Hospital Nacional Daniel Alcides Carrión - Callao
- Instituto Nacional de Salud del Niño - Hospital del Niño (INSN) - Lima
- Instituto Nacional de Salud del Niño de San Borja (INSN-SB) - Lima
- Instituto Nacional de Ciencias Neurológicas (INCN) - Lima
- Instituto Nacional Materno Perinatal (INMP) - Lima
- Instituto Nacional de Oftalmología (INO) - Lima
- Instituto Nacional de Salud Mental Honorio Delgado-Hideyo Noguchi (INSM HD-HN) - Lima
- Instituto Nacional de Rehabilitación y de la Amistad Perú-Japón Adriana Rebaza Flores (INR) - Lima
- Instituto Nacional de Enfermedades Neoplásicas (INEN) - Lima

=== Social Security System (ESSALUD) ===
- Hospital Nacional Guillermo Almenara Irigoyen - Lima
- Hospital Nacional Edgardo Rebagliati Martins - Lima
- Hospital Nacional Alberto Sabogal Sologuren - Callao
- Instituto Nacional Cardiovascular y del Corazón (INCOR) - Lima
- Hospital Nacional Almanzor Aguinaga Asenjo - Chiclayo
- Hospital Nacional Víctor Lazarte Echegaray - Trujillo
- Hospital Nacional Ramiro Prialé - Huancayo
- Hospital Nacional Carlos Alberto Seguín Escobedo - Arequipa
- Hospital Nacional Sureste Adolfo Guevara Velasco - Cusco
- Centros de Atención y Aislamiento Temporal - Villas ESSALUD (For COVID-19 patients) - In a lot of Peruvian cities.
- National Telemedicine Center - Lince, Lima
- National Center of Renal Health - Jesús María, Lima

== Regional hospitals ==
- Hospital Regional Docente de Trujillo
- Hospital Regional de Áncash Eleazar Guzmán Barrón (HEGB) - Chimbote
- Hospital Regional de Apoyo Victor Ramos Guardia - Huaraz
- Hospital Regional Hermilio Valdizán Medrano - Huánuco
- Hospital Regional Honorio Delgado Espinoza - Arequipa
- Hospital Regional de Ayacucho - Ayacucho
- Hospital Regional Guillermo Díaz de la Vega - Abancay
- Hospital Subregional de Andahuaylas - Andahuaylas
- Hospital Regional de Cusco - Cusco
- Hospital Santa Rosa - Puerto Maldonado
- Hospital Regional de Huacho - Huacho
- Hospital Departamental de Huancavelica (HDH)
- Hospital Regional de Huancavelica - Huancavelica
- Hospital Regional de Puno - Puno
- Hospital Regional Santa Rosa - Piura
- Hospital Regional de Huánuco - Huánuco
- Hospital Regional de Amazonas - Chachapoyas
- Hospital Regional de Cajamarca - Cajamarca
- Hospital Regional de Ica - Ica
- Hospital Regional de Moquegua - Moquegua
- Hospital Regional Hipólito Unanue - Tacna
- Hospital Regional de Tumbes - Tumbes
- Hospital Regional de San Martín - Moyobamba
- Hospital Regional de Tarapoto - Tarapoto
- Hospital Regional de Ucayali - Pucallpa
- Hospital Regional Daniel Alcides Carrión - Cerro de Pasco
- Hospital Regional Docente Daniel Alcides Carrión de Huancayo - Huancayo
- Hospital Regional de Iquitos - Iquitos
- Hospital Regional de Lambayeque - Chiclayo
- Instituto Regional de Enfermedades Neoplásicas del Centro - Jauja
- Instituto Regional de Enfermedades Neoplásicas del Norte - Trujillo
- Instituto Regional de Enfermedades Neoplásicas del Sur - Arequipa
- Instituto Regional de Oftalmología - Trujillo

== Other hospitals ==
- British American Hospital - Lima
- Hospital Central FAP - Lima
- Hospital de Chancay - Chancay
- Hospital de Emergencias José Casimiro Ulloa - Miraflores, Lima
- Hospital de Emergencias Pediátricas (HEP) - La Victoria, Lima
- Hospital de la Fuerza Aérea del Perú - Lima
- Hospital Hermilio Valdizán - Santa Anita
- Hospital General María Auxiliadora (HMA) - San Juan de Miraflores, Lima
- Hospital Militar Central - Lima
- Hospital Cono Norte y Callao Luis Negreiros Vega ESSALUD - Callao
- Hospital Octavio Mongrut ESSALUD - San Miguel, Lima
- Hospital Marino Molina ESSALUD - Comas, Lima
- Hospital Suarez Angamos ESSALUD - Miraflores, Lima
- Hospital Albrecht ESSALUD - Trujillo
- Hospital Carlos Alcantara ESSALUD - La Molina, Lima
- Hospital Villa Panamericana (COVID-19) - Villa Panamericana de Villa El Salvador, Lima
- Hospital Centro Médico Naval Cirujano Santiago Tavara - Bellavista, Callao
- Hospital Nacional PNP Luis N. Sáenz - Jesús María, Lima
- Hospital Antonio Lorena - Cusco
- Hospital Goyeneche - Arequipa
- Hospital Policial Geriátrico San José - Lima
- Hospital Rezola-Cañete - San Vicente
- Hospital San José (HSJ) - Callao
- Hospital Santa Rosa (HSR) - Pueblo Libre, Lima
- Hospital Víctor Larco Herrera - Magdalena del Mar
- Diopsi Suyana - Curahuasi, Apurimac
- Centros de Atención, Aislamiento Temporal y Seguimiento - MINSA (COVID-19) - In a lot of Peruvian cities.

== Sources ==
1. Superintendencia Nacional de Salud, Data on Peruvian hospitals. Retrieved 01/08/14.
2. Global Health Intelligence, Information on Healthcare in emerging markets. Retrieved 12/15/14.
