= Avenida del Ejército =

Avenue in Lima, Peru

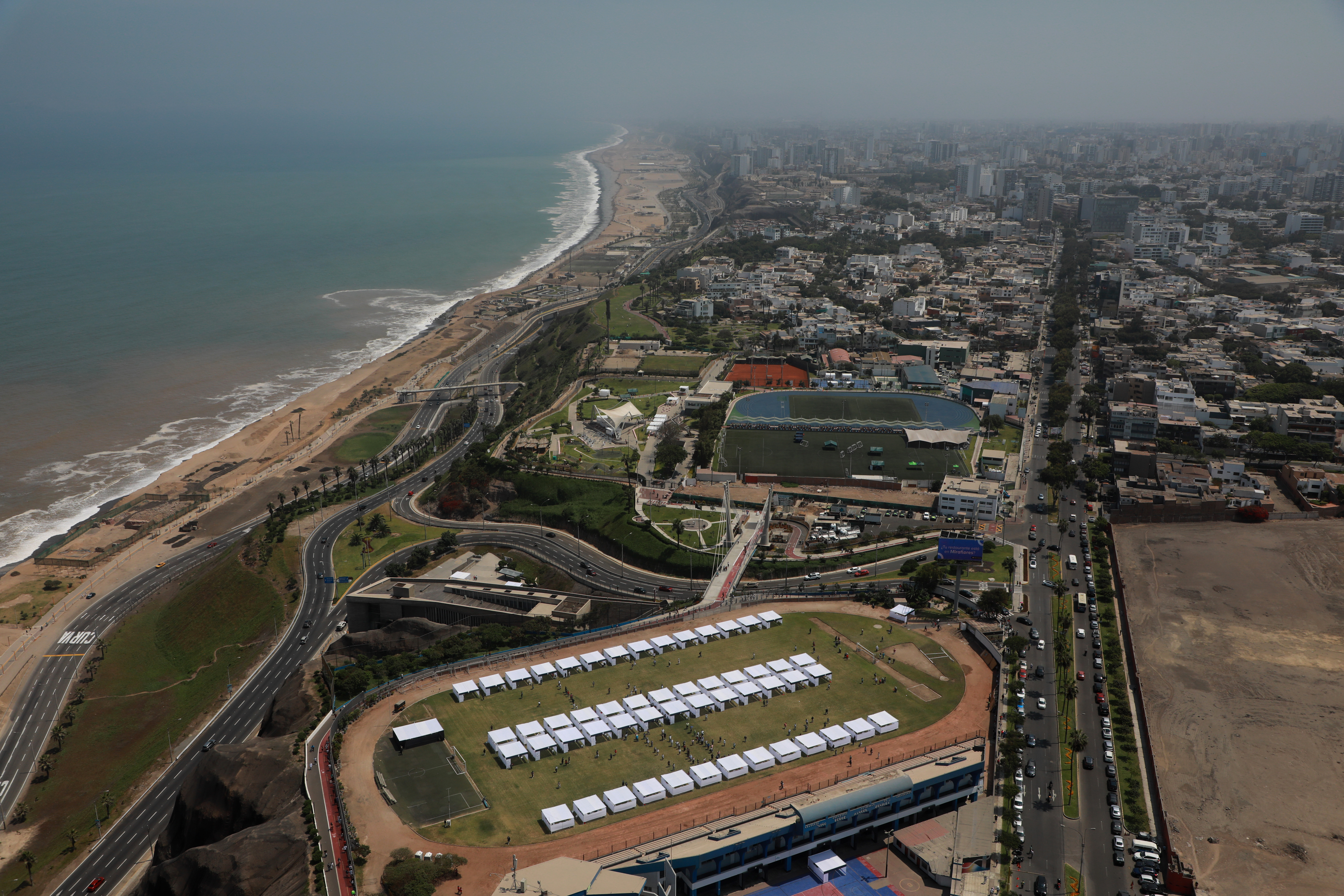
- Aerial view of the sports complex and the former barracks
- Namesake: Peruvian Army; Augusto Pérez Araníbar
- From: Brazil Avenue
- Major junctions: Salaverry Avenue, Colonel Pedro Portillo Avenue
- To: Plaza Centroamérica

Construction
- Completion: 1921

The Avenida del Ejército (Army Avenue), which takes the name of Augusto Pérez Araníbar Avenue (Avenida Augusto Pérez Araníbar) when crossing San Isidro, is an avenue in Lima, Peru. It begins at Brazil Avenue and continues until it reaches the Plaza Centroamérica, crossing the districts of Magdalena del Mar, San Isidro, and Miraflores in the process.

== History ==
The avenue was inaugurated by Augusto B. Leguía in 1921, alongside San Martín barracks, as part of the projects carried out for the Centennial of the Independence of Peru. Named after José de San Martín (and originally after the battle of Junín), the barracks were built to house the Mounted Grenadiers Regiment of the Argentine delegation that was visiting the country in its anniversary, with construction works beginning in 1918. The 68,400 m^{2} barracks were subsequently auctioned due to their "lack of historic value" and demolished. A large part of the terrain was acquired by the GMV-Urbi Consortium.

On October 28, 1995, the Manuel Bonilla Sports Complex was inaugurated, which received a visit by Evo Morales in 2010 and was subsequently remodelled in 2012.

== See also ==
- Centennial of the Independence of Peru
