= Hospital Civil de la Misericordia =

Former hospital in Peru

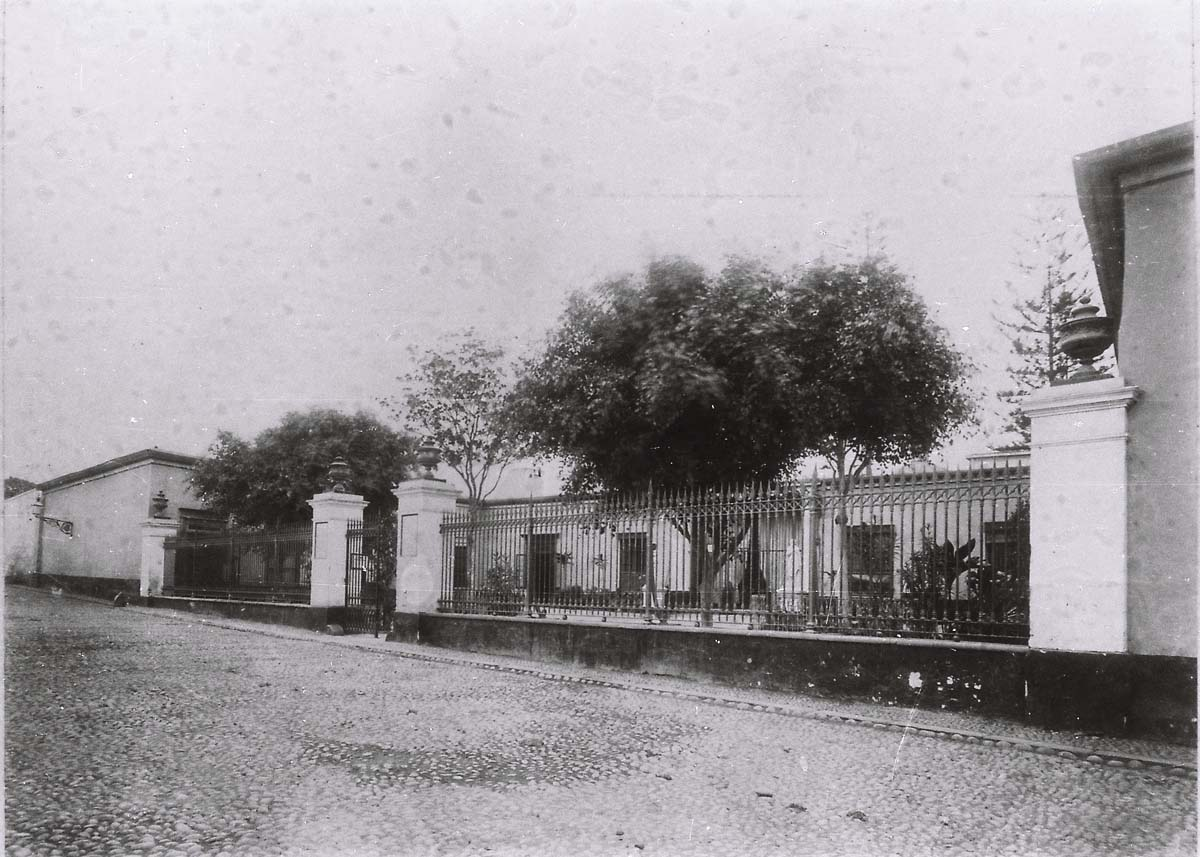
- The hospital c. 1900

Geography
- Location: Av. Sebastián Lorente 769
- Coordinates: 12.050276°S 77.012693°W

History
- Opened: 1859
- Closed: 1918

The Hospital Civil de la Misericordia, also known as the Hospicio de Insanos or Manicomio del Cercado, was a mental institution that operated in the former Quinta Cortés of the neighbourhood of Barrios Altos, in Lima, Peru, between the years 1859 and 1918. A Civil Guard training school was inaugurated on the former hospital's premises after its closure, which is currently used by the National Police of Peru.

== History ==
During the first years of the Republic of Peru, the so-called "loquerías" operated in Lima, the one for men in the Hospital de San Andrés and the one for women in the Hospital de Santa María de la Caridad (located at the Inquisition Square), and from 1840, in the Hospital de Santa Ana; Both hospitals had been founded during the Viceroyalty of Peru, in the 16th century. The poor conditions in which the inmates of the loquerias were found were repeatedly denounced by the doctor Casimiro Ulloa. Thus, in a document written by him in 1859, he states that: “It is impossible to cross the lintel of what are called loquerias without escaping the sight of such a desolate scene. The Santa Ana loquería presents us, of course, with a damp or muddy patio, where one sees here or there piles of stones, and where the unfortunate crazy women, covered in rags and with the particular expression that their evil gives to their countenances, they appear to us like the witches of Macbeth." Such a situation led to the founding of the Hospital de la Misericordia, in the Quinta Cortés, an old premises in the Cercado neighbourhood that had initially belonged to the Jesuits and which had later become a barracks. The inauguration took place on December 16, 1859, and all the inmates were transferred from the old loquerias of San Andrés and Santa Ana.

The new establishment was built under the theoretical framework of moral treatment inspired by Philippe Pinel, in France, although seven decades late. Thus, in its Provisional Regulations of 1897 the following can be read as functions of the Sisters of Charity: "Art. 54. [...] 6. Make every effort to ensure that the sick are constantly clean and treated with affection, without forcing them to engage in religious practices that they do not accept. [...] 9. Prevent the sick from being mistreated in word or deed by the guards or other nurses. [...] 11. The Sisters must rigorously ensure that the sick enjoy all the freedom of action and movement compatible with this Regulation.” As for the guardians, it was among their obligations: “Art. 94. [...] 4. Always use persuasion and gentleness, without insulting or mistreating your patients, in deed or word [...]." The hospice became known for having housed characters such as the Peruvian writers Mercedes Cabello de Carbonera and Jorge Miota, having also been mentioned in some works, such as Una visita al manicomio (A Visit to the Asylum), by the Argentine Juana Manuela Gorriti.

However, with the passage of time, the building of the hospital became insufficient for the growing population that it housed. The doctor Manuel Antonio Muñiz, Ulloa's successor, insistently lamented the overcrowded conditions in which the insane lived, as well as the mistreatment they received, demanding the construction of a larger establishment. In an article published by him he wrote the following: "It can be said, without exaggeration, that the Lima asylum, neither in its beginning nor even with its later improvements, satisfies the multiple scientific demands. And it is even hard to say that it does not deserve the name of a hospital for the insane. The truth must be told in its entirety. [...] The premises are not even appropriate for a house of confinement. That's a long way off. Founding an asylum is a very difficult, very laborious, very delicate job. And all these circumstances were missing from Lima at its foundation. Perhaps there was too much talent to turn a convent into a madhouse. [...] Either you have a good asylum or you do not give that name to a building, to a place that does not deserve it."

Only in 1900 did the construction of a new asylum begin in the town of Magdalena del Mar, the which was not completed until January 1, 1918, when the Colonia de la Magdalena Asylum was inaugurated, where all the patients from the Cercado Asylum were transferred. The premises of the old hospital were used from 1922 as a Civil Guard and Police school, and currently the "Alipio Ponce Vásquez" and "Túpac Amaru" schools of the National Police of Peru operate there. Starting in 1930, the Colonia de la Magdalena Asylum was renamed the "Víctor Larco Herrera" Hospital, a name it retains to this day.

== Gallery ==
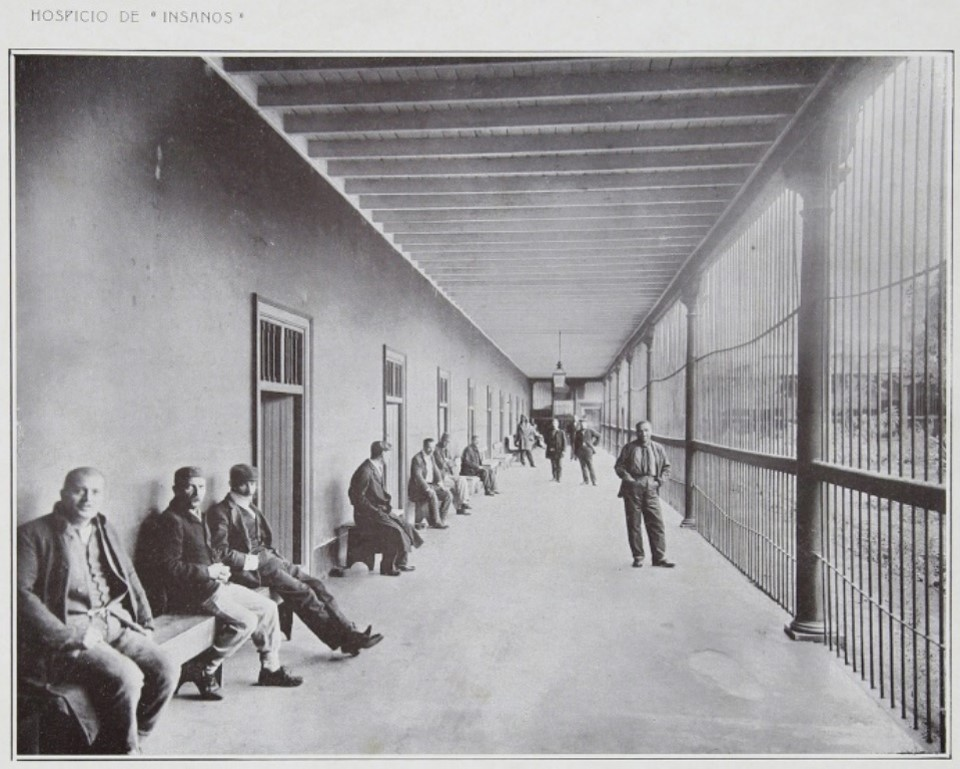
Interior of the hospital

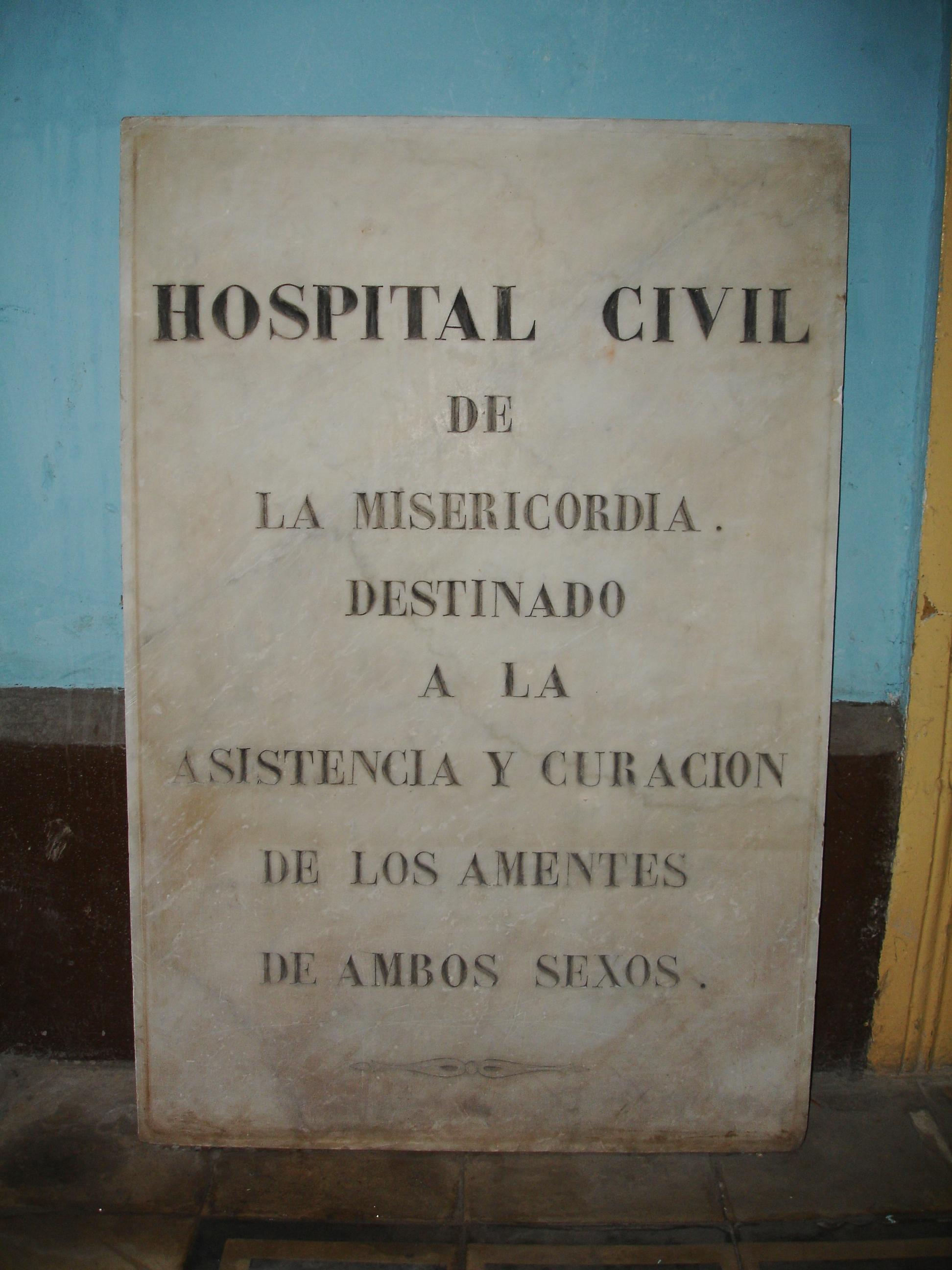
Hospital plaque in the Herrera Hospital

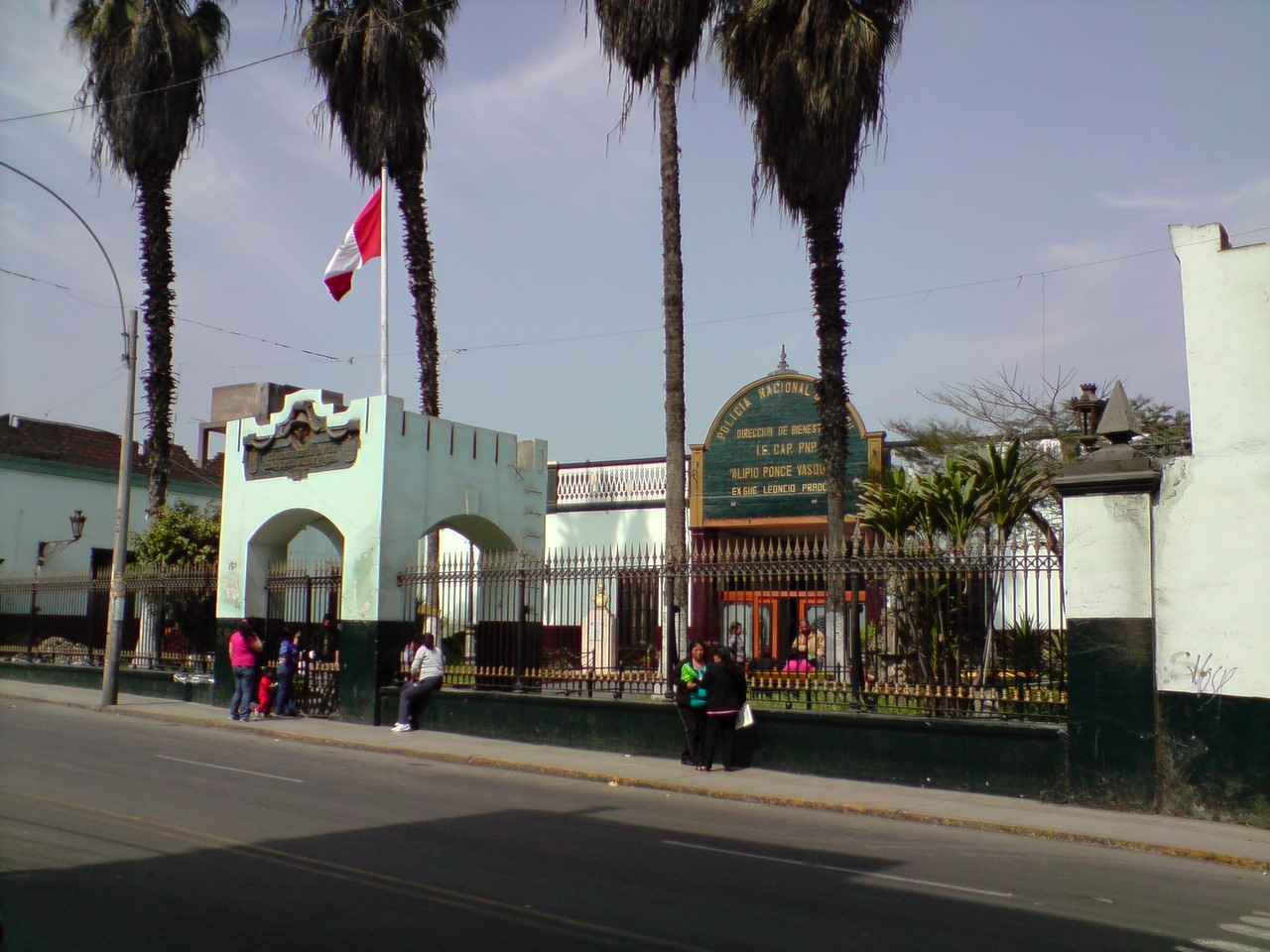
The current police academy

== See also ==
- Royal Hospital of Saint Andrew
