= Monument to the Immaculate Heart of Mary =

Monument in Lima, Peru

Coordinates: 12°05′50″S 77°04′19″W

- Monumento al Inmaculado Corazón de María
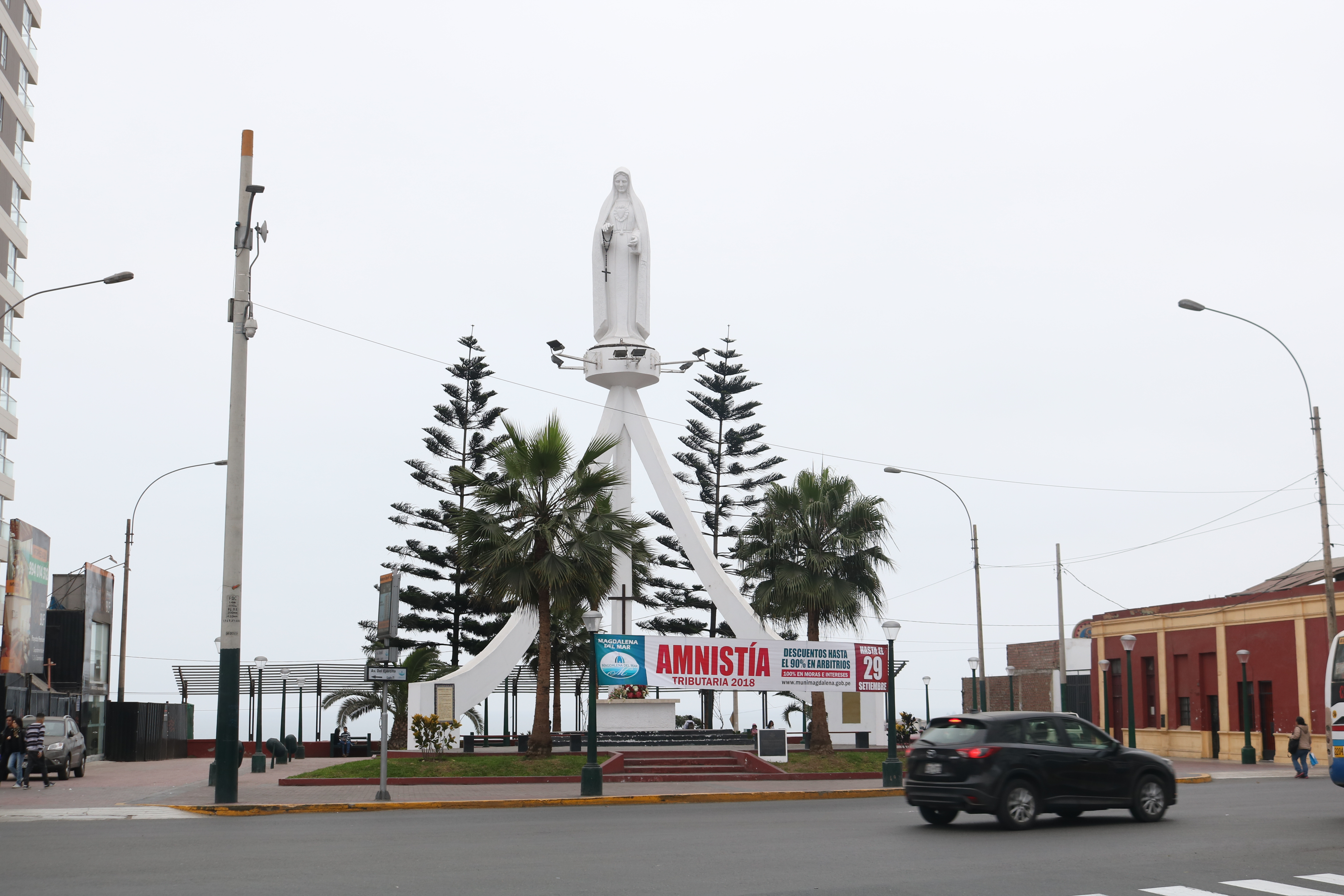
- Location: Magdalena del Mar, Lima
- Completion date: 1956
- Opening date: 1996
- Dedicated to: Immaculate Heart of Mary

The Monument to the Immaculate Heart of Mary (Spanish: Monumento al Inmaculado Corazón de María) is a monument in Magdalena del Mar District, Lima, Peru.

== History ==
The image was completed in 1956 with the purpose of being placed at the top of the Church of the Immaculate Heart of Mary, the tallest in the city. However, due to its excessive weight, four tons, it could not be placed there, due to the risks of damaging the dome of the temple or having it fall due to a seismic movement, so it was saved and preserved for forty years until another place was assigned to it. Through the efforts of the Magdalenian Catholics themselves, who did not want the statue to be moved outside their district, they negotiated with the municipality for the current location, located in the small square that was baptized with the same name to the Immaculate Heart of Mary, and was finally inaugurated in 1996. In front of it has historically been the meeting point for those who parade in the Great Military Parade of Peru, in the years that it takes place on Brazil Avenue, marching towards the Plaza Bolognesi.

On January 18, 2018, during Pope Francis' visit to Peru, in his first stop in the Peruvian capital since his arrival in the country at the base of Air Group No. 8 of the Peruvian Air Force, the pontiff stopped at the square to perform a blessing and a prayer in front of this monument, on the way to the Apostolic Nunciature to Peru.

== See also ==
- Church of the Immaculate Heart of Mary (Lima)
