= Central Military Hospital (Peru) =

Hospital in Lima, Peru

- Peruvian Army
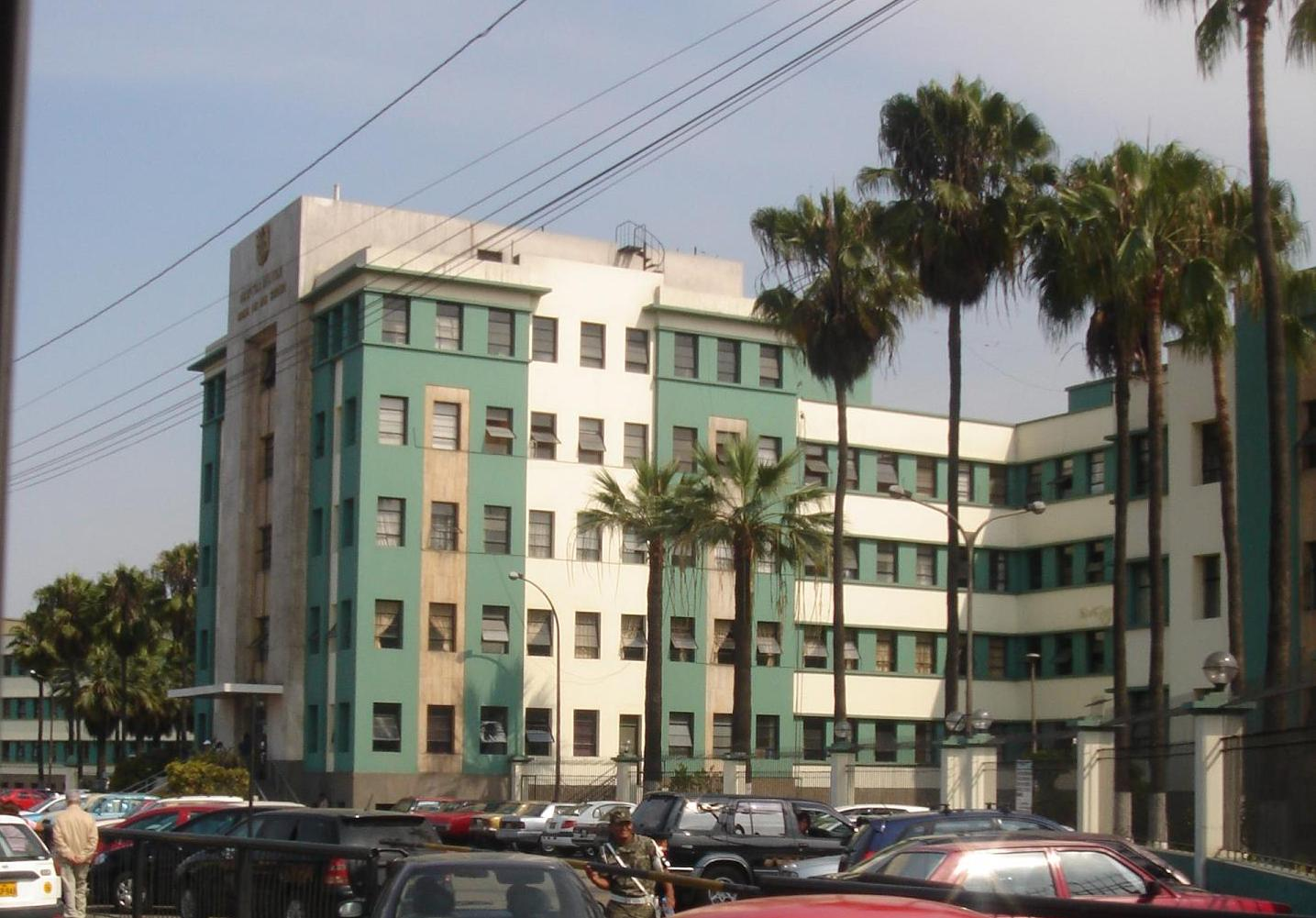
- Main entrance

Geography
- Location: Jesús María, Lima, Peru

Organisation
- Religious affiliation: Catholicism

History
- Opened: December 1, 1958

Links
- Website: hmc.ejercito.mil.pe

The Colonel Luis Arias Schreiber Central Military Hospital (Spanish: Hospital Militar Central; HMC) is a military hospital located in Jesús María District, Lima, Peru. It is located at the intersection of José Faustino Sánchez Carrión (Pershing) and Brazil avenues, serving as the foremost medical institution dedicated to treating members of the country's land army.

== History ==
The hospital has its origins in 1910, when the country's military health service was reorganised, making San Bartolomé National Hospital dependent on the military health service. It subsequently adopted the title of military hospital, functioning as such until a proper hospital was inaugurated.

The new building at Pershing Avenue was established on December 1, 1958. It was built in the Art Deco style. Since 1972, it has been named after colonel Luis Arias Schreiber (1893–1976), who successfully campaigned for its construction. Originally located in Magdalena del Mar District, the area is part of Jesús María since 1963.

A new project was announced in 2019, to be located at the military villa in Chorrillos. In 2025, the closure and demolition of the hospital was announced under a plan headed by ProInversión, although it remains operative as of 2026, performing the country's first meniscus transplant in March.

== See also ==
- List of hospitals in Peru
