= San Martín barracks =

Former barracks in Peru

Coordinates: 12.1086°S 77.0516°W

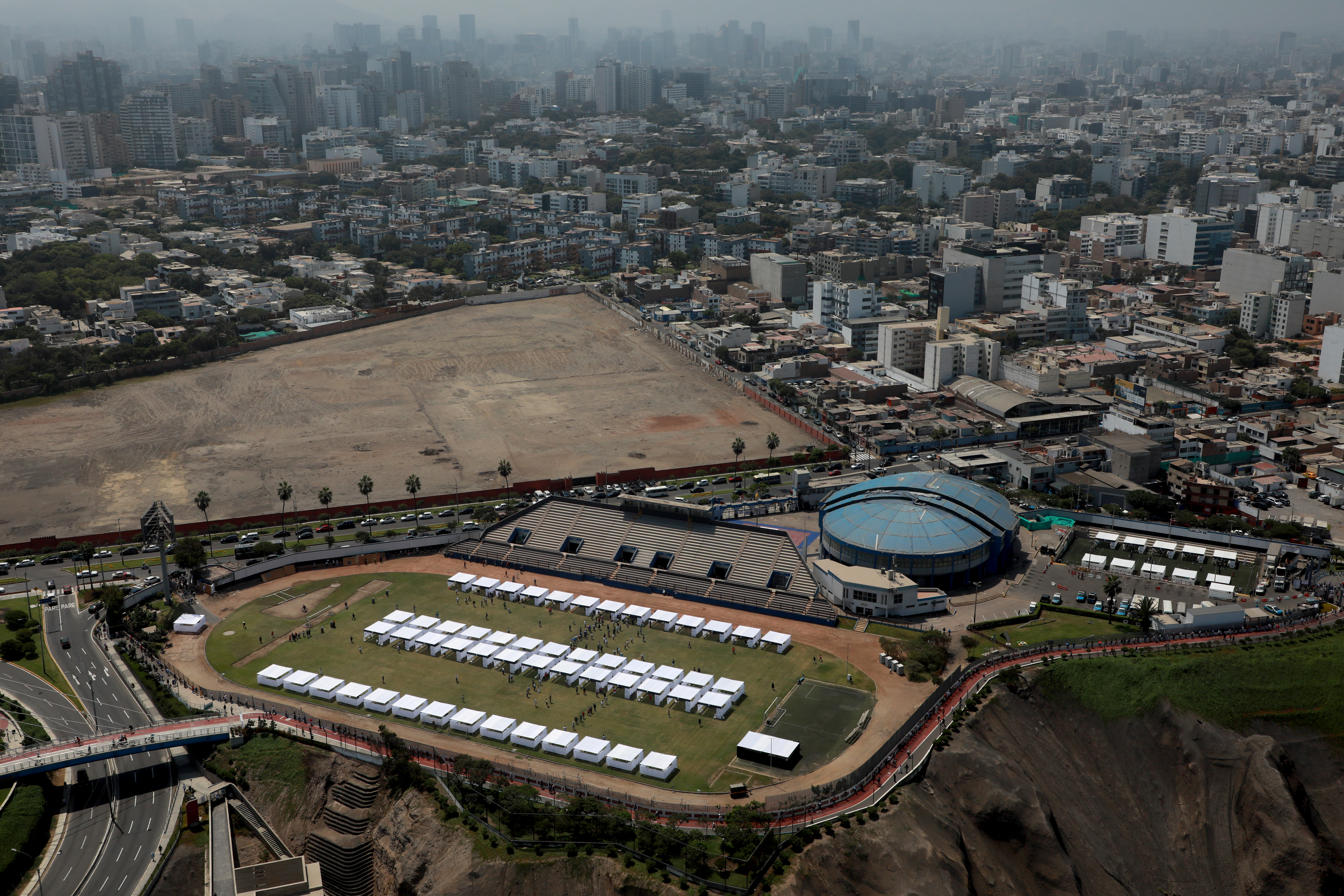
- The former barracks (left) and the adjacent stadium (foreground) in 2021
- Interactive map of the San Martín barracks area

General information
- Location: Av. Ejército s/n
- Year built: 1918–1921
- Inaugurated: 1921
- Closed: 2009
- Demolished: 2010
- Owner: Ministry of Defence

Technical details
- Grounds: 68,400 m^{2}

Design and construction
- Architect: Manuel E. Rodríguez

San Martín barracks (Spanish: Cuartel San Martín), originally Junín barracks (Spanish: Cuartel Junín), was a military installation inaugurated in 1921 to house the Mounted Grenadiers Regiment of the Argentine delegation that visited the country for the Centennial of the Independence of Peru. Located the 13th block of the Avenida del Ejército, it was subsequently closed and auctioned in 2009 and demolished a year later.

== History ==
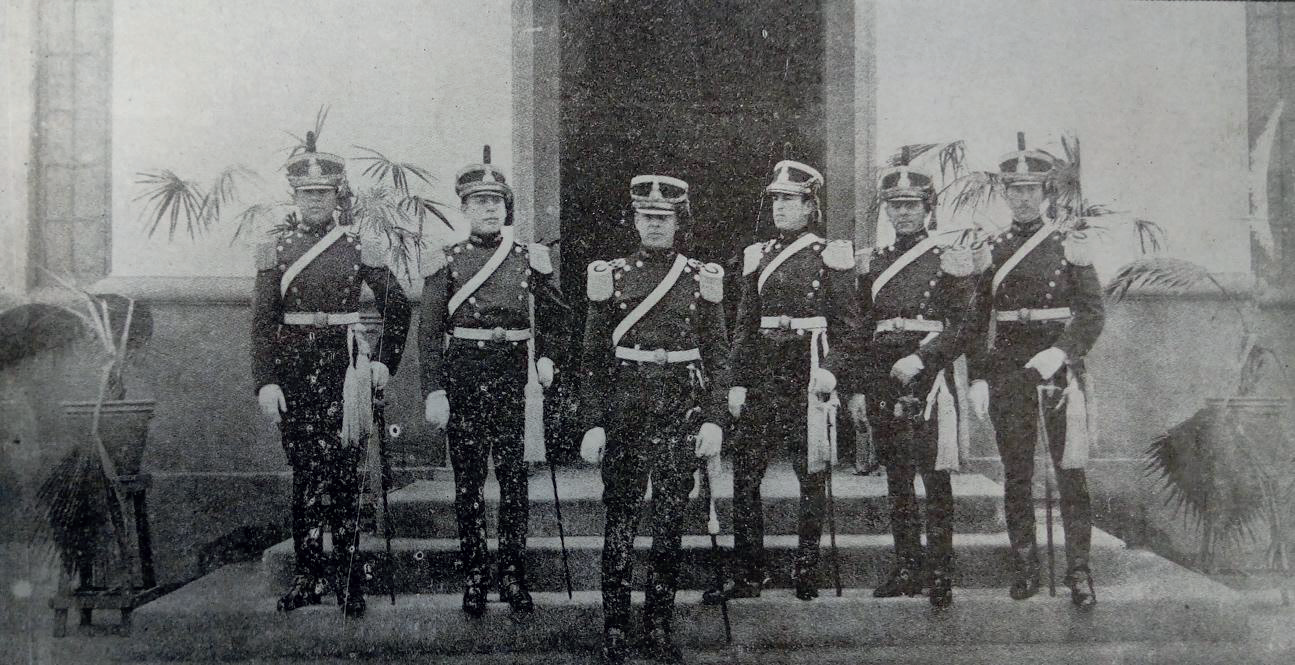
Argentine grenadiers at the barracks in 1921.

The barracks were inaugurated by Augusto B. Leguía in 1921, alongside the adjacent avenue, as part of the projects carried out for the Centennial of the Independence of Peru. Named after José de San Martín (and originally after the battle of Junín prior to July 1921), the barracks were built to house the Mounted Grenadiers Regiment of the Argentine delegation that was visiting the country in its anniversary, with construction works beginning in 1918.

It was the first barracks to be built in what was then the outer limits of the city, designed by Manuel E. Rodríguez and housing the army's engineering service (SINGE) from 1964 until it moved to the Headquarters of the Peruvian Army in San Borja District in 1975. At the end of 1942, a barracks building and horse stables were built, and service houses were built four years later.

In 1964, under the initiative of the National Institute of Housing, a 7.38 ha terrain used by the barracks' cavalry was ceded in order to build the Santa Cruz residential complex (Spanish: Agrupamiento Santa Cruz, Residencial Santa Cruz).

On July 25, 1983, the installation was attacked alongside the Peruvian Investigative Police's headquarters in Miraflores (where two PIP members died), Kennedy Building (next to Miraflores Central Park), and the National Radio.

The 68,400 m^{2} barracks were subsequently auctioned due to their "lack of historic value" and demolished. Its sale to Pro Inversión had been considered since 2003, with a rehabilitation hospital almost being built in its premises in 2004. A large part of the terrain was acquired by the GMV-Urbi Consortium, which plans to build a commercial venue in the barracks' former premises.

== See also ==
- Avenida del Ejército
