= Diospi Suyana =

Diospi Jane Suyana

Geography
- Location: Curahuasi District, Abancay Province, Apurímac Region, Peru
- Coordinates: 13.5431°S 72.7067°W

Organisation
- Type: General

History
- Constructed: 24 May 2005
- Opened: 31 August 2007

Links
- Website: www.diospi-suyana.de
- Lists: Hospitals in Peru

Diospi Suyana is a hospital in Peru, commissioned by Klaus Dieter John and his wife Martina. "Diospi Suyana", meaning "god is our hope" in the local language of Quechua, is a Christian mission hospital in Curahuasi District, in the southern Department of Peru, Apurímac. The German sponsoring organisation was founded in Tabarz on 17 August 2002. The hospital offers healthcare for the indigenous Quechua people in Southern Peru. The basis for the interdenominational, evangelistic work of the hospital is the World Evangelical Alliance.

== The Concept ==
The hospital is located in the Andes of south Peru, in the Curahuasi District, at an altitude of 2,650m. Owing to its proximity to Cusco, Abancay and Lima, the hospital is relatively accessible. Within a 3-hour drive of the hospital live around 750,000 people, the vast majority of whom are Quechua-speaking. The clinic offers comprehensive medical care to the local people, providing support predominantly to the Quechua people, many of whom are unable to speak Spanish. The hospital includes 55 beds, 4 operating theatres, an intensive care unit, Laboratory and X-ray department. The staff includes approximately 110 Peruvian and 40 foreign workers. The building of the hospital began on 24 May 2005. In attendance at the official opening of the hospital on 31 August 2007 were over 4,500 people, including the Peruvian First Lady at the time, Pilar Nores de Garcia, and the Peruvian health minister, Dr. Carlos Vallejos. Since then the Dental and Eye clinics have been added to the hospital.

In April 2012 the Diospi-Suyana-Children's clubhouse was built and hosts the children's clubs weekly.

The Diopsi-Suyana-School was set up in March 2014. The school and pre-school offers the opportunity of education to 650 children.

The German sponsoring organisation was founded in Tabarz on 17 August 2002 by 10 people. The building work began on 24 May 2005. And the official opening of the Hospital took place on 31 August 2007 with over 4,500 people attending.

== Funding ==
An estimated 50,000 individuals and 180 companies have supported the different Diospi Suyana projects up until August 2005 with donations from totalling around 20.5 million USD. With these donations the hospital team, dental clinic, eye clinic, children's clubhouse and school have all been funded. This money has also been used to support the treatment of around 125,000 patients.

Diospi Suyana is one of the largest employers in the Apurímac Region; with currently around 140 Peruvians employed in the hospital and school. The long-term work of the hospital is covered by an international support network, consisting in May 2014 of exactly 945 people. A further source of income for the hospital is through the Diospi-Suyana foundation. The patients contribute around 30% of the hospital's monthly budget through treatment costs. The Peruvian authorities contribute by a reimbursement of VAT and reduced price electricity provision.

Diospi Susana is registered as a charitable organisation in Peru, Germany and the USA. The German newspaper "Die Welt" published in 2008 a piece holding Diospi Suyana up as an example of excellence in relation to the use of charitable spending.

== Aims ==
The aims of Diospi Suyana include: improving the medical care of the local people (Campesinos) through community and inpatient care, training of local nurses, medical campaigns to the surrounding towns, collaborative work with the government-provisioned local healthcare teams, education of patients on healthy living and prevention of common medical conditions, and, through donations, reduced-cost treatment for patients.

The promotion of education for children in the District of Curahuasi is being achieved through the building and long term maintenance of a Christian school of international standard, the imparting of Christian values through Bible-based teaching, the use of modern teaching techniques, and is ultimately providing the children with better future prospects. Scholarships are available for children with lesser means through individual sponsorship; the children are all treated equally regardless of race or class.

The Gospel of Jesus Christ is furthered in conjunction with the local church through the hospital chaplain, Christian literature, films, the life and testimony of the missionaries, children's work, women's- and men's- work, social projects, the involvement of the missionaries in the local churches. As a member of the World Evangelical Alliance, the hospital rejects scientific consensus like the Theory of Evolution and seeks to openly raise doubts to their credibility.

The local Quechua - Peruvian culture is respected and appreciated: the hospital and school are named in Quechua, a Quechua course is taught in the Colegio Diospi Suyana (the Diospi School), the patients, and the children in the school, are treated with respect, the school and hospital provide training opportunities for local employees.

A collaborative partnership exists between Diospi Suyana and Christians and churches in Europe and worldwide. Awareness across the industrialised nations of the issues the South American people are facing is being raised through regular sharing of information (magazine articles, letters, films) about the hospital and school in churches; visiting groups who input into particular hospital or school projects for a short period, as well as information and the holding of presentations.

== See also ==
- Healthcare in Peru

== Bibliography ==
- Klaus-Dieter John: "I Have Seen God: The Miraculous Story Of The Diospi Suyana Hospital In Peru". 1st Edition. Monarch Books 2014, ISBN 978-0857215741. Available in English, German, Spanish and Romanian.
- Klaus-Dieter John: "'Gott hat uns gesehen.' Diospi Suyana - eine Geschichte geht um die Welt". 2. Auflage. Brunnen, Gießen 2015, ISBN 978-3-7655-0930-8. English version to follow
- Jenet und Geroff Benge. "Klaus-Dieter John (Christian Heroes Then and Now)". YWAM Publishing 2014. ISBN 978-1576587553. Available in English, German and Spanish.
