= Church of the Immaculate Heart of Mary (Lima) =

Church in Peru

Coordinates: 12°05′13″S 77°04′08″W

- Iglesia del Inmaculado Corazón de María
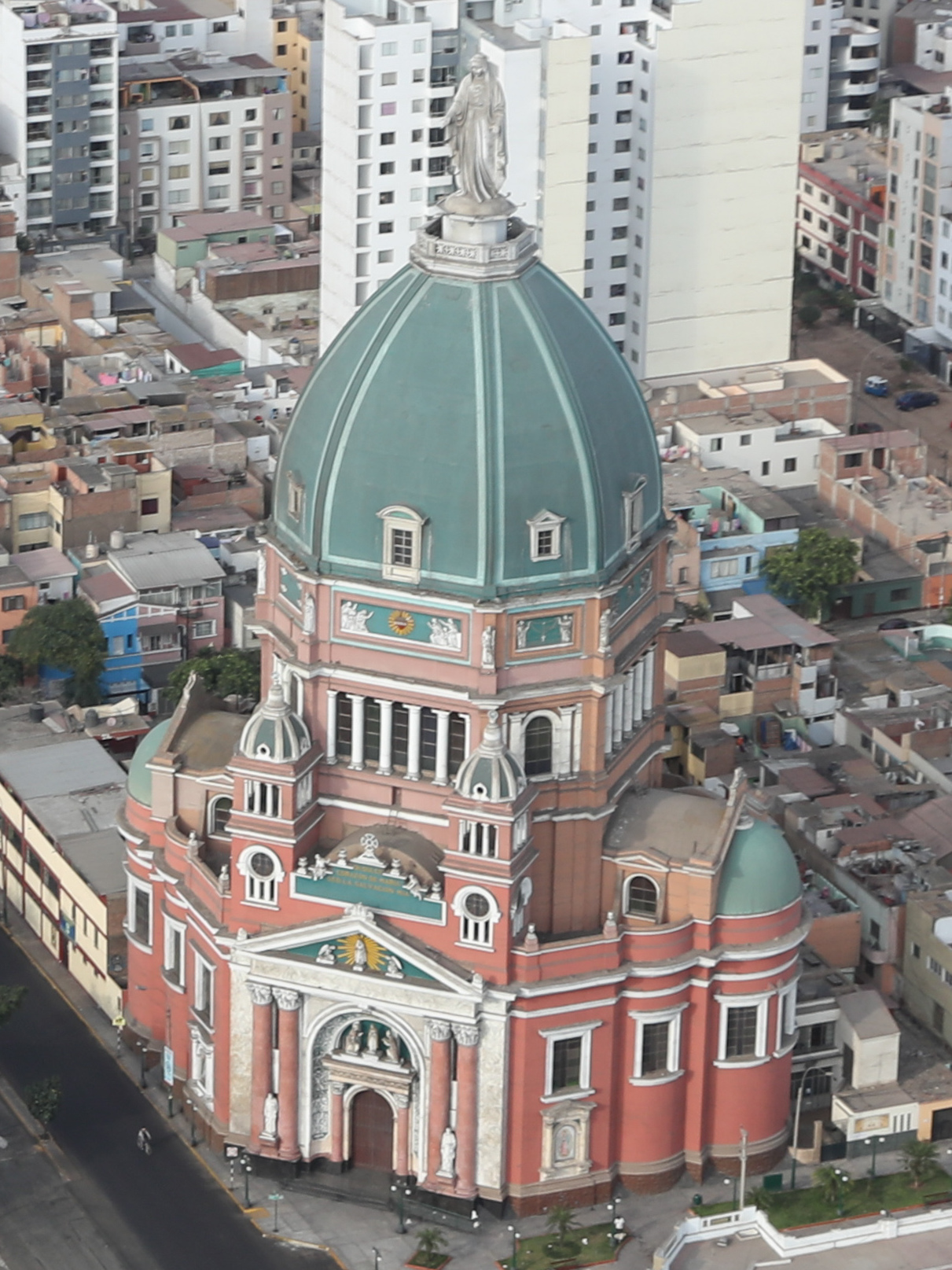
- Aerial view in 2020

Religion
- Affiliation: Catholicism

Location
- Location: Magdalena del Mar, Lima
- Interactive map of Church of the Immaculate Heart of Mary

Architecture
- Style: Renaissance Revival
- Completed: 1957
- Height (max): 69 m

The Church of the Immaculate Heart of Mary (Spanish: Iglesia del Inmaculado Corazón de María), commonly known as The Dome (Spanish: La Cúpula), is a Catholic church located in the intersection of Antonio José de Sucre Avenue and Jirón 28 de Julio, in Magdalena del Mar District, Lima, Peru.

The work was conceived by the Claretian priest Simón Llobet. Since 1957, the year of its inauguration, it has become one of the most visible religious and architectural symbols of the city despite its great demographic growth. It is the tallest church in Lima. The works were financed through donations and charitable events.

== Architecture ==
The church sports a neo-Renaissance style architectural finish that ends in a dome on which rests the image of the Virgin Mary with open arms, 6.5 m high, made from resin and fibreglass by the sculptor Fredy Luque Sonco. Brought in parts from Arequipa, it was hoisted in January 2006 during recovery works.

Its characteristic pink and green colours have been maintained over the years, gaining splendour thanks to the restoration works on both the façade and inside the temple; in addition to the general repainting. The lighting company Enel was in charge of providing exterior lighting.

The bells were acquired thanks to donations from through the efforts of the women of Acción Católica.

Initially, the statue of the Virgin, built in 1956, located in the Monument to the Immaculate Heart of Mary and a few streets from the temple towards the coast, had been designed to be located at the top of the dome. However, due to its weight of more than four tons, it was impossible to locate it in that place. For that reason, it remained stored for forty years until it was finally placed in 1996 in the homonymous square at the end of Brazil Avenue.

== See also ==
- Roman Catholic Archdiocese of Lima
- List of tallest church buildings
