= Avenida Brasil =

Avenida Brasil may refer to:

- Avenida Brasil (TV series), a Brazilian telenovela
- Avenida Brasil (Rio de Janeiro), a road in Rio de Janeiro, the capital city of the Brazilian State of Rio de Janeiro

and many other roads of the same name in other cities worldwide:

In Brazil

- Avenida Brasil (Belo Horizonte), a road in Belo Horizonte, the capital city of the Brazilian State of Minas Gerais
- Avenida Brasil (Cachoeira do Sul), a road in Cachoeira do Sul
- Avenida Brasil (Campinas), a road in Campinas, a large city from the State of São Paulo
- Avenida Brasil (Manaus), a road in Manaus, the capital city of the Brazilian State of Amazonas
- Avenida Brasil (São Paulo), a road in São Paulo, the capital city of the Brazilian State of São Paulo

In other countries

- Avenida Brasil (Buenos Aires), a road in Buenos Aires, the capital city of Argentina
- Avenida Brasil (Lima), a road in Lima, the capital city of Peru
- Avenida Brasil (Santiago de Chile), a road in Santiago de Chile, the capital city of Chile
- Avenida Brasil (Valparaíso), a road in Valparaíso, Chile
- Avenida Brasil (Montevideo), a road in Montevideo, the capital city of Uruguay
