= Avenida Brasil (Lima) =

Avenue in Peru

Brazil Avenue
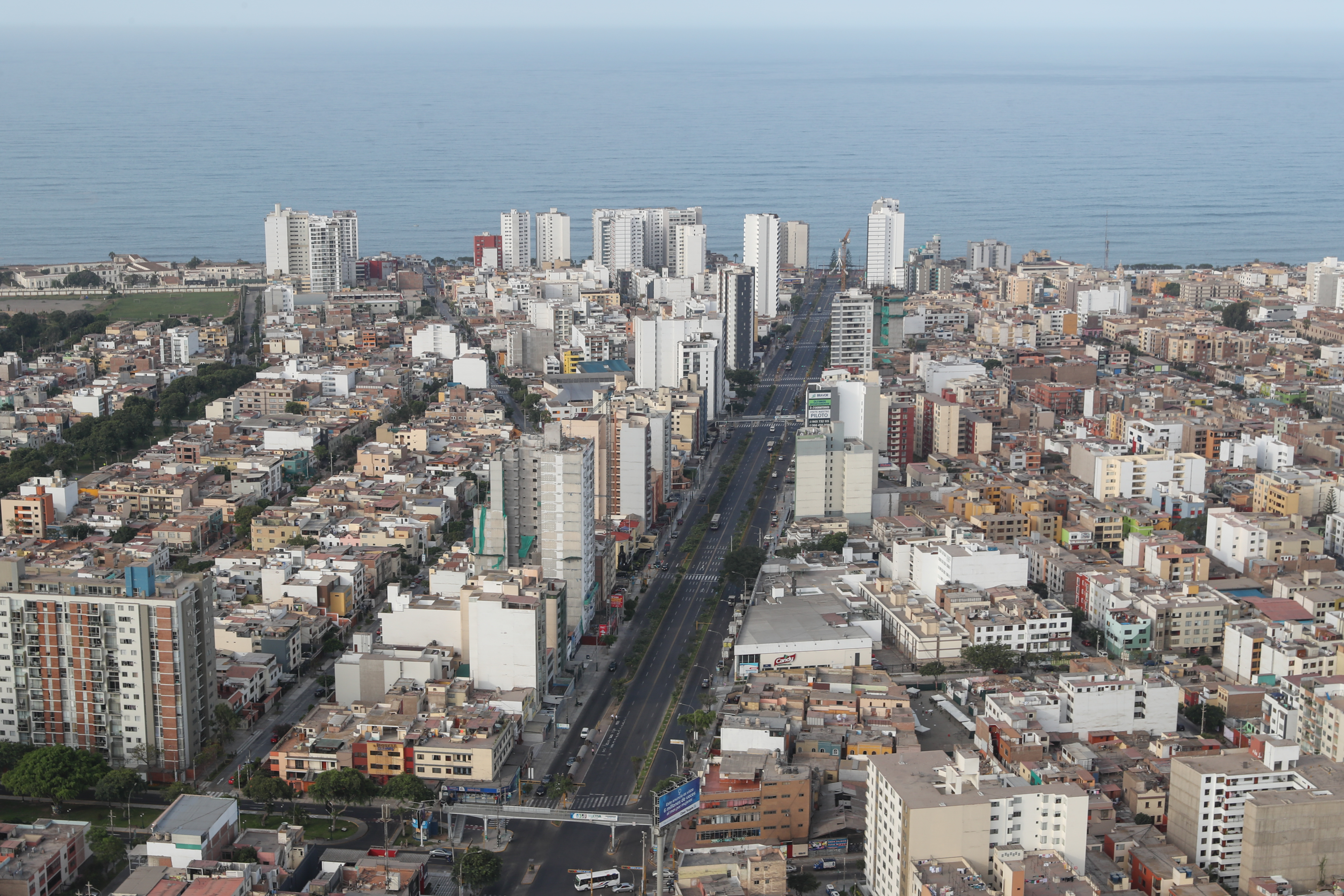
- Southern view of the avenue
- Namesake: Brazil
- From: Plaza Bolognesi
- Major junctions: Avenida 28 de Julio, Avenida San Felipe, Avenida la Marina, Avenida Faustino Sánchez Carrión
- To: Avenida del Ejército

Construction
- Inauguration: 1890s

Brazil Avenue (Spanish: Avenida Brasil), formerly known as Magdalena or Piérola, is a major avenue in Lima, Peru. It crosses the districts of Lima, Breña, Jesús María, Pueblo Libre, and Magdalena del Mar. It has a total length of forty-two city blocks.

The avenue, which starts at the Plaza Bolognesi and ends at the Monument to the Immaculate Heart of Mary, is the location of the annual Great Military Parade of Peru since 1961.

== History ==
The avenue was originally a dirt road that joined the city of Lima with Magdalena Vieja, then a town separate from the city after which it was named. It was inaugurated by then president Nicolás de Piérola during his second government. With the expansion of the city in the 20th century, houses began to be built in the avenue, and a tram service started operating on its path.

Since 1960, the road is the location of the Great Military Parade of Peru. Prior to this decision, the parade was held in different places of the city, such as the Plaza Mayor (1822), the Plaza Bolívar (1921), and the Campo de Marte (1930s).

In January 1974, construction of an overpass began in its intersection with La Marina avenue, which concluded around June 27 of the same year. As part of these works, gates were added along a 100-metre section of the avenue, which remained until 1982 due to reportedly causing accidents. Four years later, in 1986, the avenue was made a two-way road, with trees also being added.

On November 24, 2019, a truck belonging to the Norcom Corporation S.A.C (operating as Trans Norcom S.A.C.) lost its roof after impacting with the underside of the overpass at 8 a.m. Eight people were hurt in the incident, including the driver.

== Route ==
The avenue starts at the Plaza Bolognesi. Its first two blocks host a number of houses built in the 1920s, as well as the Mary Help of Christians Church. Down the path are a number of schools, including a Salesian school. Near its intersection with the Avenida 28 de Julio is the National Institute of Child Health, inaugurated on November 1, 1929, by then president Augusto B. Leguía in honour of his late wife, Julia Swayne y Mariátegui.

The 14th block of the avenue was the site the Rosa de América school, originally a country house of Leguía, who inaugurated the stadium of the Circolo Sportivo Italiano in 1922, located behind the building. On the 15th block, a Synagogue was built in 1958, located next to a Jewish school, and eventually demolished during the 1980s.

On the 22nd and 23rd blocks of the avenue, where its intersection with San Felipe Avenue is located, is the óvalo, the location of the main tribune of the annual military parade. Further down the path is the "Gral. PNP Luis N. Sánchez" Central Police Hospital, inaugurated by then president Manuel Prado y Ugarteche in 1961, and the Central Military Hospital, inaugurated by Manuel A. Odría in 1956.

The avenue comes to an end at the Monument to the Immaculate Heart of Mary, inaugurated in 1996.

== See also ==
- Great Military Parade of Peru
