= Víctor Larco Herrera Hospital =

Former hospital in Peru

Coordinates: 12.0989274°S 77.065739°W

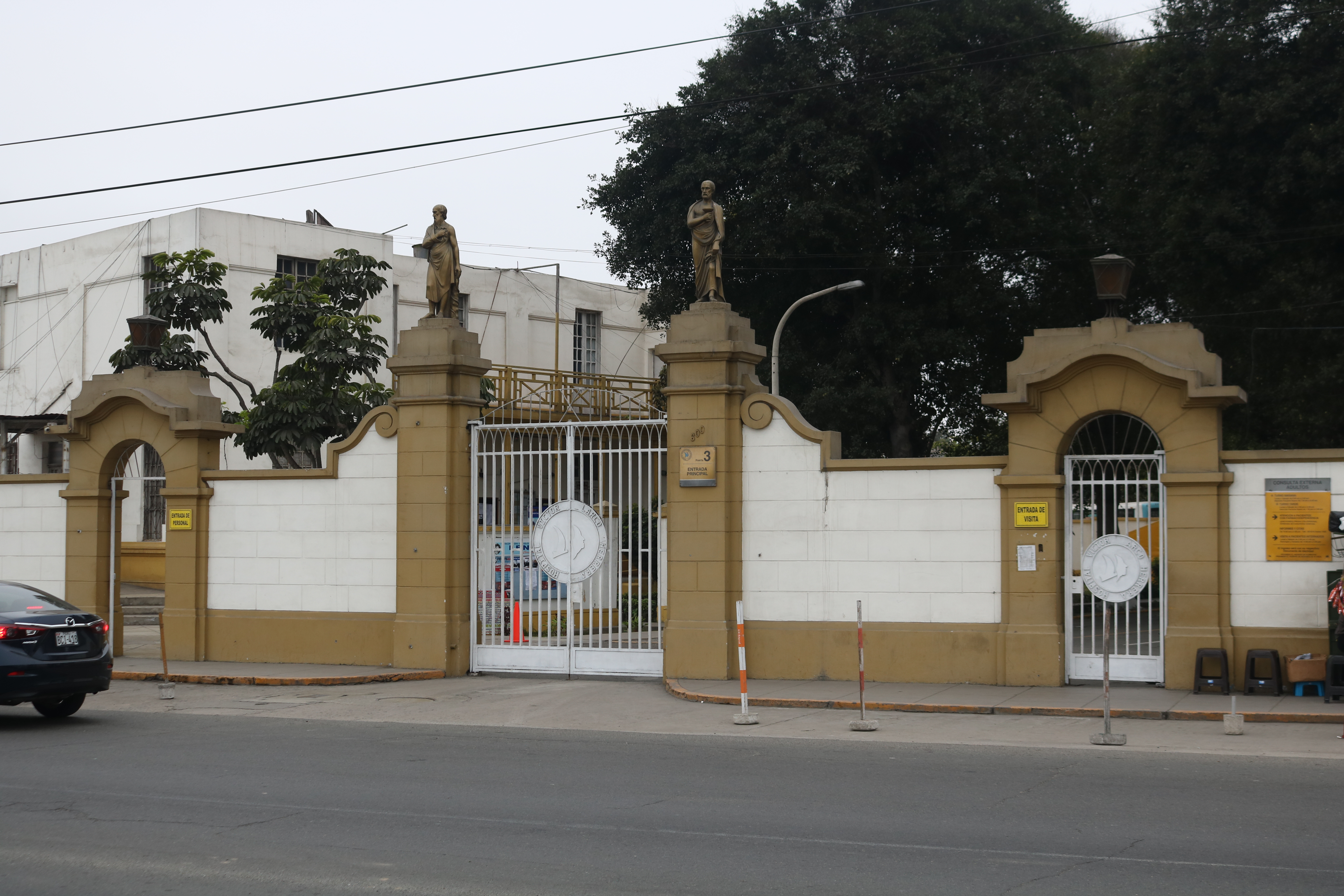

Geography
- Location: Av. del Ejército 600

History
- Opened: January 1, 1918

Links
- Website: Government site

Víctor Larco Herrera National Hospital (Spanish: Hospital Nacional Víctor Larco Herrera) is a psychiatric establishment founded in 1918 in the district of Magdalena del Mar, Lima, Peru.

== History ==
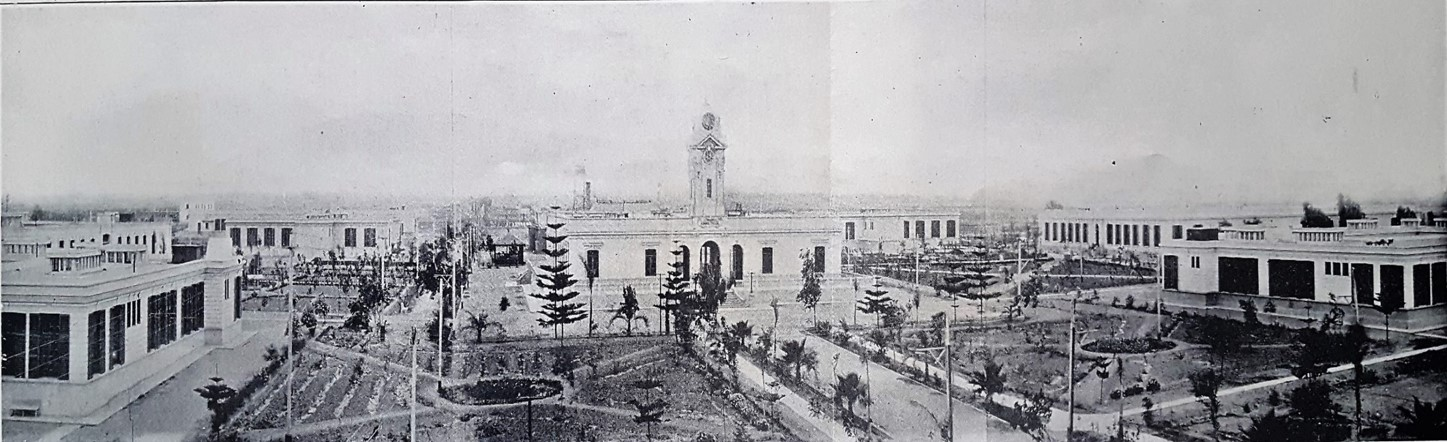
The hospital in 1920.

On January 1, 1918, the Asilo Colonia de la Magdalena was inaugurated as an establishment for the care of the mentally ill in the city of Lima, which replaced the old Hospital Civil de la Misericordia. Its first director was the doctor Hermilio Valdizán. On January 1, 1919, the landowner and philanthropist Víctor Larco Herrera was appointed inspector of the Asylum, who donated the sum of S/. 1 million for the expansion of the new hospital. In 1921 the asylum took the name of its benefactor as its eponym and in 1930 it was renamed the "Víctor Larco Herrera" Hospital, a name it retains to this day.

== See also ==
- Hospital Civil de la Misericordia
