= Manuel Bonilla Elhart =

Peruvian child soldier and war hero

Manuel Bonilla
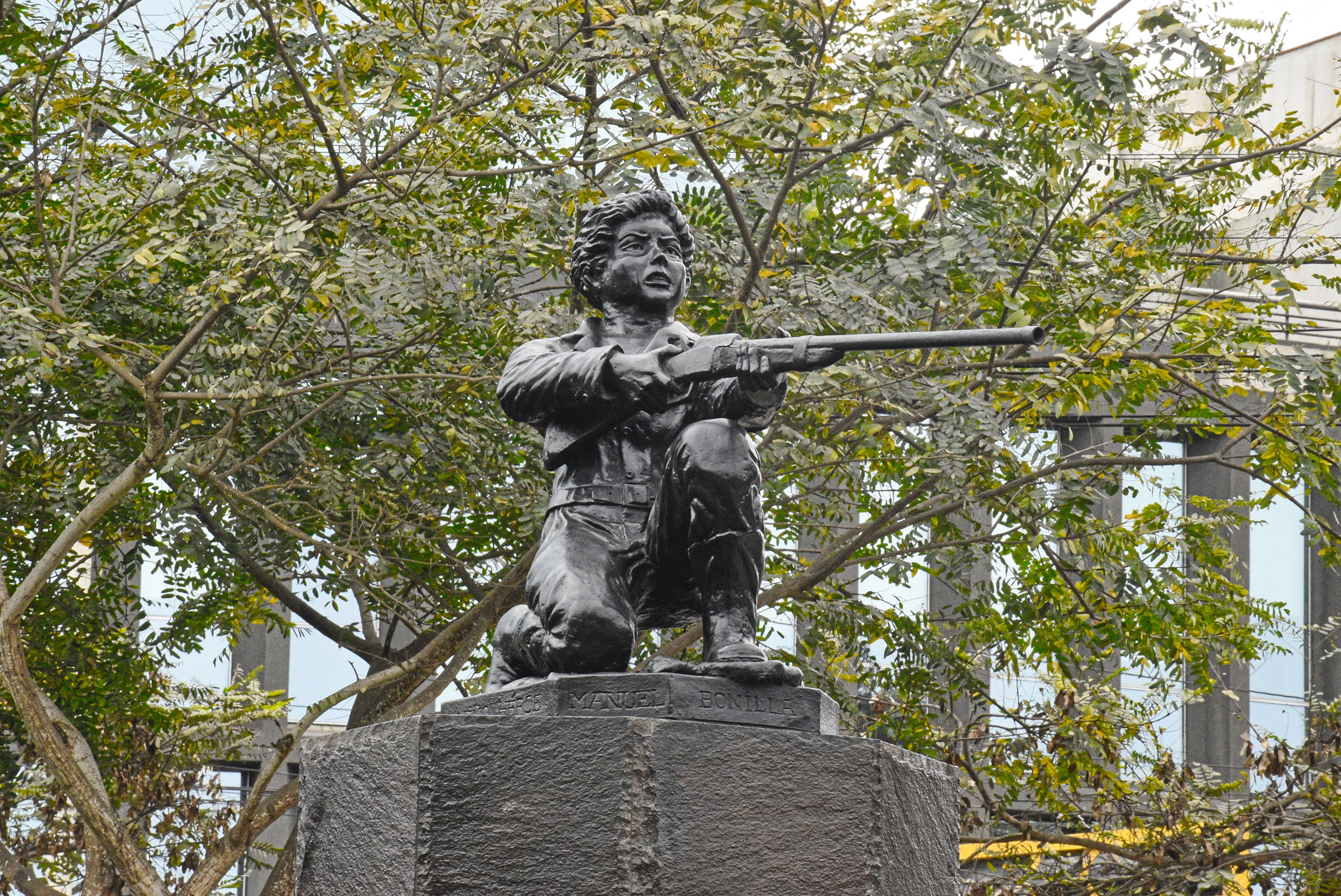
- Statue at Parque Reducto № 2
- Born: 1868; Callao, Peru
- Died: January 15, 1881 (aged 12–13); Lima, Peru
- Burial place: Presbítero Maestro
- Military career
- Allegiance: Peru
- Branch: Peruvian Army
- Service years: 1881
- Nickname: El niño héroe
- Conflicts: War of the Pacific: Battle of Miraflores †

Manuel Fernando Bonilla Elhart (1868–1881) was a Peruvian child soldier and war hero who was killed by a grenade while fighting in the battle of Miraflores during the War of the Pacific.

== Biography ==
Bonilla was born in 1868, the son of Juan Francisco Bonilla, who was the organizer of the Huáscar squadron in the north of Peru (in Chiclayo). He was a student at the College of Our Lady of Guadalupe when the War of the Pacific began between Chile and Peru, volunteering to join the Peruvian Army at the age of 13 to defend the city against the imminent Chilean Army. Originally rejected for his short age, he was accepted to assist with the deliveries of ammunition during the battle.

Bonilla joined the 280-men 6th battalion, under the leadership of Narciso de la Colina in the city's third redoubt, in the La Palma estate of Miraflores. The battle started at 2 p.m. on January 15, 1881. In contrast to the occupying army of General Manuel Baquedano, the defense in Lima included civilians from different backgrounds and social classes. Bonilla was near Colina when he was fatally shot, being also hit by the same bullet. Despite his injury, he grabbed a nearby rifle from a corpse and started firing, being killed in an explosion caused by either a grenade or a projectile, with his body destroyed beyond recognition.

In his honour, a street and a sports complex are named after him.

== See also ==
- Battle of Miraflores
