= Julia Swayne y Mariátegui =

First Lady of Peru (1868–1919)

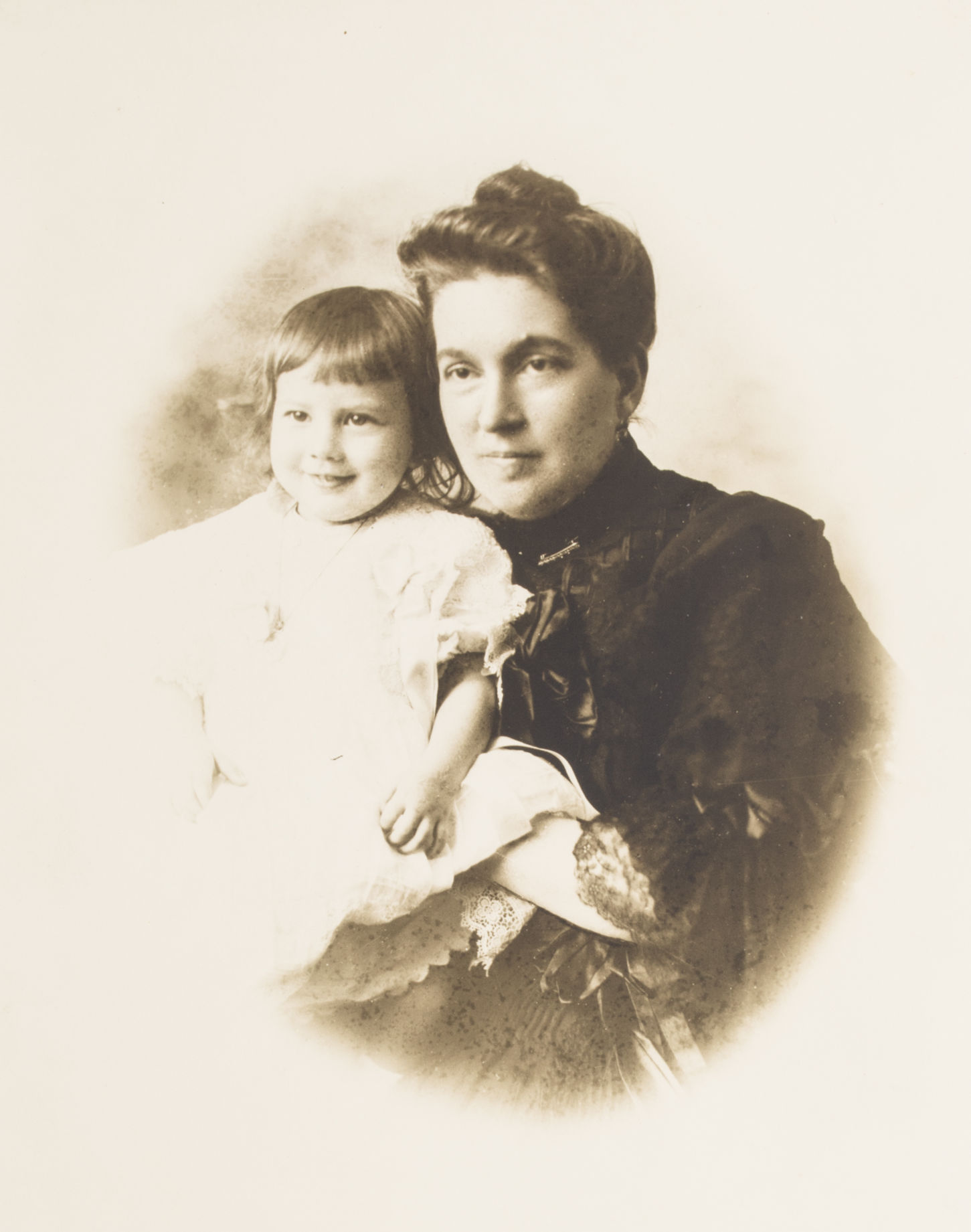
- Leguía with her daughter

First Lady of Peru
- In office July 4, 1919 – September 20, 1919
- President: Augusto B. Leguía
- Preceded by: Carmen Heeren Barreda
- Succeeded by: María Isabel Olivera Mayo
- In office September 24, 1908 – September 24, 1912
- Preceded by: Carmen Heeren Barreda
- Succeeded by: María Emilia Rodríguez Prieto

Personal details
- Born: March 16, 1868 Lima, Peru
- Died: September 20, 1919 London, United Kingdom
- Resting place: Presbítero Maestro
- Spouse: Augusto B. Leguía (m. 1890)
- Children: 6
- Education: Colegio Sagrados Corazones Belén

Julia Josefa Swayne y Mariátegui (March 16, 1868 — September 20, 1919) was a Peruvian socialite and heiress who served as First Lady of Peru from 1908 to 1912, and briefly in 1919, as the wife of Augusto B. Leguía, two-time president of Peru. The National Institute of Child Health, inaugurated in 1929, was dedicated to her memory.

== Biography ==
Swayne was born on March 16, 1868, in Lima. Her parents were Henry Swayne Wallace (October 28, 1800 — January 29, 1877) and Lucía Virginia Mariátegui y Palacio, who married on May 30, 1853. Her father was a Scottish businessman, originally from Dysart and a practising Anglican, baptised on November 23, 1800. He had first visited Peru in 1824, and a supporter of the horse racing scene. In 1845, he established an import and export business at Calle de la Coca 172, in Lima, a branch of the Liverpool-based Swayne Reid & Co. operated by his brother Robert. He acquired the sugarcane estates at La Quebrada and Casa Blanca, as well as El Chilcal, Ungará, La Huaca and Santa Bárbara in Cerro Azul, and Motocache in Nepeña. Her mother was the fourth child of Francisco Javier Mariátegui y Tellería, a national hero of Peru, and Juana Palacio y Salas. She was born on May 16, 1800, and baptised at the Iglesia del Sagrario.

The family owned two homes, one in Chorrillos and another one in Lima. The latter was located at the Calle de Pando, and originally owned by the heirs of the counts of San Javier y Casa Laredo. She studied at the Colegio Sagrados Corazones Belén, then sent to London to continue her studies. Upon her return to Lima, she married Augusto B. Leguía, then a representative of the New York Life Insurance Company, on December 8, 1890. During the War of the Pacific, Swayne's father used his funds and diplomatic immunity to provide munitions to Peru. Upon her father's death, she became the manager of his company, the British Sugar Company. He was buried at the British Cemetery.

The general election of 1912 saw the victory of Guillermo Billinghurst, who was supported by Leguía and his political circle with the understanding that he would continue his government's plans. Billinghurst ignored the agreement, which led to political instability and culminated in a nighttime attack on the residences of Rafael Villanueva Urquijo (a supporter of Leguía and president of the Senate) and of the Leguía-Swayne family. Dynamite was used by a crowd of about 150 people, and the attack was repelled by Leguía's children, while guests of the dinner being held at the time were asked to leave through neighbouring rooftops. Once law enforcement arrived, they arrested Leguía as an aggressor and took him to the penitentiary.

During the events, Swayne took refuge at Felipe de la Torre's neighbouring residence. Months later, she would travel to England with her daughters Lola, Carmen Rosa and María Isabel, in order to meet her exiled husband, who had moved to Holland Park in 1913. Horrified at the events, she would later state that she would only return to Peru to be buried. Swayne eventually died in London, at number 28 of Holland Park, W.11, on September 20, 1919. She was about to sail back home to accompany her husband, once again president of Peru, who would go on to govern the country until 1930.

== See also ==
- Aristocratic Republic (Peru)
- History of Peru (1919–1930)
