= Manuel Bonilla Sports Complex =

Sports complex in Lima, Peru

Coordinates: 12.1100°S 77.0528°W

- Complejo Deportivo Manuel Bonilla
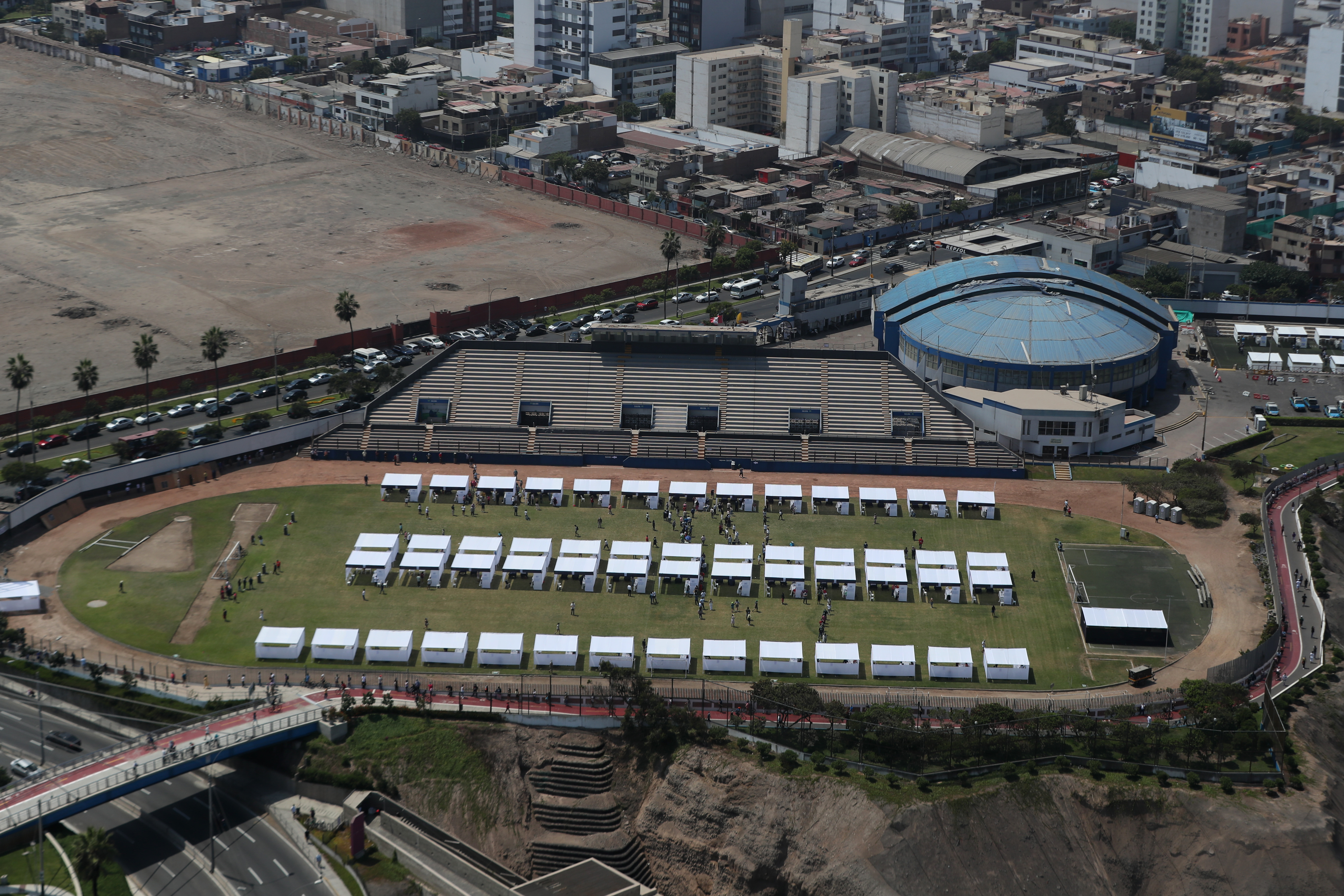
- Interactive map of Manuel Bonilla Sports Complex
- Full name: Child Hero Manuel Bonilla Sports Complex
- Location: Miraflores District, Lima
- Main venue: Manuel Bonilla Stadium; Capacity: 3,000

Construction
- Opened: October 28, 1995
- Renovated: 2012

Child Hero Manuel Bonilla Municipal Sports Complex (Spanish: Complejo Deportivo Municipal Niño Héroe Manuel Bonilla), also known as the Municipal Stadium of Miraflores (Spanish: Estadio Municipal de Miraflores) is a sports complex in Miraflores District, Lima, Peru. It is named after Manuel Bonilla Elhart, a child soldier and war hero of the Peruvian Army who was killed in action during the War of the Pacific.

== History ==
The stadium was inaugurated on October 28, 1995. In 2010, it was visited by Evo Morales, then president of Bolivia. It was subsequently remodelled in 2012, with said works taking place from August to October. Remodellation works again took place in 2022, but were suspended in 2023 after local complaints.

On February 24, 2011, the Club Universitario de Deportes's female volleyball team was disqualified after a violent incident took place in the stadium's tribune, caused by a supporter of the club.

== See also ==
- Place of Memory, Tolerance and Social Inclusion, located next to the complex
- San Martín barracks, located in front of the complex
