= National Institute of Child Health =

Hospital in Lima, Peru

- Ministry of Health (MINSA)
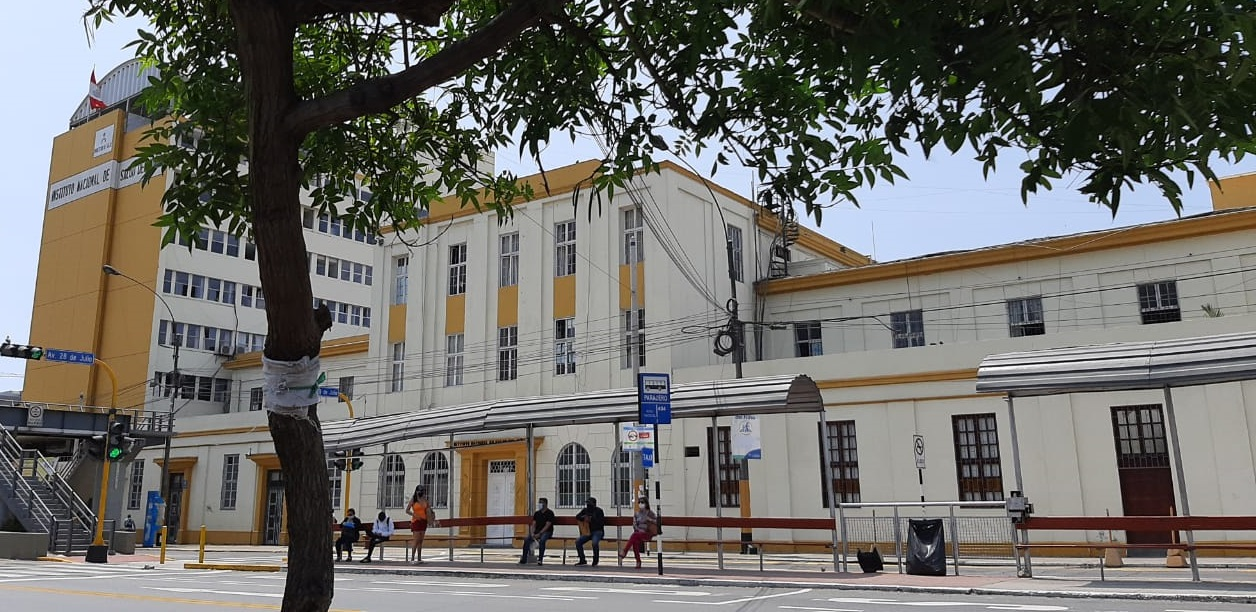
- Main building in Breña

Geography
- Location: Breña & San Borja, Lima, Peru

Organisation
- Type: Category III-2
- Religious affiliation: Catholicism

History
- Opened: November 1, 1929

Links
- Website: insn.gob.pe

The National Institute of Child Health (Spanish: Instituto Nacional de Salud del Niño; INSN), formerly known as the Hospital del Niño, is a children's hospital in Lima, Peru. It belongs to the Ministry of Health's healthcare system, and operates two health centres in the city's districts of Breña and San Borja. The original centre was inaugurated in 1929, and currently functions as an institute for technological and cientific investigation. A second building was inaugurated in 2013 with a focus in surgery, also serving as the destination for patients transported from elsewhere in the country.

== History ==
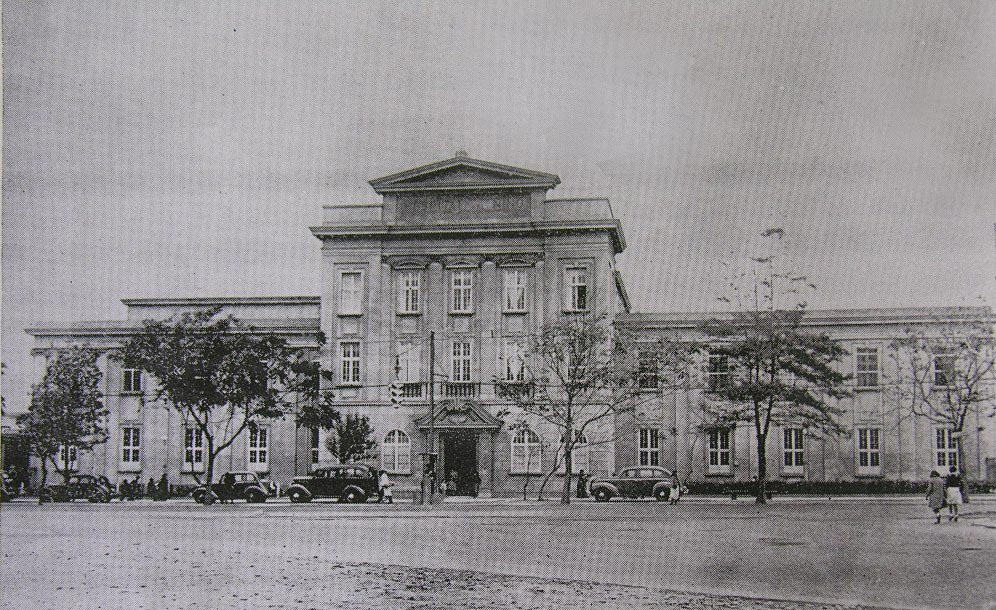
The hospital in the 1920s.

The medical centre was inaugurated on November 1, 1929, as the Hospital Julia Swayne de Leguía, named after the late wife of then president Augusto B. Leguía. The inauguration concluded six years of efforts undertaken by philanthropist Juana Alarco de Dammert, head of the Sociedad Auxiliadora de la Infancia (SAI). She arranged the purchase of a 11,872 m^{2} at Magdalena Avenue where the Clínica Pasteur (previously the Clínica Larré) had been operating. Its construction was funded both privately and through a tax on alcoholic and fermented beverages.

Construction began in 1924 under the administrative and financial supervision of a management committee of the SAI and under the technical supervision of a committee of the Ministry of Development, headed by Director-General for Healthcare, Sebastián Lorente Benel, who was joined by Francisco Graña and Gonzalo Carbajal. The project had a total cost of Lp. 171,806.

The hospital began operating on January 2, 1930, with outpatient clinics only. On the first day, only seven patients were seen, with a fee of fifty cents per consultation. Months later, in April 1930, inpatient services for surgical patients also began with the inauguration of ward number 4, with 20 beds. The hospital's first director was Dr. Carlos Krumdieck, a distinguished pediatrician and university professor, who, after the fall of Leguía, was replaced in November 1930 by Dr. Eduardo Goycochea. Under Goycochea's leadership, inpatient care was expanded to include the medical wards with pavilions 1 and 2, each with 24 beds. By early 1931, the hospital already had 150 children admitted. In 1939, two pavilions were inaugurated: one for tuberculosis patients and another for patients with infectious diseases. The number of beds increased to 350, and the number of doctors rose from 25 to 60. That same year, the Children's Hospital magazine began publication.

During the administration of Dr. Gilberto Morey Sotomayor (1950–1968), the longest in the hospital's history, the number of beds was increased to five hundred, new medical specialties were incorporated, modern instruments were acquired, and the physical infrastructure was expanded with the construction of an eight-story monoblock. By ministerial resolution of May 24, 1983, its name was changed to the National Institute of Child Health, which implied an orientation towards scientific and technological research, in addition to its assistance function.

=== New building ===
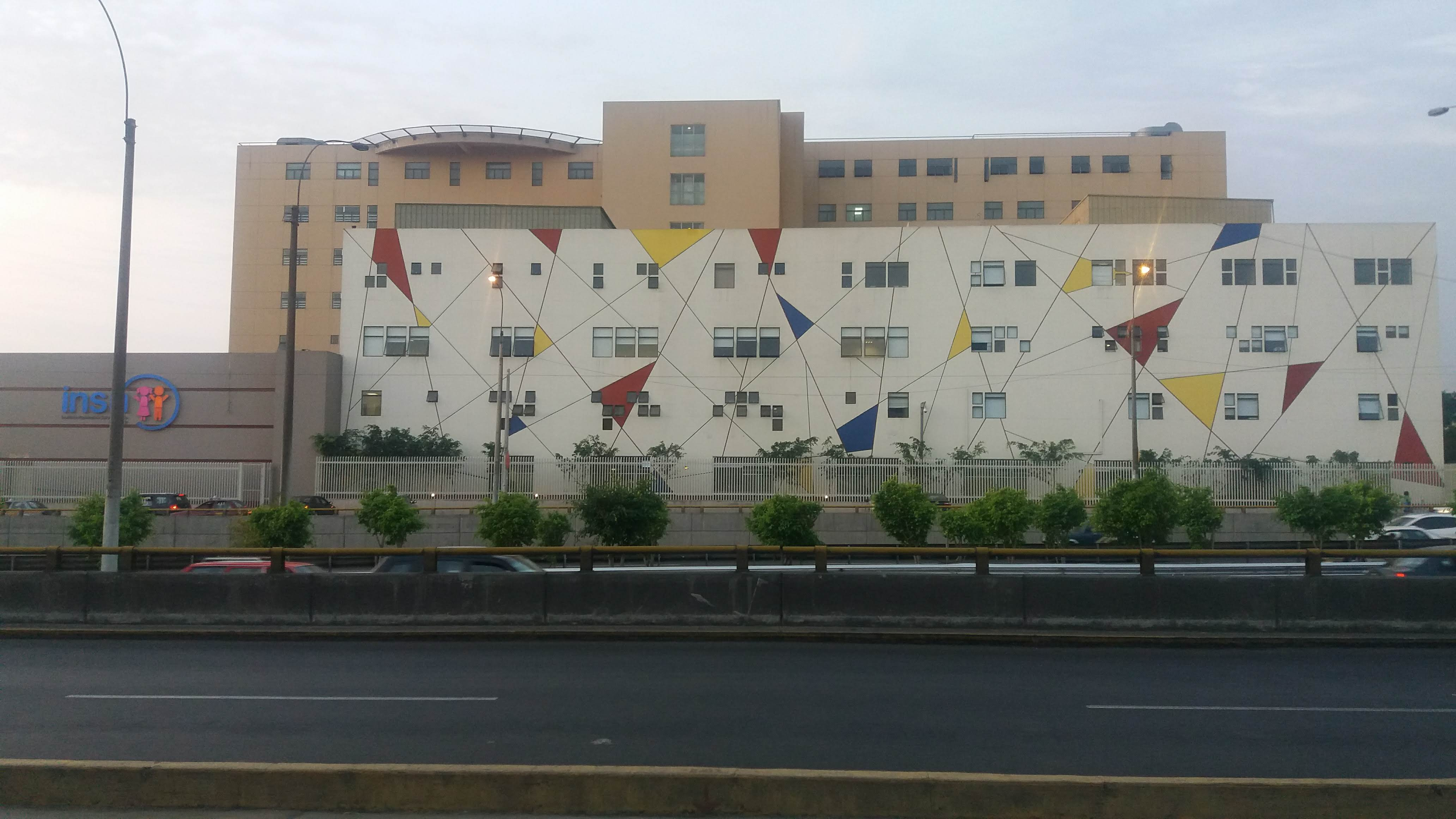
The new hospital in 2019.

Due to overcrowding, lack of space, and a growing hospital population, a new branch was inaugurated in 2013 in San Borja District. The new branch was initially envisioned by Alan García for its establishment during his second term; however, due to delays, it was inaugurated his successor, Ollanta Humala. The new centre is a highly complex, specialized pediatric surgical hospital that serves children, adolescents, and minors referred from other hospitals nationwide. It also boasts cutting-edge technology for telemedicine, tele-education, and remote management, making it the first hospital in Peru on the path to digitalization.

Since 2025, a Ronald McDonald House operates in the building.

== See also ==
- Juana Alarco de Dammert
