= Aenza =

Company based in Latin America

Aenza S.A.A.
- Type: Public
- Traded as: BVL: AENZAC1; NYSE: GRAM
- Industry: Engineering, Construction & Real Estate
- Founded: (1933)
- Headquarters: Lima, Peru
- Area served: Latin America
- Key people: Augusto Baertl Montori (Chairman); Luis Díaz Olivero CEO
- Revenue: ▲US$ 948.2 Million (2010)
- Net income: ▲US$ 97.1 Million(2010)
- Website: https://www.aenza.com.pe/inicio

Aenza (BVL: AENZAC1) is a company based in Latin America. It originated as a real estate and construction company, now the oldest and largest in Peru. Its many business interests include the construction of buildings and infrastructure, the energy and mining industries, and sanitation and highway services. It was founded in 1933, and in 1949 changed its name to Graña y Montero. Due to severe corruption scandals, the company changed its name to Aenza in November 2020.

== History ==
The first Gramovel contract was the construction of a private residence before the population of Lima reached half a million people. When Gramovel merged with Moris y Montero to become Graña & Montero they had already made their first overseas contract. In that year, they decided to construct the city of Talara. In 1983, Graña & Montero met its first 50 years and started a new stage. Graña & Montero has a constantly growing participation in major projects in the country. In 2013 the company was listed on the New York Stock Exchange.

== Major projects ==
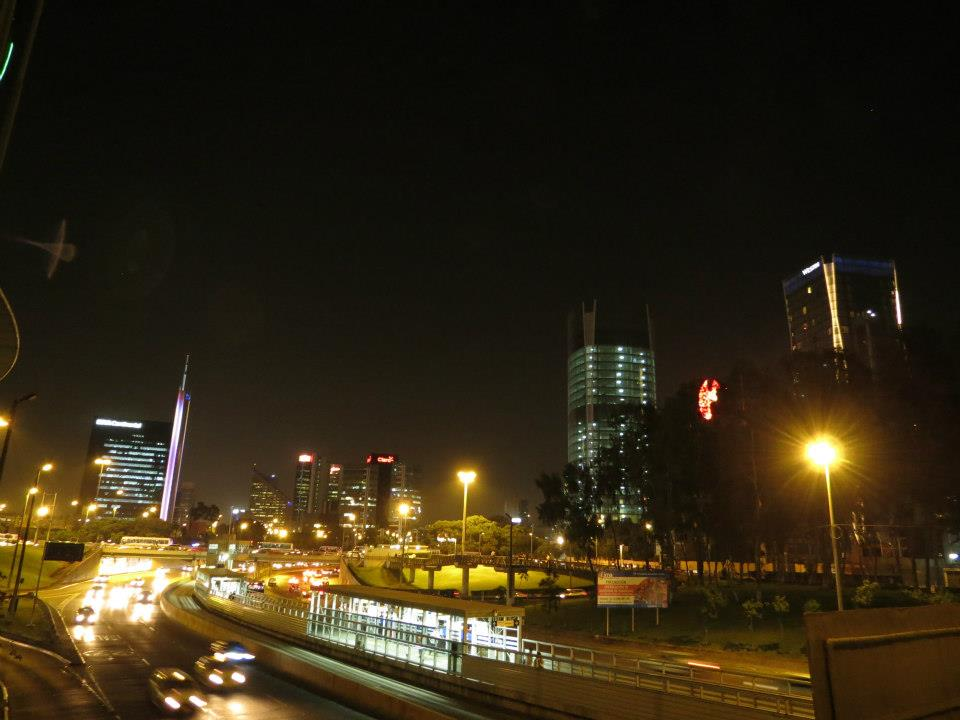
Paseo de la República Avenue, Lima

Aenza has built many large projects such as Larcomar, the Lima Sheraton Hotel, the Jorge Chávez International Airport, El Alto International Airport, the first Sears Roebuck store in Lima, the Four Seasons Hotel in Mexico City, the Interoceanic Highway, linking Peru and Brasil, the Westin Hotel in Lima, the tallest building in the country, the Camisea Gas Project and many big mining projects in Peru and Chile.

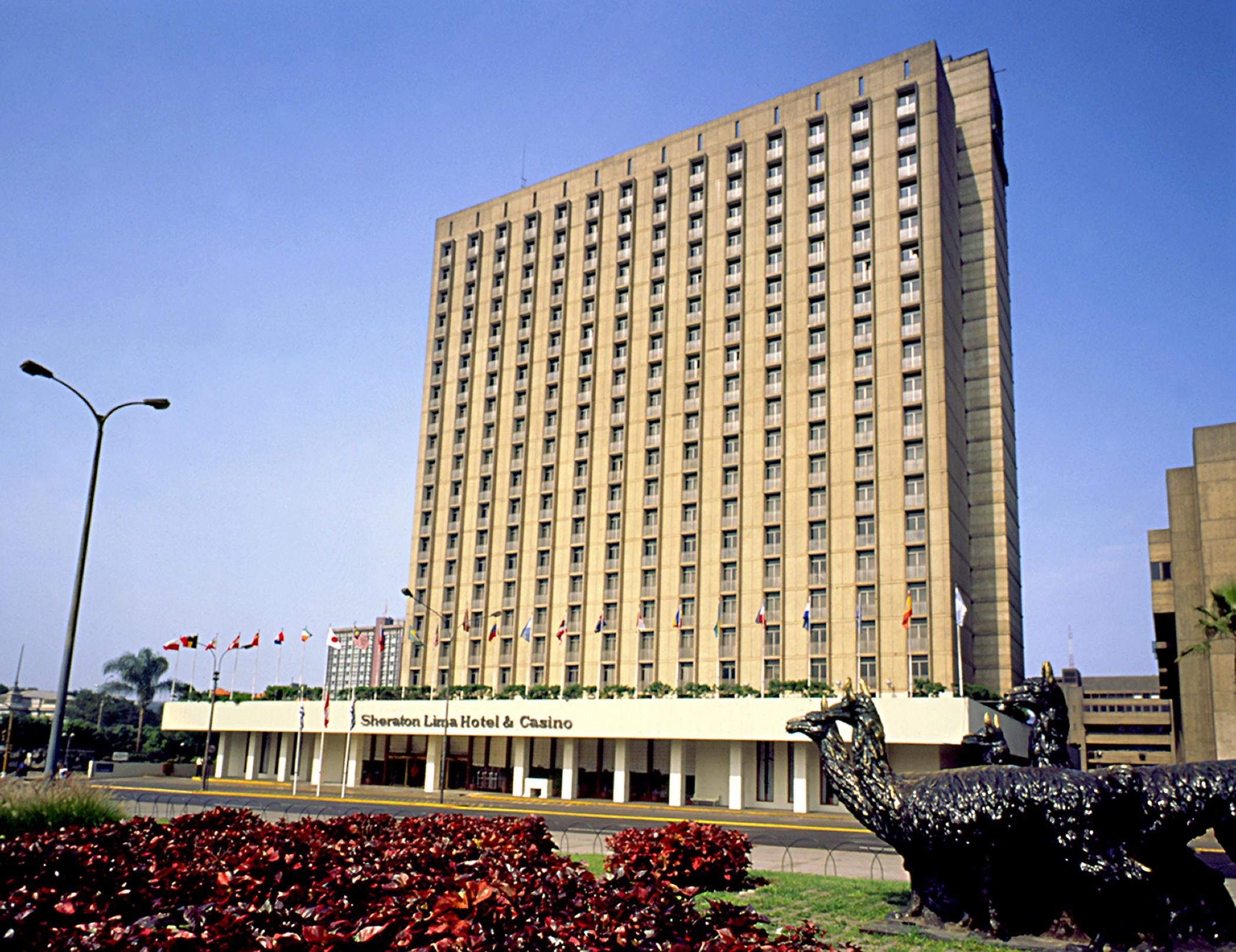
Sheraton Hotel in Lima

== Corruption Scandals ==
=== South Interoceanic Case: Conirsa Consortium ===
Graña y Montero partnered with the Odebrecht company for the execution of some projects in Peru, among which was the execution of the South Interoceanic highway sections 2 and 3. Due to Odebrecht's confession, of having made illicit payments for awarded projects in various Latin American countries, the Peruvian Prosecutor's Office opened an investigation process against the members of the Conirsa consortium (made up of Odebrecht, Graña y Montero, ICCGSA and JJC), in charge of the execution of said highway.

As part of the investigations, the directors of the different consortium companies were included in the preventive detention regime and later released to continue their process in freedom, thus guaranteeing the presumption of innocence and due process.

On December 22, 2017, the ad hoc Attorney for the Odebrecht case requested before the Judiciary that Graña y Montero be included in the investigation against former president Alejandro Toledo, because his partner in the Odebrecht project confessed to having made improper payments for US$20 million in exchange for obtaining the good offer in the tender for sections 2 and 3 of the Interoceanic highway.

=== Lima Metro Case: Electric Train Consortium ===
In 2009, during the second government of Alan García, Graña y Montero formed a consortium with Odebrecht called the Electric Train Consortium to execute Sections 1 and 2 of Line 1 of the Lima Metro. The contract was signed in December 2009 between the Consortium and the Ministry of Transport and Communications (MTC) of Peru through the emergency decree No. 032-2009 issued by President Alan García Pérez. The decree allowed to increase the budget for the work, transfer the administration from the Lima Metropolitan Municipality to the Ministry of Transport and Communications, and achieve that the investment project be exempt from the regulations of the National Public Investment System (SNIP).

On April 23, 2019, the Graña y Montero company was accused of illicit payments to the state after a former Odebrecht official, Jorge Barata, testified that both his company and GyM participated in a bribery scheme to win the tender for the construction work of Sections 1 and 2 on the Line 1 of the Lima Metro. Jorge Barata stated that Graña y Montero paid 3 million dollars as a bribe for the award of the work; the company's management declared that it had no knowledge to corroborate or deny that information. That day GyM's shares fell by 7.4% of their value on the Lima Stock Exchange. The mayor of Lima, Jorge Muñoz, declared that the company was no longer going to execute the Vía Expresa Sur project due to this background. The Comptroller General of the Republic has calculated the cost overrun of this work executed by the Electric Train Consortium at 400 million dollars. 18
