= Curahuasi District =

Coordinates: 14.062°S 72.670°W

Curahuasi Kuraqwasi
- District
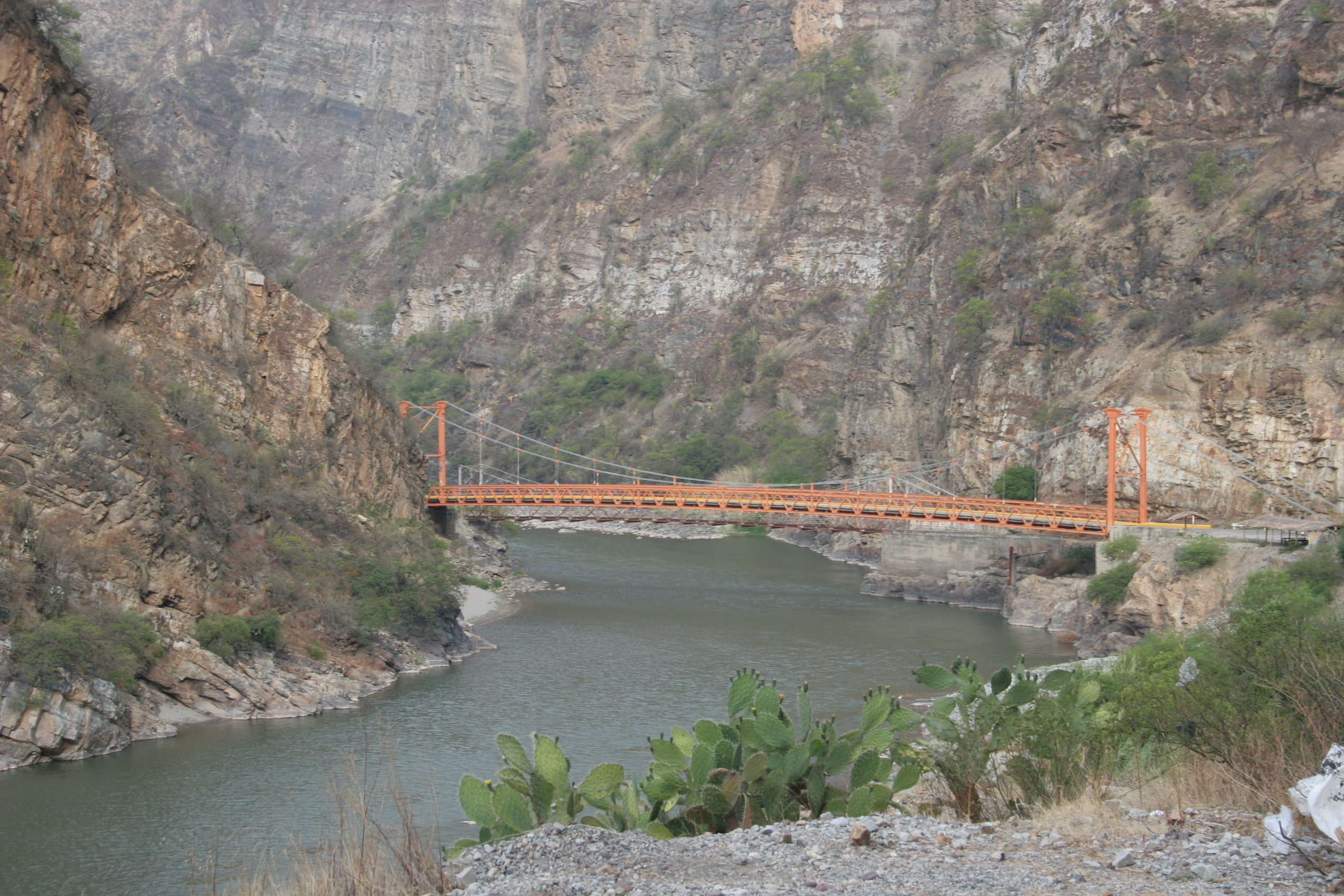
- Bridge across the Apurímac River on the border of the regions Cusco and Apurímac between the districts Curahuasi and Mollepata
- Interactive map of Curahuasi
- Country: Peru
- Region: Apurímac
- Province: Abancay
- Founded: January 2, 1857
- Capital: Curahuasi

Government
  - Mayor: Danilo Valenza Calvo

Area
  - Total: 817.98 km^{2} (315.82 sq mi)
- Elevation: 2,688 m (8,819 ft)

Population (2005 census)
  - Total: 18,556
  - Density: 22.685/km^{2} (58.754/sq mi)
- Time zone: UTC-5 (PET)
- UBIGEO: 030104

Curahuasi District is one of the nine districts of the Abancay Province in Peru.

== Geography ==
One of the highest peaks of the district is Q'illu Q'asa at approximately 4,600 m (15,100 ft). Other mountains are listed below:

- Aqu Q'asa
- Chaka Chaka
- Chunkara
- Chuqi Marka
- Ch'illkani
- Ch'uru
- Chhullunku Pata
- Inka Pirqa
- Kiska Pata
- Kunturillu
- Mulli Kamayuq
- Mulliyuq
- Muru Qucha
- Nasa Q'ara
- Pirwata
- Puka T'uyuyuq
- Pukara
- Quri Phaqcha
- Q'iwiri
- Silla Q'asa
- Tika Qaqa
- T'asta Q'asa
- T'utura Qucha
- Urpi Utt'aña
- Urquni
- Waman Ayri
- Waman Marka
- Wank'a Wank'a
- Warmi Awqa
- Wasa Qhata
- Wichinka
- Wik'uña Kunka
- Wik'uña Utt'aña
- Yana Qucha

== Ethnic groups ==
The people in the district are mainly indigenous citizens of Quechua descent, although with a sizable percentage of mestizo and castizo population located mainly in the urban center.

Quechua is the language which the majority of the population (73.79%) learnt to speak in childhood, 25.86% of the residents started speaking using the Spanish language (2007 Peru Census).

== Climate ==
Climate data for Curahuasi, elevation 2,741 m (8,993 ft), (1991–2020)
Month	Jan	Feb	Mar	Apr	May	Jun	Jul	Aug	Sep	Oct	Nov	Dec	Year
Mean daily maximum °C (°F)	21.9 (71.4)	21.3 (70.3)	21.3 (70.3)	22.2 (72.0)	22.7 (72.9)	22.3 (72.1)	22.0 (71.6)	22.9 (73.2)	23.5 (74.3)	23.8 (74.8)	24.3 (75.7)	22.6 (72.7)	22.6 (72.6)
Mean daily minimum °C (°F)	11.0 (51.8)	11.0 (51.8)	11.2 (52.2)	10.3 (50.5)	8.8 (47.8)	7.5 (45.5)	7.0 (44.6)	7.6 (45.7)	8.9 (48.0)	9.9 (49.8)	10.3 (50.5)	10.7 (51.3)	9.5 (49.1)
Average precipitation mm (inches)	134.2 (5.28)	132.3 (5.21)	105.5 (4.15)	38.5 (1.52)	6.4 (0.25)	2.0 (0.08)	4.4 (0.17)	10.3 (0.41)	11.7 (0.46)	53.6 (2.11)	80.6 (3.17)	124.3 (4.89)	703.8 (27.7)
Source: National Meteorology and Hydrology Service of Peru

== See also ==
- Apurímac River
