= Magdalena del Mar District =

District in Lima, Peru

Magdalena del Mar
- District
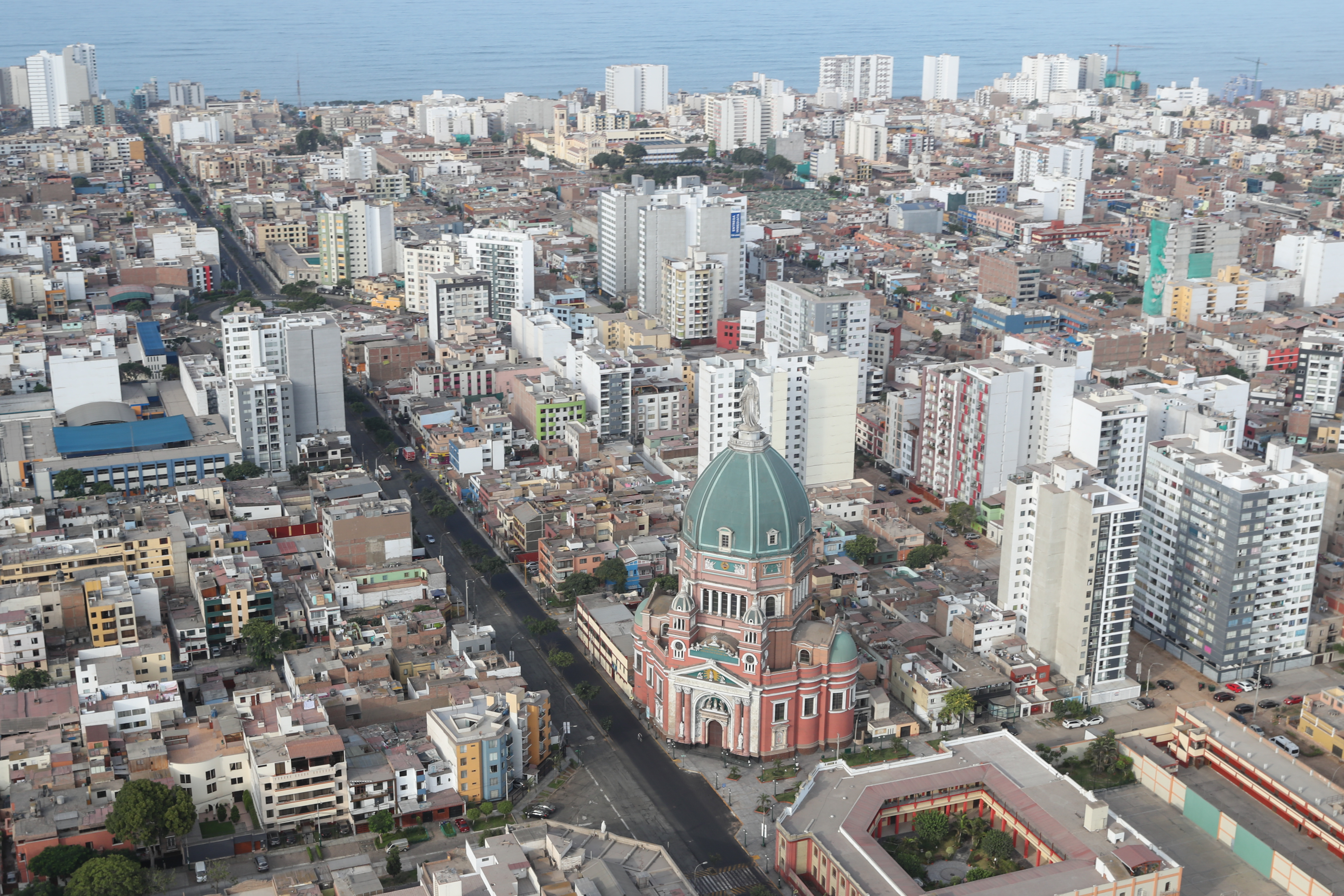
- Aerial view in 2020, the Church can be seen

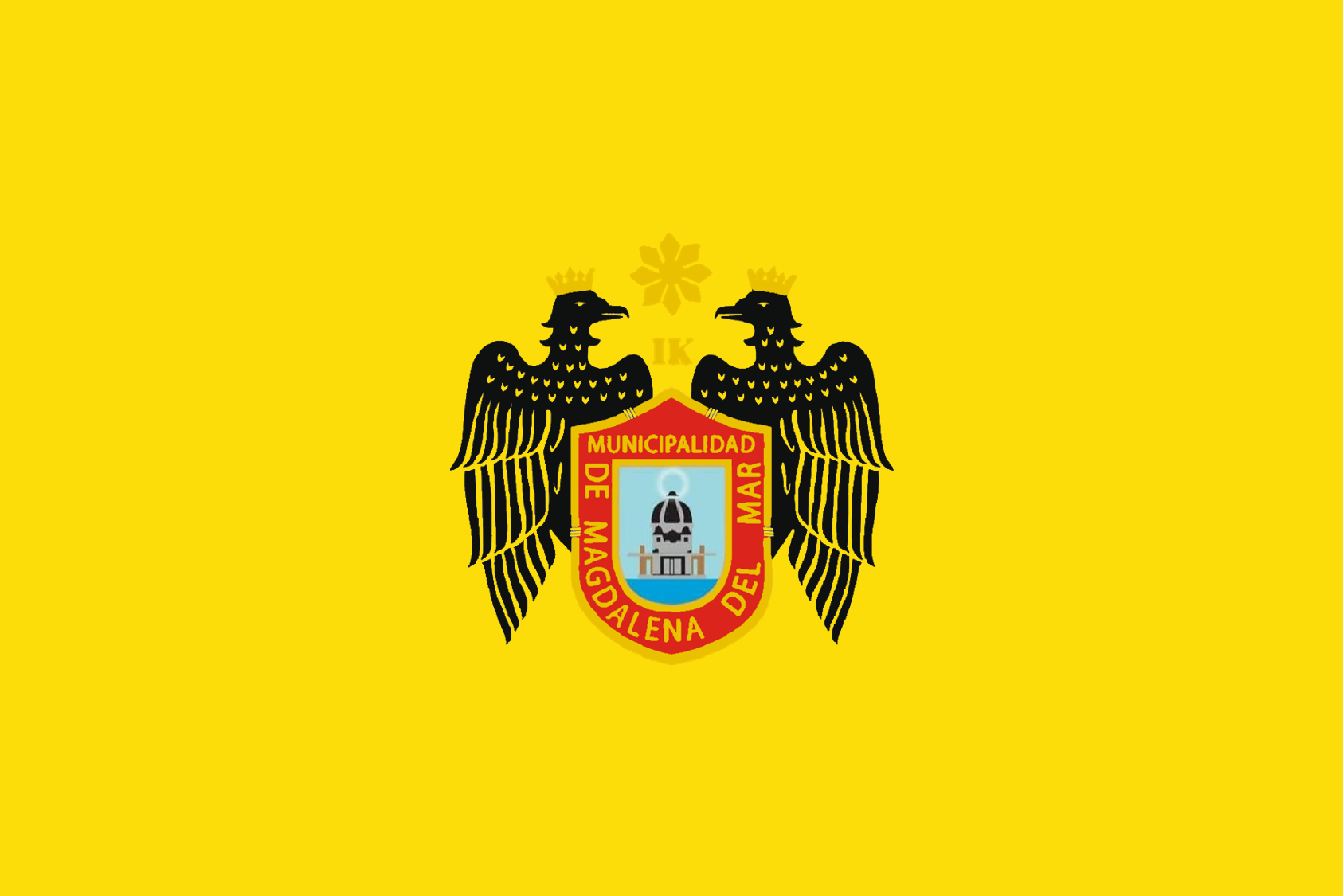
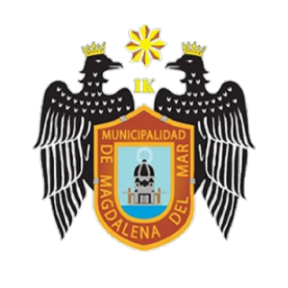
- Flag Coat of arms

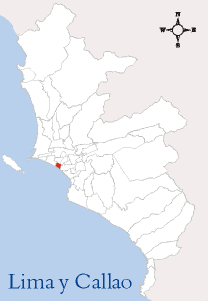
- Location of Magdalena del Mar in the Lima Province
- Coordinates: 12°06′S 77°05′W
- Country: Peru
- Region: Lima
- Province: Lima
- Founded: May 10, 1920
- Capital: Magdalena del Mar
- Subdivisions: 1 populated center

Government
  - Mayor: Francis Allison (APP) (2023-2026)

Area
  - Total: 3.61 km^{2} (1.39 sq mi)
- Elevation: 58 m (190 ft)

Population (2023)
  - Total: 69,488
  - Density: 19,200/km^{2} (49,900/sq mi)
- Time zone: UTC-5 (PET)
- UBIGEO: 150120
- Website: munimagdalena.gob.pe

Magdalena del Mar, also known simply as Magdalena, is a seaside district of Lima Province in Peru and one of the districts that comprise the city of Lima. Its current mayor is Francis Allison Oyague. Magdalena was officially established as a district on May 10, 1920.

== Geography ==
Magdalena del Mar has a total land area of 3.61 km^{2}. It is part of Lima's Cono Centro, an unofficial subregion of the city.

=== Boundaries ===
Magdalena borders the districts of San Miguel on the west, Pueblo Libre and Jesús María on the north, San Isidro on the east, and the Pacific Ocean on the south.

For more than fifty years, the eastern border of the district has been disputed with neighboring San Isidro. A judge ordered the councils of both districts to deposit the money of the affected areas' taxpayers in the National Bank of Peru until this long-standing conflict is resolved.

=== Climate ===
Climate data for Lima
Month	Jan	Feb	Mar	Apr	May	Jun	Jul	Aug	Sep	Oct	Nov	Dec	Year
Record high °F	79	79	79	75	72	68	66	64	66	68	72	75	72
Record high °C	26	26	26	24	22	20	19	18	19	20	22	24	22
Average precipitation days	1	1	0	0	1	2	3	3	3	2	2	0	16
Average rainy days	4	2	3	2	5	11	12	15	13	7	5	3	82
Average relative humidity (%)	85	80	80	85	85	85	85	85	85	85	85	85	84.2
Mean monthly sunshine hours	179.1	169	139.2	184	116.4	50.6	28.6	32.3	37.3	65.3	89	139.2	1,284
Source: Weatherbase (Temperature, precipitation and humidity). and Universidad Complutense de Madrid (Sunlight)

== Transportation ==
The main avenues that connect the district with the rest of the city are the Ejercito avenue, the Brasil avenue, the Javier Prado avenue, the Juan de Aliaga Avenue and the Sucre avenue.

There are many bus routes operated by private companies that go through the district, however, the main publicly owned bus lines are the 201, 202, 204 and 209 line from the Corredor Rojo.

== Demographics ==
According to a 2002 estimate by the INEI, the district has 52,976 inhabitants and a population density of 14,674.8 persons/km^{2}.

== See also ==
- Administrative divisions of Peru
