= Keith (surname) =

The surname Keith has several origins. In some cases it is derived from Keith in East Lothian, Scotland. In other cases the surname is originated from a nickname, derived from the Middle High German kīt, a word meaning "sprout", "offspring", which has roots in Samskrutham aka Sanskrit, which means field or farm.

== List of persons with the surname ==
=== A ===
- Aaron Keith (born 1971), American para-cyclist
- Andreas Keith (born 1967), German politician
- Arthur Berriedale Keith (1879–1944), Scottish constitutional lawyer and Sanskrit scholar
- Agnes Keith (disambiguation), several people
- Alan Keith (1908–2003), British radio presenter
- Alexander Keith (disambiguation), several people
- R. Alexandra Keith (born 1967/1968), American businesswoman
- Alice Keith (1890–1962), American music educator, radio professional
- Allison Keith (born 1974), American actor and voice actor
- Arthur Keith (1866–1955), Scottish anatomist and anthropologist
- Arthur Keith (geologist) (1864–1944), American geologist

=== B ===
- Ben Keith (fl. 1950-1960s), American musician
- Ben E. Keith, American businessman
- Benjamin Franklin Keith (1846–1914), American vaudeville theatre owner
- Bill Keith (disambiguation), several people
- Brandon Keith (born 1984), American football player
- Brian Keith (1921–1997), American actor

=== C ===
- Carl D. Keith (1920–2008), American chemist and inventor
- Charles A. Keith, American football, basketball and baseball coach
- Charles H. Keith, American music publisher
- Charles S. Keith (1873–1945), American businessman and politician
- Charlie Keith (1836–1895), British clown and circus manager
- Charlton Keith (born 1982), American football player
- Colt Keith (born 2001), American baseball player
- Craig Keith (born 1971), American football player

=== D ===
- Damon Keith (1922–2019), American jurist
- David Keith (born 1954), American actor and director
- Don Keith (born 1947), American writer
- Donald Keith (author), pseudonym of an American writing team, Donald and Keith Monroe
- Donald R. Keith (1927–2004), United States Army general
- Duncan Keith (born 1983), Canadian ice hockey player

=== E ===
- Eartha Kitt, born Eartha Keith (1927–2008), American singer and actress
- Eliza D. Keith (1854–1939), American educator, suffragist, journalist
- Elmer Keith (1899–1984), American firearm enthusiast
- Eoin Keith, Irish ultramarathon runner

=== F ===
- Farley Keith (born 1962), American music producer and disc jockey
- Francis Edward James Keith, Scottish military leader

=== G ===
- Geoff Keith (1937–1975), British cricketer
- George Keith (disambiguation), several people
- Gillian Keith (born 1972), Canadian musician
- Gordon Keith (radio host) (fl. 1990-2000s), American radio personality

=== H ===
- Hamish Keith (born 1936), New Zealand art scholar
- Harold Keith (1903–1998), American author
- Harry Keith (1899–1982), British forester and plant collector
- Hastings Keith (1915–2005), American politician
- Headley Keith (1927–1997), South African cricketer
- Henry Keith (disambiguation), several people

=== I ===
- Ian Keith (1899–1960), American actor
- Isabelle Keith (1898–1979), American film actress

=== J ===
- James Keith (disambiguation), several people
- Jeff Keith (born 1958), American musician
- Jennie Keith, American anthropologist
- Jeremy Keith (fl. 1990-2000s), British football club manager and owner
- Jim Keith (1949–1999), American author
- Joe Keith (born 1978), British footballer
- John Keith (disambiguation), several people

=== K ===
- Kenneth Keith (1937–2026), New Zealand jurist and legal scholar
- Kenneth Keith, Baron Keith of Castleacre, British businessman
- Kenton Keith (born 1980), Canadian football player
- Kenton Keith (diplomat) (fl. 1990s), American ambassador
- Kevin Keith (born 1963), American prisoner
- Kool Keith (fl. 1990–2000s), American hip hop artist

=== L ===
- Leslie Keith (1906–1977), American musician
- Lierre Keith (born 1964), American writer, radical feminist, food activist, and radical environmentalist
- Lisa Keith (fl. 1980-2000s), American musician

=== M ===
- Marino Keith (born 1974), Scottish footballer
- Marlise Keith (born 1972), South African artist
- Matt Keith (born 1983), Canadian ice hockey player
- Max Keith (1903–1974), German businessman with The Coca-Cola Company
- Miguel Keith (1951–1970), American Marine posthumously awarded the Medal of Honor
- Mike Keith (disambiguation), several people
- Minor C. Keith (1848–1929), American shipping and railroad businessman

=== N ===
- Nathaniel S. Keith (1838–1925), American engineer and scientist

=== P ===
- Penelope Keith (1940–2026), British actress

=== R ===
- Richard Keith (disambiguation), several people
- Robert Keith (disambiguation), several people
- Rodd Keith (1937–1974), American musician and songwriter

=== S ===
- Sam Keith (1921–2003), American author
- Sandra Keith (born 1980), Canadian Olympics athlete
- Shannon Keith (fl. 1990-2000s), American animal rights activist
- Sheila Keith (1920–2004), British television and film actress
- Sheridan Keith (born 1942), New Zealand author, artist, broadcaster and curator
- Slim Keith (1917–1990), American socialite and fashion icon
- Stuart Keith (1931–2003), British ornithologist

=== T ===
- Terry Keith (fl. 1980s-90s), American geologist
- Timothy Z. Keith (fl. 1970-2000s), American psychologist
- Toby Keith (1961–2024), American country singer, songwriter, actor, and record producer.
- Tom Keith (1946–2011), American radio engineer and radio personality
- Trever Keith (born 1969), American musician and music producer

=== V ===
- Vicki Keith (born 1961), Canadian swimmer

=== W ===
- Warren Keith (fl. 1990-2000s), American film actor
- Willard Keith (1920–1942), World War II United States Marine Corps captain
- William Keith (disambiguation), several people

=== Z ===
- Zak Keith (fl. 1990-2000s), British-born Swedish musician

== See also ==
- Justice Keith (disambiguation)
- Baron Keith, a line of Scottish barons in the late 18th century
- Clan Keith, Scottish clan associated with lands in northeastern and northwestern Scotland
- Sam Kieth (born 1963), American comics writer and illustrator and film director
- McKeith
