= Charles Keith =

Charles Keith may refer to:

- Charles H. Keith, American music publisher in the 19th century
- Charles A. Keith (1883–1960), American football, basketball and baseball coach
- Charles S. Keith (1873–1945), American coal and lumber businessman, mayor of Kansas City
- Charlie Keith (1836–1895), British clown and circus manager

== See also ==
- Charles & Keith, a Singaporean footwear and accessories retailer
- Keith Charles (disambiguation)
