= Keith Williams =

Keith Williams may refer to:

== Sports ==
=== American football ===
- Keith Williams (American football coach) (born 1971), American football coach
- Keith Williams (bodybuilder) (born 1973), and former American footballer
- Keith Williams (cornerback) (born 1983), Canadian football cornerback
- Keith Williams (offensive lineman) (born 1988), Pittsburgh Steelers football player

=== Association football ===
- Keith Williams (Australian footballer) (1926–2004), Fitzroy VFL footballer
- Keith Williams (footballer, born 1937), footballer for Everton, Tranmere Rovers, Plymouth Argyle and Bristol Rovers
- Keith Williams (footballer, born 1957), footballer for Aston Villa, Northampton Town and Bournemouth

=== Baseball ===
- Keith Williams (baseball) (born 1972), San Francisco Giants baseball player

=== Basketball ===
- Keith Williams (basketball, born 1965), American basketball player
- Keith Williams (basketball, born 1998), American basketball player

== Others ==
- Keith Williams (architect) (born 1958), British architect
- Keith Williams (businessman) (born 1956), British businessman
- Keith Williams (comics) (born 1957), American comic book and comic strip artist
- Keith Daniel Williams (1947–1996), American triple murderer
- Keith David (Keith David Williams, born 1956), American actor
- Keith L. Williams, (born 2007), American actor
- Keith P. Williams, American politician, member of the North Carolina General Assembly
- Keith Williams (developer) (1929–2011), Australian entrepreneur
- Keith Williams, Jamaican reggae singer better known as Honey Boy
- Keith Williams, character in Ambush at Cimarron Pass
- Keith Williams, winner of 2003 Jeopardy! College Championship and creator of The Final Wager

== See also ==
- William Keith (disambiguation)
- Williams (disambiguation)
- Keith (disambiguation)
