= Philip Gounis =

American writer (born 1948)

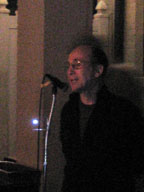
Philip Gounis

Philip John Gounis (born February 1, 1948, Richmond Heights, Missouri) is an American poet, literary journalist, archivist, filmmaker, publisher, concert, and book reviewer.

Gounis first came into public awareness in the early 1970s when he and several colleagues filmed and presented a series of experimental films. These films were the product of the informal largess of the University of Missouri - St. Louis. During this period Gounis also began to publish his poetry in several alternative press outlets and read on KDNA FM radio. Some of the participants in these readings later formed the nucleus of River Styx Magazine.

In March 1976, he initiated a weekly blues program on KCLC radio at Lindenwood College in St. Charles, Missouri. "Crackerbox" featured recorded blues music spanning five decades and sometimes hosted guests such as Grammy winner Corky Siegel, Linda LaFlamme (It's a Beautiful Day), boogie- woogie virtuoso Rudy “Silver Cloud” Coleman, blues master Bob Case, and others. In June 1976 he began to host and produce “Verbatim”, a monthly showcase of poetry and music. Poets Donald Finkel, Jan Garden Castro, Carter Revard and Michael Castro were some of the poets featured.

In the early 1980s Gounis contributed to the work of the Soulard Culture Squad. This group of poets and musicians performed throughout the historic Soulard area and published several poetry collections.

In 1988, he co-founded a magazine of politics and popular culture, Steamshovel Press with the impetus of publishing an interview with Ram Dass. At the end of the decade and into the ’90s he took part in radio programs such as Off The Beaten Path, Poetry Beat and Literature for the Halibut on KDHX FM in St. Louis, Missouri. Some of the transcripts of his interviews done in conjunction with these programs are available at the Washington University in St. Louis Department of Special Collections Olin Library. In summer 2005 Intangible Studios released the CD, Form Matters on which Gounis collaborated with musician Rich Kruse. Some Of These Have Appeared, a chapbook of poetry was published spring 2007. In the summer of 2010 Gounis' work appeared in Flood Stage: An Anthology of Saint Louis Poets. His second chapbook, Upgrading the Allusion was published by JK Publishing in April, 2011.

== Sources ==
- Fat Chance - Double Helix media guide, August 1972
- KCLC Lindenwood College Radio Guide March, 1976
- Living Blues magazine issues #36,41 1978
- River Styx magazine Index & Retrospective
- River Styx issues # 4, 33,34,38
- Soulard Culture Squad Review 1986
- Steamshovel Press issues #1-4
- Airwaves KDHX Fall. 1997
- CD Baby Catalogue 2005
- Flood Stage (Walrus Press, 2010) ISBN 978-0-9844857-3-4
- Upgrading the Allusion (JK Publishing, 2011) ISBN 978-0-9841180-4-5
