= In Secret Tibet =

1937 book by Theodore Illion

- Editors: Theodore Illion
- Language: English
- Subject: Travel
- Genre: Nonfiction
- Published: 1937
- Publisher: Eastern School Press
- Publication place: United States
- Media type: Paperback

In Secret Tibet (In disguise amongst lamas, robbers, and wise men) is a travel book by author Theodore Illion, first published in German in 1936 and then in English in 1937.

== Fantastic tales ==
In 1934, the author set out to explore Tibet, dyeing his face with iodine and oil to avoid detection in a country that was closed to foreigners at the time. Theodore Illion wrote three books about the country, Darkness over Tibet was also published in 1937 and The Tibetan Art of Healing came out in 1975. In Secret Tibet primarily focuses on the Tibetan people and their thoughts and customs; Illion enthusiastically relates tales of his encounters with nomads, bandits, lamas, and other holy men.

Perhaps the most incredible chapter relays an encounter where Illion observed a miraculous healer help a traveling passerby who had been struck by a falling stone which:

"..tore savagely down his right arm.. tearing away the skin and inflicting a deep flesh wound at least twenty inches in length.

I am unable to say whether [the healer] actually touched the bleeding wound or whether his hand passed over it about an inch from it. Be that as it may, the bleeding stopped instantly."

One remarkable account given in the book is the author's witnessing of a practitioner of lung-gom-pa. These "flying lamas" were supposedly capable of running with a sustained bouncing motion for several days and nights on end. They had previously been witnessed by Alexandra David-Néel, a French explorer visiting the country in 1924. Illion says that he twice observed the lung-gom-pa at close range, describing how:

"..the hands and feet of the lama swung to and fro like a pendulum. The speed at which they progressed was amazing.. ..he was in a state of trance.. ..judging by careful examination of his footprints, the weight of his body must have been diminished to some extent."

== Controversy ==
Much of the text appears to mirror the work of Alexandra David-Néel, overlaid with Illion's personal musings and fantastic tales. This is a quote from David-Néel's Magic and Mystery in Tibet, (published five years previously) which recounts an earlier meeting she had with a lung-gom-pa lama:

"He seemed to lift himself from the ground.. His steps had the regularity of a pendulum.. ..the traveller seemed to be in a trance." These men they say, are able to sit on an ear of barley without bending its stalk, or to stand on the top of a heap of grain without displacing any of it. ..but I have not myself witnessed anything like it."

Physician and bibliographer Jürgen C. Aschoff highly doubts Theodore Illion ever went to Tibet, or even approached the borders. Illion's books are, in his eyes, "truly science fiction, a figment of the imagination." Aschoff finds it incredible that Illion's publications are used and cited in many scientific articles and books on Tibetan medicine, although [Illion] has "never mentioned one published reference or one renowned Tibetan physician in support of his vague assertions."

== Bibliography ==
Notes

References

- David-Neel, Alexandra (1932). Magic And Mystery In Tibet (1932 ed.). Kessinger Publishing. ISBN 9781417977543. - Total pages: 348
- Illion, Theodore (1991). In Secret Tibet (1991 ed.). Adventures Unlimited Press. ISBN 9780932813138. - Total pages: 210
- Illion, Theodore (1974). The Tibetan Art of Healing (1974 ed.). Adventures Unlimited Press. ISBN 9780722401347. - Total pages: 117
