= Stefan Larsson =

Stefan Larsson is the name of:

- Stefan Larsson (businessman) (born 1974), American fashion industry executive
- Stefan Larsson (footballer) (born 1983), Swedish retired footballer
- Stefan Larsson (ice hockey) (born 1965), Swedish retired ice hockey player
