= Marlise =

Marlise is a given name. Notable people with the name include:

- Marlise Keith (born 1972), South African artist
- Marlise Simons, Dutch-born American journalist
- Marlise Wendels (1923–2012), German operatic soprano
