= Steamshovel Press =

Steamshovel Press is a zine devoted to conspiracy theories and parapolitics. The magazine was started in 1992 and ran 23 issues. It was founded and previously published by Kenn Thomas. The magazine was named after one of Bob Dylan's song "From A Buick Six" from Highway 61 Revisited. The headquarters is in St. Louis.

== Featured authors ==
- Andrew A. Skolnick
- David Black
- Len Bracken
- Alexandra Bruce
- David Childress
- Philip Gounis
- Jim Keith
- Greg Krupey, "The High & the Mighty" (Steamshovel Press #10)
- Joel Levy
- Jim Martin, "Quigley, Clinton, Straight, and Reich" (Steamshovel Press #8, Summer 1993)
- Olav Phillips
- Robert Sterling (Editor of Konformist.com, not the actor)
