= Gemstone File =

Conspiracy theory

The Gemstone File is a conspiratorial document attributed to Bruce Porter Roberts. In 1975, "A Skeleton Key to the Gemstone File" appeared and is generally attributed to Stephanie Caruana. The "Key" is purportedly a synopsis of Roberts' documents that presents a chronicle of interlocking conspiracies, including claims that world events since the 1950s were shaped by suppressed information, the names of supposed shooters of President John F. Kennedy, and suggested connections between a number of political assassinations which occurred within a relatively short time frame. Authors James McConnachie and Robin Tudge called it "the original mega-conspiracy theory."

== History ==
Originally distributed in 1975 by hand and mail in photocopy form, the Gemstone File has appeared in slightly revised form in Hustler magazine and on the Internet. Roberts, known only to Stephanie Caruana and conspiracy theorist Mae Brussell, purportedly began gathering information in the file when Howard Hughes stole his invention for processing synthetic rubies, hence the title "Gemstone". According to Gerald Carroll, Roberts was born in New York State on October 27, 1919, and died of lung cancer in San Francisco on July 16, 1976.

Factsheet Five publisher Mike Gunderloy collected and distributed several versions of the Gemstone File. Gunderloy wrote that the original Gemstone File was simply a list of contributors to Committee to Re-elect the President (CREEP), while the subsequent versions gradually linked various figures of the Watergate and Kennedy eras.

== Outline ==
The Gemstone File proposes that Aristotle Onassis, Joseph P. Kennedy, and other prominent figures were involved in various schemes to forward a vast global conspiracy, involving the Mafia and corrupt politicians, brutal oil and drug cartels, rogue military operations, and more. It also posits that early in 1957, Aristotle Onassis had Howard Hughes kidnapped from his Beverly Hills Hotel bungalow, that Hughes suffered a massive brain injury during the forcible kidnapping, and that Hughes was subsequently a virtual prisoner of Onassis on Skorpios and injected regularly with morphine, while Onassis took over the operation of Hughes's considerable financial affairs, including airlines and U.S. defense contracting.

The Gemstone File portrays Onassis as the main force behind the election of John F. Kennedy as president and, subsequently, Kennedy's assassination in 1963. According to the documents, Lee Harvey Oswald was a patsy in the JFK assassination plan and was linked to the Central Intelligence Agency, and to Mafia connections in New Orleans, with Jimmy Fratianno, Johnny Roselli, and Eugene Brading as the real shooters. The Gemstone papers claim that John F. Kennedy, Robert F. Kennedy and Joseph P. Kennedy were involved with the Mafia and Onassis, and when the Kennedy brothers attempted to break away, they were murdered.

== Books ==
- The Gemstone File, Jim Keith, ed. (1992, IllumiNet Press. 214 pages) Includes the Skeleton Key; an interview with Stephanie Caruana; excerpts from Mae Brussell's 2 1977-8 KLRB radio broadcasts on the Skeleton Key and Bruce Roberts' Gemstone File; Kiwi Gemstone; and articles by Jonathan Vankin, Robert Anton Wilson, Kerry Wendell Thornley, Ben G. Price and others. OOP.
- Project Seek by Gerald A. Carroll (1994, Bridger House. 388 pages.) Extended documentation of Skeleton Key. Includes Kiwi Gemstone, discussion on Robert F. Kennedy and Martin Luther King, Jr., assassinations; interviews with an employee of Hughes, etc.
- Inside the Gemstone File by Kenn Thomas (Steam Shovel Press) and David Hatcher Childress (1999, Adventures Unlimited Press, 250 pages) Explores connections between Ian Fleming's "James Bond" novels and movies and the Skeleton Key. Includes Kiwi Gemstone, account of Danny Casolaro's mysterious death, Com-12 Briefing Documents, Interview with Stephanie Caruanaa, etc.
- The Gemstone File: A Memoir by Stephanie Caruana (2006, Trafford Press, 480 pages) Contains an updated, expanded Skeleton Key, 2 related articles by Stephanie Caruana and Mae Brussell, and 220 edited pages from Bruce Roberts' original handwritten Gemstone File letters; the Kiwi Gemstone, and other items.

== In fiction ==
In the television series La Femme Nikita, the Gemstone File documents the plans for world domination of Operations (also known as Paul Wolfe), the leading operative of Section 1, which involve the support of Saddam Hussein, a pawn in Operations' schemes. The former head of Section 1, Adrian, plans of revealing the Gemstone File first to George, head of Oversight, and then to the public in order to shatter Operations's bid for power, though Nikita ends up siding with Operations, as simulations predict world chaos and destruction should Hussein be removed from power.
