= Keith Prowse =

Ex music industry conglomerate now leisure holding company

The Keith Prowse company originated from a partnership in 1830 between two musical instrument makers who opened a shop selling their goods. It later became a theatre ticket agency and music publisher; after a merger with the Peter Maurice company it became KPM and was acquired by EMI in 1969.

Keith Prowse remains as a trading name used by two separate companies. Within the United Kingdom it is used by the Sport, Leisure and Hospitality Division of Compass Group Plc (who provide catering facilities). The company operates at numerous venues for major sporting and cultural events including Cirque du Soleil, Chelsea Flower Show, Wimbledon and test cricket.

== History ==
Robert William Keith (1767–1846), a musical composer, instrument maker and organist at the New Jerusalem Church, Friars Street, London, opened a shop in London in the late 18th century. In 1830 he entered a partnership with another musical instrument manufacturer and music publisher, William Prowse (1801–1886), to form Keith, Prowse & Co.

The company entered the theatre ticketing business after acquiring "Theater Ticket Messengers" a company which used young message boys to go to theatres and either hold seats or collect seat tokens for favoured clients. The first reference to the firm's selling theatre tickets appeared in an article published in 1886 in the Morning Chronicle, referring to "The New System of Ticket Agents". One of the first ticketing companies to have a telephone installed, Keith Prowse appeared in the first UK telephone directory published in 1880. In 1886, the company first represented Royal Ascot, opened the World's first flight ticket booking office at Brooklands near Weybridge, Surrey, in 1911 and soon opened another at London Aerodrome. In 1924, they first represented the Wimbledon Championships.

In 1954, Peter Cadbury borrowed £75000 from his father to buy the Keith Prowse ticket agency, which went public in 1960, and later became a subsidiary of Westward Television. In 1955, to focus the business on the ticket agency, Keith Prowse Music Publishing was spun off and sold to the holders of the original London weekdays commercial television franchise, Associated-Rediffusion. In 1959, Associated-Rediffusion purchased the successful Peter Maurice publishing company and merged it with Keith Prowse Music Publishing to form KPM – Keith-Prowse-Maurice (often referred to incorrectly as “Keith Prowse Music”). In 1969, EMI bought Keith-Prowse-Maurice and Central Songs. KPM Music Recorded Library released many recordings of library music by composers such as Alan Hawkshaw. Today, KPM is owned by Sony Music Publishing which acquired EMI Music Publishing in 2012.

In 1981, the Keith Prowse agency opened its first office outside the UK in New York City and a further office was established in Dublin in 1982. In the same year, the company was officially appointed by the All England Lawn Tennis and Croquet Club through its purchase of Ashton & Mitchell which held royal appointment and rights to Wimbledon tennis.

== Administration, internal and external sale ==
The company saw a period of external administration in 1991 with debts of £7m ($12m), prompting its purchase by Wembley plc (former owner of Wembley Stadium) which in March 2002 sold Keith Prowse Ltd to the company's management for £5.5m ($7.8m/EUR8.9m).

In 2004 the business split:

- Compass Group Plc acquired the Keith Prowse corporate hospitality business sectors for £20m.
- The remaining business of selling tickets to theatres, tours and attractions became operated by Keith Prowse Travel
