= Hillion (surname) =

History of the family name Hillion

Hillion is a Breton surname most commonly found in Côtes-d'Armor, Brittany, France.

The surname exists in other forms such as: Hilion, Illion, Helion, Helyon. The name has also existed in the form of De Hillion or De Helion in Côtes-d'Armor and Devon.

== Origin ==
The name is believed to have been introduced by Celtic Britons settling in the current area of the city of Hillion around the 6th century.

The name has been suggested to mean "the descendants", "those of the same race" (in the sense of ethnic group), and used as a marker of the territory by the first migrants. Alternatively, it has been suggested that the name originate from "ill" which frequently was used by the Gauls or the Celtes as names to areas connected with water.

== Hillion of Côtes-d'armor ==
Noble individuals in Côtes-d'Armor have historically carried the name in the form of both Hillion and De Hillion with a high concentration in the area of Saint-Brieuc.

It is believed that members of the family gradually lost their status as estates were divided up amongst numerous heirs over the generations. There is also evidence that some bearers of the name lost their titles at the end of the 17th century as a means to remove tax liability for the ever growing class of tax-exempted nobles.

== Hillion of Devon ==
The noble family De Helion/De Hillion established itself in Devon after the Norman conquest of England as evidenced by the Domesday book. Hervé De Helion and Tihel De Helion are believed to have originated from the area of Hillion, arriving with the Norman forces at the Battle of Hastings in 1066.

Hervé de Helion was granted land titles in Hackworthy, Ashton and Neadon. The village of Upton-Hellions is believed to have inherited its name from De Helion.

In the case of Hervé de Helion, the family surname name was later written in the form of Hillion. The original Breton name for the city of Hillion is Helion and it is therefore possible that the current city of Hillion has inherited this anglicized variation of the surname.

== Notable people with the surname ==
- Constant-Mathurin Hillion (1830–1890), French clergyman
- Hélène Hillion-Guillemin (born 1969), French footballer
- Jean Hélion (1904–1987), French painter
- Theodore Illion (1898–1984), Canadian-born travel writer
