= Colonial House =

Colonial House may refer to:

- Colonial House (TV series)
- Colonial House, North Shields, a seamen's hostel in Tyne and Wear, England
- American colonial architecture
- McIntyre House (Salt Lake City)
