= Colonial House, North Shields =

Colonial House, North Shields was a seamen's hostel catering for non-white seamen from the colonies of the British Empire, located at 3 Northumberland Place, North Shields. It was one of a series of buildings called "Colonial House" or "West Indies House" located in Liverpool, London, Newcastle-on-Tyne and Bolton as well as Aggrey House, London, Hull Sailor’s Home, Students’ International Club, Glasgow, West and Africa House, London. During the Second World War, John Lucien Keith, a Colonial Office Welfare Officer considered billeting African-American soldiers in these facilities.
