= John Keith =

John Keith may refer to:

- John Keith, 1st Earl of Kintore (died 1715), Scottish nobleman
- John Keith (defensive back) (born 1977), player in the National Football League
- John A. H. Keith (1869–1931), American educator, college football and basketball coach
- John M. Keith, mayor of Missoula, Montana
- John Lucien Keith, British colonial official and civil servant
- J. Andrew Keith (1958–1999), American author and games developer
