= Kenn Thomas =

American conspiracy theorist (1958–2023)

Kenn Thomas (June 12, 1958 – September 22, 2023) was a conspiracy writer, archivist, and editor and publisher of Steamshovel Press, a parapolitical conspiracy magazine.

Thomas, who was born in St. Louis, Missouri, wrote over a dozen books on various conspiracy topics. These included NASA, Nazis & JFK; Maury Island UFO, about the possibility that Fred Crisman was connected to the assassination of John F. Kennedy; and The Octopus: Secret Government and the Death of Danny Casolaro, about the Inslaw affair. In 2004, Feral House published a new edition of The Octopus, extending the suggestion of connections to the post-September 11 attacks world and al-Qaeda. Feral House published a new edition of Maury Island UFO in 2011 as JFK & UFO: Military-Industrial Conspiracy and Cover-Up from Maury Island to Dallas.

Thomas called his research interest "parapolitics", the study of conspiracies of all colors—from alien abductions and the Illuminati, to the John F. Kennedy assassination and the September 11, 2001 attacks. The New Yorker called his work "on the cutting edge" of conspiracy. His name became a by-word for a conspiracy theorist, enough so that baseball was described in print as involving "enough fishy behavior to keep Kenn Thomas swarming for years."

Thomas appeared at Conspiracy Con in 2003 and 2007.

== Bibliography ==
- Acid: A New Secret History of LSD, David Black (introduction by Kenn Thomas), Vision, UK, 2003, paperback, ISBN 1-901250-30-X
- The Arch Conspirator, Len Bracken (introduction by Kenn Thomas), AUP, US, 1999, paperback, ISBN 0-932813-72-0
- The Christ Conspiracy: The Greatest Story Ever Sold, Acharya S (introduction by Kenn Thomas), AUP, US, 1999, paperback, ISBN 0-932813-74-7
- Cyberculture Counterconspiracy: A Steamshovel Web Reader, Book Tree, US, 2000, ISBN 1-58509-126-X (2 volumes)
- Inside the Gemstone File, Kenn Thomas and David Childress, AUP, US, 1999, ISBN 0-932813-66-6
- The Little Book of Conspiracies: A Paranoiac's Pocket Guide, Joel Levy (introduction by Kenn Thomas), Thunder's Mouth, US, 2005, paperback, ISBN 1-56025-723-7
- Maury Island UFO: The Crisman Conspiracy, IllumiNet, US, 1999, paperback ISBN 1-881532-19-4
- Mind Control, Oswald & JFK, AUP, US, 1997, paperback ISBN 0-932813-46-1
- NASA, Nazis & JFK: The Torbitt Document & the Kennedy Assassination, Adventures Unlimited Press, US, 1996 paperback, ISBN 0-932813-39-9
- The Octopus: Secret Government and the Death of Danny Casolaro, with Jim Keith, Feral House, US, 2005, paperback, ISBN 0-922915-91-1
- Parapolitics: Conspiracy in Contemporary America, AUP, US, 2006, paperback, ISBN 1-931882-55-X
- Popular Alienation: A Steamshovel Press Reader, IllumiNet, US, 1995, paperback, ISBN 1-881532-07-0
- Popular Paranoia: A Steamshovel Press Anthology, AUP, US, November 2002, paperback, ISBN 1-931882-06-1
- Saucers of the Illuminati, Jim Keith (introduction by Kenn Thomas), AUP, US, 2004, paperback, ISBN 1-931882-24-X
- Secret and Suppressed II: Banned Ideas and Hidden History into the 21st Century Feral House, US Oct. 2008, paperback
- Shadow Government: 9/11 and State Terror, Len Bracken (introduction by Kenn Thomas), AUP, US, 2002, paperback, ISBN 1-931882-05-3
- William Cooper: Death Of A Conspiracy Salesman, various with contribution from Kenn Thomas, Inner Light, US, 2001, paperback, ISBN 1-892062-30-5
