= Bill Keith =

Bill Keith may refer to:

- Bill Keith (artist) (1929–2004), painter, photographer and visual poet
- Bill Keith (musician) (1939–2015), banjo player and innovator of the "melodic style" of banjo playing

== See also ==
- William Keith (disambiguation)
- Keith (disambiguation)
- Bill (disambiguation)
