= McKeith =

McKeith is a surname. Notable people with this surname include:

- Derek McKeith, American singer, songwriter and music producer
- Gillian McKeith (born 1959), Scottish television personality and writer
- Ian G. McKeith, British psychiatrist

== See also ==
- Keith (surname)
