= R. Alexandra Keith =

American businesswoman (born 1968)

R. Alexandra (Alex) Keith
- Born: 1968 (age 57–58)
- Education: University of Arizona
- Occupation: Businesswoman
- Title: CEO of global beauty division, Procter & Gamble
- Term: July 2019-
- Predecessor: Patrice Louvet

R. Alexandra (Alex) Keith (born 1968) is an American businesswoman, and CEO of Procter & Gamble's global beauty division.

== Early life ==
Keith earned a bachelor's degree in chemical engineering from the University of Arizona in 1989.

== Career ==
Keith joined P&G in 1989. She spent her first seven years in manufacturing and logistics, before moving into marketing.

From 2010 to 2014, Keith worked in the fabric care division of P&G. Then, from 2014 to 2017, Keith was head of the skin and personal care division.

Keith became president of Procter & Gamble's $11.4 billion global beauty business in July 2017, when she succeeded Patrice Louvet. In November 2018, she was promoted to CEO of P&G's global beauty division, effective July 2019.

For five consecutive years, Keith has been named to Fortune's international list of most powerful women in business, first entering the roster at #26 in 2017.

=== COVID graduations ===
In May 2020, Keith joined other business people and celebrities for a virtual commencement event hosted by Her Campus in lieu of in-person graduation ceremonies cancelled due to COVID-19 concerns.

=== Affiliations ===
As of June 2021, Keith is on the boards of Thermo Fisher Scientific, Cosmetic Executive Women (CEW) and Personal Care Products Council.
