= KPM Music =

British library music producer

- Formerly: KPM Musichouse (1955–2011); EMI Production Music (2011–2021)
- Type: Subsidiary
- Industry: Music
- Founded: May 2, 1955; 71 years ago
- Headquarters: United Kingdom
- Services: Library music
- Parent: Sony Music Publishing

KPM Music (originally known as KPM Musichouse) is a company that creates and provides library music. It was formed by the merger of KPM (the initials of Keith-Prowse-Maurice, which was then a division of EMI) and Music House (a company that EMI acquired in 1997).

== History ==
The firm's origins date back to the Keith, Prowse & Co. partnership established in 1830. KPM's music library has been utilised in many films and television programmes and in radio and television commercials worldwide. The KPM 1000 album series, mainly produced by Adrian Kerridge, has become more commercially available in recent years.

The music written by KPM's composers was intended for use as signature tunes or incidental music in film and television. KPM pieces were featured prominently in Mastermind, All Creatures Great and Small, The Avengers, The Benny Hill Show, Animal Magic, This Is Your Life, Dave Allen at Large, SpongeBob SquarePants, The Ren & Stimpy Show, Camp Lazlo, ZZZap!, Superstars, Grandstand, Rugby Special, and ITV News at Ten. In the U.S. the recordings have been used on Sesame Street, as well as sports documentarian Jon Bois' YouTube series, including Dorktown.

In the United States, KPM is represented by APM Music.

KPM Musichouse was rebranded as EMI Production Music in 2011 and is now part of Sony Music Publishing. In January 2019, KPM's production library was fully digitized and became available for streaming online.

EMI Production Music was rebranded again to KPM Music on 13 September 2021.
