= Robert Keith =

Robert Keith may refer to:

- Robert Keith (actor) (1898–1966), American actor
- Robert Keith (historian) (1681–1757), Scottish Episcopal bishop and historian
- Robert II Keith, Marischal of Scotland (died 1332), who fought at the Battle of Bannockburn
- Robert III Keith, Marischal of Scotland (died 1346), Scottish nobleman
- Robert Murray Keith (died 1774), British diplomat
- Robert Murray Keith (the younger) (1730–1795), his son, British soldier, diplomat and politician
- Robert William Keith (1787–1846), English musical composer and writer
- Robert Alba Keith, better known as Brian Keith
- Robert J. Keith, company vice-president and writer on the history of marketing
