= Lung-gom-pa =

Esoteric skill in Tibetan Buddhism

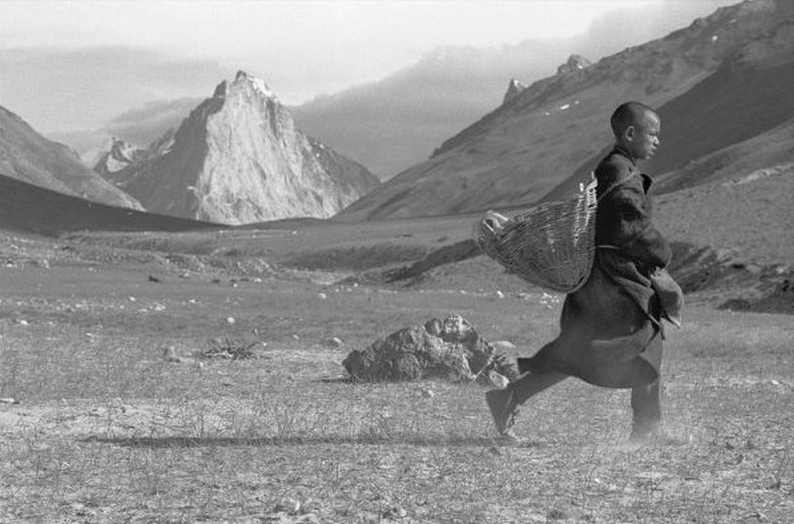
Lunggompa adept on his way through the Himalayas

Lung-gom-pa is esoteric skill in Tibetan Buddhism, which is said to allow a practitioner to run at an extraordinary speed for days without stopping. This technique could be compared to that practised by the Kaihōgyō monks of Mount Hiei and by practitioners of Shugendō, Japan.

Alexandra David-Néel, in her book Magic and Mystery in Tibet, describes how she saw a lung-gum-pa runner in action. After witnessing such a monk David-Néel described how "[h]e seemed to lift himself from the ground. His steps had the regularity of a pendulum [...] the traveller seemed to be in a trance.

According to Alexandra David-Néel, Milarepa boasted of having "crossed in a few days, a distance which, before his training in magic, had taken him more than a month. He ascribes his gift to the clever control of 'internal air'." David-Néel comments "that at the house of the lama who taught him black magic there lived a trapa [monk] who was fleeter than a horse" using the same skill.

== See also ==
- In Secret Tibet
