= William Keith =

William Keith may refer to:

== Law and politics ==
- William John Keith (1873–1937), British colonial administrator
- William Keith (Canadian politician) (fl. 1920s), Canadian politician in Ontario
- William R. Keith (1929–2009), American businessman and politician in Michigan
- William Keith (Louisiana politician) (born 1934), American politician in Louisiana

== Nobility ==
- William Keith, 1st Earl Marischal (died 1483), Scottish peer and politician
- William Keith, 4th Earl Marischal (died 1581), Scottish nobleman and politician
- William Keith, 6th Earl Marischal (c. 1585–1635), Scottish peer and naval officer
- William Keith, 7th Earl Marischal (1610–1670/71), Scottish Covenanter
- William Keith, 9th Earl Marischal (c. 1664–1712), Scottish Jacobite politician
- Sir William Keith, 4th Baronet (1669–1749), Lt. Governor of Pennsylvania and Delaware
- William Keith, 2nd Earl of Kintore (1695–1718), Scottish nobleman

== Others ==
- William Keith of Galston (died 1336), Scottish soldier
- William Keith of Delny (died c. 1605), Scottish courtier
- William Keith (artist) (1838–1911), American landscape artist
- William Keith (footballer) (fl. 1913–1916), Scottish footballer
- William Keith (athlete) (1925–1999), South African Olympic runner
- William H. Keith Jr. (born 1950), American science fiction author

== See also ==
- Bill Keith (disambiguation)
- Keith Williams (disambiguation)
