= James Keith =

James Keith may refer to:

- James Francis Edward Keith (1696–1758), Scottish soldier and Prussian field marshal
- James Keith, Baron Keith of Avonholm (1886–1964), Scottish Senator of the College of Justice, and law lord
- James Keith (Virginia judge) (1839–1918), president of the state of Virginia's Supreme Court of Appeals from 1895 to 1916
- Reverend James Keith, Massachusetts colonial minister who served from 1664 to 1719 at what is now called Reverend James Keith Parsonage
- Jim Keith (1949–1999), American author
