= Keith Alexander =

Keith Alexander may refer to:

- Keith Alexander (footballer) (1956–2010), former English footballer and football manager
- Keith B. Alexander (born 1951), retired U.S. Army general and former head of the National Security Agency
- Keith Alexander (Manitoba politician) (1921–1972), Progressive Conservative politician in Manitoba, Canada
- Keith Alexander (guitarist) (1963–2005), former guitarist of 1980s thrash band Carnivore
- Keith Alexander (actor) (fl. 1966), British actor and voice actor
- Keith Alexander (engineer), New Zealand inventor and professor of mechanical engineering at the University of Canterbury
- Keith Alexander, a co-host of The Political Cesspool

== See also ==
- Alexander Keith (disambiguation)
