= Theodore Illion =

Canadian travel book writer (1898–1984)

Theodore Illion or Theodor Illion (1898 in Canada (?) – September 4, 1984 in Hallein in the state of Salzburg), is a writer of travel books who claimed to have visited Tibet in the 1930s and discovered an underground city there. He published his Tibetan adventures under that name but later resorted to the pseudonyms Theodore Burang or Theodor Burang and more rarely Theodor Nolling to write various books and articles on Tibetan medicine.

== His life and work ==
According to Professor Herbert Novak, a longtime friend of Theodore Illion, the latter was born in Canada in a wealthy family descended from a branch of the British royalty, the Plantagenets. He is supposed to have left home at a very young age.

In the 1930s Theodore Illion published two travelogues :

- Rätselhaftes Tibet (1936) and its English translation In Secret Tibet (1937),
- Darkness over Tibet (1938), published directly in English, in which he claimed to have been able to stay in Tibet from 1934 till 1936 thanks to a disguise and his knowledge of Tibetan. In the first book, he recounts his first meetings and in the second book his alleged discovery of an underground city which sheltered a community of highly initiated beings governed by a sorcerer and indulging in black magic and cannibalism.

The Hulton Archive at Gettyimages contains photos of the writer, taken in London in April 1934, before his planned departure for Tibet:

- The first one shows Illion, dubbed an "explorer and philosopher", "flanked by his two companions on the eve of his departure."
- In the second one, taken on the same day, he is shown wearing the headgear that he believes will afford the best protection during his expedition – a napkin… .
- The third one, taken on April 14, 1934, shows Illion "paddling a tiny rubber dinghy" that he will take on his expedition.

After World War II, the author wrote various articles and books on Tibetan medicine under the pseudonym of Theodor Burang or Theodor Nolling, notably :

- (Theodor Burang), Tibetische Heilkunde (1957) (to be later translated into English and published under the title The Tibetan art of healing in 1974);
- (Theodor Burang), Die Kunst des Heilens im Fernen Osten. Heilverfahren und Heilmittel (1975).

The first book was criticized for containing vague and superficial assertions that were not supported by genuine references or quotations. Similar criticism was levelled at the second book for containing unverifiable claims.

According to Herbert Novak, Illion was a member of the Club of Rome in the 1980s and 1990s. He was in touch with Italian tibetologist Giuseppe Tucci. Illion was an astute, friendly, helpful, and quite humorous character. He never married and was survived by no offspring. He is buried in the village of Kuchi, 20 km (12 mi) south of Salzburg. The local newspaper Salzburger Nachrichten published his obituary.

== Reviews ==
In his book Lost Cities of China, Central Asia, and India (1998), David Hatcher Childress raises the possibility that Darkness Over Tibet is an alarmist novel under the guise of a travelogue.

Physician and bibliographer Jürgen C. Aschoff highly doubts that Theodore Illion ever went to Tibet or even approached the borders of Tibet. His books are, in his eyes, "truly science fiction, a figment of the imagination." He finds it incredible that Illion’s publications should still be read and cited in so many scientific articles and books on Tibetan medicine, although the author never mentioned a single line of published reference or renowned Tibetan doctor in support of his more than vague assertions.

== His published work ==
- (Theodor Illion), Rätselhaftes Tibet: in Verkleidung unter Lamas, Räubern und wahrhaft Weisen, Uranus Verlag, Hamburg, 1936, 145 p.
- (Theodore Illion), In Secret Tibet: In Disguise Amongst Lamas, Robbers, and Wisemen. A Key to the Mysteries of Tibet (translated from English), Rider & Co., 1937, 178 p. (reprinted in March 1983)
- (Theodore Illion), Darkness over Tibet, Rider & Co., London, 1937 (reprinted by Adventures Unlimited Press in 1991)
- (Theodor Burang), Tibeter über das Abendland: Stimmen aus dem geheimnisvollen Tibet, Igonta Verlag, Salzburg, 1947, 215 p.
- (Theodore Illion), Beherrschung seelischer Kräfte durch den Tibetanischen Menschen, in Schweizer Rundschau (Solothurn), 48 (1948/49), pp. 779–784
- (Theodor Burang), Tibetische Heilkunde, Origo-Verlag, in Zürich, 1957, 170 p. (to be later translated into English and published under the title The Tibetan art of healing)
- (Theodore Burang), The Tibetan art of healing, London, Watkins, 1974, ix + 117 p. (translated from Tibetische Heilkunde by S. Macintosh )
- (Theodor Burang), Der Arzt in der tibetischen Kultur, Origo Verlag, Zürich, 1975, 112 p.
- (Theodor Burang) Die Kunst des Heilens im Fernen Osten. Heilverfahren und Heilmittel, Origo-Verlag, Zürich, 1975
- (Theodor Burang), Tibetan Medicine on Cancer, in Dawa Norbu, An Introduction to Tibetan Medicine, pp. 52–61, Tibetan Review Publishing House, Delhi, 1976
- (Theodore Burang), L'arte di guarire nella Medicina Tibetana, Astrolabio Ubaldini Edizioni, Roma, 1976, 93 p., (translated into Italian by Serena Cavallo)
- (Theodor Burang), Cancer Therapy of Tibetan Healers, in American Journal of Chinese Medicine (Garden City, N.Y.), 7 (1979), pp. 294–296
- (Theodor Nolling), Grundlagen und Heilverfahren der tibetischen Medizin, Berlin

== See also ==
- History of European exploration in Tibet
- Lobsang Rampa
