= Agnes Keith =

Agnes Keith may refer to:

- Agnes Keith, Countess of Moray (c. 1540–1588)
- Agnes Newton Keith (1901–1982), writer
