= KCLC =

- St. Charles, Missouri; United States
- Broadcast area: Greater St. Louis
- Frequency: 89.1 MHz (HD Radio)
- Branding: 89.1 FM KCLC

Programming
- Format: Album adult alternative
- Subchannels: HD2 and HD3: College radio

Ownership
- Owner: Lindenwood University

History
- First air date: October 1968

Technical information
- Licensing authority: FCC
- Facility ID: 37722
- Class: C2
- ERP: 50,000 watts
- HAAT: 72.7 meters (239 ft)
- Transmitter coordinates: 38°47′5″N 90°30′5″W

Links
- Public license information: Public file; LMS
- Webcast: Listen Live; Listen Live (HD2); Listen Live (HD3)
- Website: 891thewood.com

KCLC (89.1 FM) is a non-commercial radio station licensed to St. Charles, Missouri, United States, and serves the St. Louis metropolitan area. It is owned by Lindenwood University, with students hosting most of the programs. It broadcasts an adult album alternative format, with other genres also heard.

KCLC broadcasts in HD Radio; the HD-2 digital subchannel is called "The Experience", and the HD-3 digital subchannel is called "The Tower".

== History ==
The station signed on the air in October 1968. KCLC underwent major facility upgrades in late August 2010. It included a new antenna and transmitter, new studio hardware and software, and the capability for HD broadcasting. In 2022, KCLC dropped its longtime moniker "The Wood."
