= George Keith =

George Keith may refer to:

- George Keith (missionary) (1638/39–1719), Scottish Quaker missionary
- George Keith (soccer) (born 1944), Scottish-born former footballer who represented Australia
- George Mouat Keith (1764–1832), Royal Navy officer
- George Noel Keith (1921–1943), pilot during World War II
- George Skene Keith (1752–1823), Scottish minister and writer
- George Skene Keith (physician) (1819–1910), Scottish physician, photographer and author
- George Keith, 5th Earl Marischal (died 1623), Scottish nobleman
- George Keith, 10th Earl Marischal (1692–1778), Scottish and Prussian army officer and diplomat
- George L. Keith (1924–2012), Canadian politician in the Legislative Assembly of New Brunswick
- George H. Keith (1825–1882), American politician in the Minnesota House of Representatives
