= Bill Keith (artist) =

American writer

William Keith (January 20, 1929 – September 1, 2004) was an American artist who began his artistic life as a painter, but moved into photography and visual poetry. His visual poetry ran a full gamut from calligrams inspired by Apollinaire and other early 20th Century French poets to Lettrisme to the Minimalism and Op Art of the 1960s.

As his work developed, Keith concentrated increasingly on African and African-American themes and sources. This development toward African roots and branches led away from the Roman alphabet and more toward the store of iconography and symbolism from Egypt to South Africa to the American diaspora. Consequently, Keith developed graphic techniques suggested by textiles, wood carvings, bronze casts, ceramics, and other indigenous arts.

An example of Keith's recreation of the substance of his visual style and the very nature of his own particular artistic interventions would now be traced in his use of rhythmic patterns through repetitions of graphic elements from sources as diverse as road signs and zebra stripes. Keith's work as a whole became a celebration of the adventures of African sources as they moved and interacted with the rest of the world. Individual works may initially seem merely decorative, but familiarity reveals a call to the kinetics and dynamics of celebration.

Upon his death, Keith was survived by his sons, Antar and Tarik, to whom he dedicated his book, "Pictographs."

== Bibliography ==
- Sphinx (Xerolage, 1992)
- Wisdom (Runaway Spoon, 1993)
- Pictographs (Left Hand Books, 1996)
- Stalking the Minotaur (Koja Press, 2003)
