= Keith Williams (bodybuilder) =

American bodybuilder and football player

Keith Anthony Lamar Williams (born May 16, 1973) is an American bodybuilder and former American football player. He and his wife reside in Lawrence, Kansas.

== Family ==
- Tina Williams - Wife
- Kansas Williams - Daughter

== Physical statistics ==
- Age: 53
- Height: 5'10”
- Weight: Contest 245-250 lbs (111–113 kg or 17 stone, 7 lbs to 17 stone, 9 lbs) Off Season 287

== NPC Contest Record ==
- September 2008 NPC North Americans - Superheavyweight -4th
- July 2008 NPC Flex Wheeler Classic, Superheavyweight -Class and Overall Winner
- June 2008 NPC JR. Nationals, Super heavyweight division placed - 2nd
- July 2007 USA Championships Las Vegas, NV Super heavyweight division placed - 8th
- June 2007 Jr. National Championships Chicago, IL Super heavyweight division - 4th
- July 2006 USA Championships Las Vegas, NV Super heavyweight division - 11th
- July 2006 Mr. Minnesota/ Mr. Midwest Super heavyweight Champion
- June 2006 Junior Nationals Chicago, IL Heavyweight division - 4th
- April 2005 Gopher State Competition MN Heavyweight Champion

== Football ==
(5-11, 220, 4.20)

Positions: RB, KR, Special Teams Specialist, CB

- Minnesota Vikings

Signed February 2002 as DB

- Green Bay Packers

(CB/KR) Signed: April 12, 1999

- St. Cloud State University:

1995: All-Conference in football for SCSU North Central Conference All-American
