= Patrice Louvet =

French American business executive (born 1964)

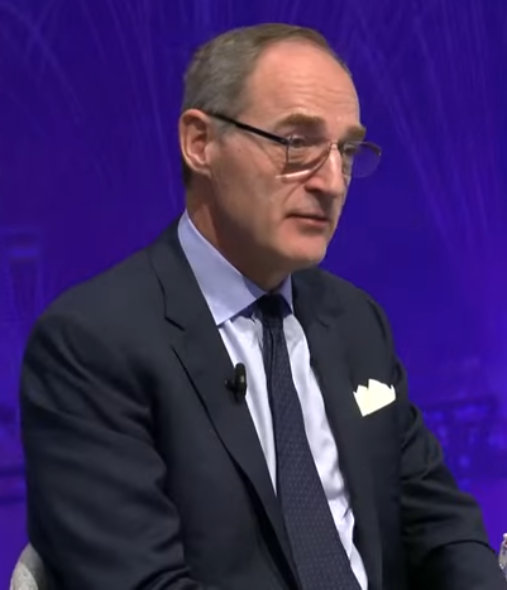
- At the WEF Annual Meeting in 2025
- Born: 1964 (age 61–62); Saint-Cloud, France
- Education: ESCP Business School (MBA); University of Illinois Urbana-Champaign (MBA)
- Occupation: Business executive
- Years active: 1989–present
- Employer: Ralph Lauren
- Board member of: Bacardi Limited

Patrice Louvet (born 1964) is a French-born business executive based in New York City. The CEO and president of the Ralph Lauren Corporation since July 2017, began his career at Procter & Gamble (P&G) in 1989, where he held numerous executive roles across Northeast Asia, North America, and Europe. In 2015 he became group president of P&G's global beauty and hair care units, a role he held until June 2017. He is on the board of Bacardi Limited.

== Early life and education ==
Patrice Jean Louis Louvet was born in 1964 in Saint-Cloud, France. He spent four years of his childhood in Princeton, New Jersey, with his family as a result of his father heading the U.S. subsidiary of a French chemical company. In 1986, Louvet graduated from ESCP Europe with a master's degree in business administration (MBA) and earned a second MBA from the University of Illinois in 1987. During his graduate studies, he served as a marketing professor for undergraduate students and authored the book Overcoming Barriers to Entering the US Market. From 1987 until 1989, he briefly served as a naval officer and aide-de-camp to an Admiral in the French Navy.

== Career ==
=== 1989-2010 ===
In 1989, Louvet joined P&G's marketing department in France and was appointed marketing director for Pantene's global franchise in Cincinnati, Ohio ten years later. In 2002, he moved to Japan to become P&G's general manager for health care and hair care in northeast Asia, returning to North America to spend four years in P&G's hair colorant division. In 2005, he became vice president of global hair colorants, running the Clairol and Wella brands from Stamford, Connecticut.

In March 2008 he transferred to Geneva, Switzerland as vice president of future strategy and growth for the global prestige products unit of P&G. From 2010 to 2011, he was president of the unit, overseeing fragrances, skin care, cosmetics, hair care, and grooming, with brands such as Gucci, Dolce & Gabbana, Hugo Boss, Rochas, and Lacoste.

=== 2011-2017 ===
In 2011, Louvet was named president of global shave care for P&G, overseeing Gillette Company, and two years later group president of global grooming and shaving. The role gave him oversight of the company's grooming brands, including Braun electric razors, Venus razors, and the global Gillette shaving business.

In 2015, P&G appointed Louvet to group president of the company's global beauty and hair care units. Louvet remained in this role following Coty Inc.'s acquisition of P&G's perfume, hair care and make-up US businesses in July 2015. In this role, he oversaw 12 brands in the global beauty unit, including Head & Shoulders, Pantene, Olay, and Old Spice, which generated about $11.5 billion in combined revenue in 2016. By early 2017, Louvet had worked in six of P&G's 10 product categories.

=== 2017-present ===
In May 2017, the Ralph Lauren Corporation selected Louvet as its future CEO and president, effective July. Louvet also joined the board in July. Louvet became the third appointed CEO in the history of the company. Founder Ralph Lauren stepped down as CEO in 2015 and remains as executive chairman and chief creative officer. Stefan Larsson became CEO in 2015, but after he announced his resignation in February 2017, chief financial officer Jane Nielsen was appointed interim CEO on May 1 while the company searched for a successor.

Louvet stated plans to retire from P&G on 30 June, with P&G saying it would name a successor to lead its beauty division at a later time. As the new Ralph Lauren CEO, Louvet reports to executive chairman and creative director Ralph Lauren and the company's board of directors. Lauren stated that he was "thrilled" about "finding the right partner to work with me," citing Louvet's "collaborative working style, transformation experience and intense focus on results."

In 2023, Louvet's total compensation from Ralph Lauren was $14.5 million.

=== Management style ===
In April 2025, Louvet received attention for his candid leadership philosophy, stating in an interview that when dealing with significant issues, sometimes some employees may "need to be hit by a 2×4 across the forehead." The comment prompted discussion of his no-nonsense approach to feedback, though there were no formal complaints or allegations resulting from it.

== Board memberships ==
Louvet is a member of the board of directors of Danone since 2022, and of Bacardi Limited since 2012. He is also a member of The Business Council.

== Personal life ==
As of May 2017, Louvet is based in the New York metropolitan area. He and his wife Christine have two children.

== See also ==
- List of University of Illinois at Urbana-Champaign people
