= Justice Keith =

Justice Keith may refer to:

- Brian Keith (judge) (born 1944), justice of the High Court of England and Wales
- James Keith (Virginia judge) (1839–1918), associate justice of the Virginia Supreme Court of Appeals
- Sandy Keith (1928–2020), chief justice of the Minnesota Supreme Court
