= Stefan Larsson (businessman) =

American fashion industry executive

- Born: 1974 or 1975 (age 51–52)
- Education: Hanken School of Economics; Jönköping International Business School
- Occupation: Business executive

Stefan Larsson (born 1974 or 1975) is an American and Swedish fashion industry executive. Since 2021 he has served as the chief executive officer of PVH Corporation. Before joining PVH he was the chief executive officer of the Ralph Lauren Corporation, global president of Old Navy, and part of H&M management for nearly 15 years.

== Early life and education ==
Born in 1974, Larsson earned an MBA jointly from the Hanken School of Economics in Finland and Jönköping International Business School in Sweden.

== Career ==
=== Hennes & Mauritz ===
Larsson joined the Swedish fashion company Hennes & Mauritz (H&M) in 1998 after having completed his studies and stayed with the retailer for nearly 15 years, rising to the position of Head of Global Sales "with functional responsibility for about 2,300 stores and nearly all of its $17 billion in annual sales." During that time, he was part of the executive team that increased annual revenues from $3 billion to $17 billion and expanded its operations from 12 to 44 countries. He also oversaw real estate, store design and construction.

=== Old Navy ===
Larsson served as global president of Old Navy, part of The Gap's portfolio, from October 2012 to September 2015. In April 2012, Gap Inc. sponsored a U.S. work and residence permit for Larsson and his immediate family. In addition to a $350,000 sign-on bonus, his initial salary was $1 mio. per year plus annual bonus and stock options/awards. Larrson transformed Old Navy into Gap Inc.'s top performing business unit, achieving three consecutive years of profitable growth and better sales revenues than Banana Republic and Gap. By offering fashionable clothing at low prices and overhauling its global supply chain to increase speed to market, Larsson increased Old Navy's revenue by nearly $1 billion.

=== Ralph Lauren ===
In September 2015, it was announced that Stefan Larsson would replace the company's founder, Ralph Lauren, as CEO in November. Lauren stayed on as executive chairman and chief creative officer.

The company and Stefan Larsson mutually agreed to part ways after Ralph Lauren stated they found themselves having different views on how to evolve the creative and consumer-facing parts of the business.

In February 2017, it was announced that Larsson had agreed to leave his position as CEO effective May 2017 due to differences with Lauren. On the day of Larsson's departure, the company's share price fell by 12%. He was replaced by Patrice Louvet.

=== PVH Corporation ===
In June 2019 Larsson became president of PVH Corporation. Larsson oversees all of PVH's brands and regions, including Calvin Klein and Tommy Hilfiger. On February 1, 2021, PVH officially appointed Stefan Larsson as chief executive officer and he joined its board of directors.

=== The RealReal Inc. ===
Larsson served on the board of directors for the RealReal Inc, a resell platform for luxury goods which went public on Nasdaq in June 2019.
