= Richard Keith =

Richard Keith may refer to:

- Richard Keith (actor) (born 1950), American actor known for appearing on I Love Lucy
- Dick Keith (1933–1967), Northern Irish footballer
- Richard H. Keith (1842–1905), American known for coal, lumber, railroads and towns
- Richard Keith (writer/actor/director) (born 1982), American writer, actor and director known for creating The CW series Significant Mother

== See also ==
- Keith Richard (basketball)
- Keith Richards (born 1943), English musician and songwriter
