= Henry Keith =

Henry Keith may refer to:

- Henry Keith, Baron Keith of Kinkel (1922–2002), Scottish judge
- Harry Keith (Henry George Keith, 1899–1982), British conservator of forests in North Borneo
