= Alexander Keith =

Alexander Keith may refer to:

- Alexander Keith (politician) (1795–1873), Canadian politician, freemason and brewer
- Alexander Keith (minister) (1791–1880), Scottish clergyman
- Alexander Keith Jr. (1827–1875), Canadian mass murderer
- Sandy Keith (Alexander M. Keith, 1928–2020), American politician
- Alexander Keith, 18th-century Church of England clergyman responsible for thousands of clandestine marriages; see Keith's Chapel
- Sir Alexander Keith of Dunnottar, Knight Marischal (died 1819), namesake of the Keith Medal

== See also ==
- Alexander Keith's Brewery, brewery and beer brand
- Keith Alexander (disambiguation)
