= Keith Charles =

Keith Charles may refer to:

- Keith Charles (Six Feet Under), character on the American TV series Six Feet Under
- Keith Charles (actor) (1934–2008), American theatre and television actor
