= Jim Keith =

American conspiracy theorist (1949–1999)

- Keith in the late 1990s
- Born: James Patrick Keith; September 21, 1949; Kansas City, Missouri, United States
- Died: September 7, 1999 (aged 49)

James Patrick Keith (September 21, 1949 – September 7, 1999) was an American author and conspiracy theorist. He authored several books on conspiracy topics like mind control, the New World Order, black helicopters, and the Illuminati, including The Gemstone File, The Octopus: The Secret Government and Death of Danny Casolaro, The New World Order, Saucers of the Illuminati, Black Helicopters Over America, and Black Helicopters II: The Endgame Strategy.

== Early life ==
James Patrick Keith was born in 1949. He grew up in Los Angeles, California. In his youth in the 1950s, Keith had an interest in what scholar Michael Barkun described as "fringe publications". He became interested in UFOs and the occult from age 7, writing short stories and articles at age 10.

A self-described radical libertarian, he avoided the Vietnam War draft as a conscientious objector, he left Haight-Ashbury and hitchhiked to Klamath Falls in 1972. The same year, aged 23, Keith joined the Church of Scientology, which he was a member of for a decade. At this time he worked a number of jobs. At various times he owned an Oregon record store, worked on a chicken farm, and edited some weekly newspapers in Klamath. There he worked as a newspaper publisher, cable TV salesman, restaurant worker and at a lumber mill. He also contributed to small publications on science fiction, New Age and conspiracy topics.

== Writing ==
After leaving the Church of Scientology in the 1980s, Keith began to work as a conspiracy writer. After starting his career with writing and editing the zines Dharma Combat and Notes from the Hangar, as well as contributing articles to Fate Magazine, Keith became an editor at Kenn Thomas's Steamshovel Press. He did several radio and television interviews on conspiracy topics. During this time, he worked out of his home on writing projects to make money, writing six hours a day.

In 1992, Keith began publishing books on conspiracy topics. His main publisher was the Georgia-based IllumiNet Press. His books covered topics related to UFOs, the New World Order, black helicopters, the Men in Black, the Illuminati, and mind control. His first book, The Gemstone File, discusses the file of the same name. It was written in three months and accepted by IllumiNet Press with a $250 advance. One week later, his work Secret and Suppressed was accepted by Feral House with a $500 advance. He also co-wrote The Octopus with Kenn Thomas, detailing theories around the death of reporter Danny Casolaro. By 1995, his books had sold 75,000 copies. He may have also been the pseudonymous conspiracy writer "Commander X", though this is disputed by some who knew Keith.

Initially, Keith, though writing frequently on UFOs, did not believe UFOs to be caused by extraterrestrials, but believed them to be a plot by the elites; people who believed they were contacted by aliens were actually victims of CIA mind control. In his later writings, he shifted course, and embraced the existence of aliens alongside government plots. Barkun wrote that while Keith's work contained no explicit antisemitism, unlike many other conspiracy writers, many of the sources he drew on were antisemitic; he said that he would not "vouch for white supremacists or anarchists as his readership". The historian Nicholas Goodrick-Clarke described him as a "veteran U.S. conspiracy theorist", while Michael Barkun described his work on black helicopters, Black Helicopters Over America, to be the "central work on the subject".

== Death and controversy ==
On September 6, 1999, Keith injured his leg after stepping off a three-foot stage at the Burning Man festival. Thinking it was only a severe sprain, he went home. The next morning, in severe pain, he checked into the Washoe Medical center for treatment of a broken knee. On September 7, 1999, a blood clot released from his leg and entered his lung, which resulted in his death aged 49.

After his death, conspiracy theorists expressed suspicion that he was killed because he mentioned the name of a physician who declared Princess Diana was pregnant at the time of her death.

== Bibliography ==
- ——, ed. (1992). The Gemstone File. Atlanta: IllumiNet Press. ISBN 0-9626534-5-4.
- —— (1993). Secret and Suppressed: Banned Ideas and Hidden History. Venice: Feral House. ISBN 0-922915-14-8.
- —— (1994). Black Helicopters Over America: Strikeforce for the New World Order. Lilburn: IllumiNet Press. ISBN 1-881532-05-4.
- —— (1994). Casebook on Alternative 3: UFOs, Secret Societies and World Control. Lilburn: IllumiNet Press. ISBN 0-9626534-9-7.
- Thomas, Kenn; —— (1996). The Octopus: Secret Government and the Death of Danny Casolaro. Portland: Feral House. ISBN 0-922915-39-3.
  - Thomas, Kenn; —— (2004). The Octopus: Secret Government and the Death of Danny Casolaro (Revised ed.). Los Angeles: Feral House. ISBN 0-922915-91-1.
- —— (1996). Okbomb! Conspiracy and Cover-Up. Lilburn: IllumiNet Press. ISBN 1-881532-08-9.
- —— (1997). Casebook on the Men in Black. Lilburn: IllumiNet Press. ISBN 1-881532-11-9.
- —— (1997). Mind Control, World Control: The Encyclopedia of Mind Control. Kempton: Adventures Unlimited Press. ISBN 0-932813-45-3.
- —— (1997). Black Helicopters II: The End Game Strategy. Lilburn: IllumiNet Press. ISBN 1-881532-14-3.
- —— (1999). Biowarfare In America. Atlanta: IllumiNet Press. ISBN 1-881532-21-6.
- —— (1999). Saucers of the Illuminati. Lilburn: IllumiNet Press. ISBN 1-881532-03-8.
- —— (1999). Mind Control and UFOs: Casebook on Alternative 3. Lilburn: IllumiNet Press. ISBN 1-881532-17-8.
- —— (2003). Mass Control: Engineering Human Consciousness. Kempton: Adventures Unlimited Press. ISBN 1-881532-20-8.
