= William Keith (footballer) =

Scottish footballer

Personal information
- Full name: William Keith
- Place of birth: Scotland
- Position: Inside right

Senior career*
Years	Team	Apps	(Gls)
1913–1916	Queen's Park	6	(3)
- * Club domestic league appearances and goals

William Keith was a Scottish amateur footballer who played as an inside right in the Scottish League for Queen's Park.

== Personal life ==
Keith served as a sergeant in the Argyll and Sutherland Highlanders during the First World War.

== Career statistics ==
Appearances and goals by club, season and competition
Club	Season	League			National Cup		Other		Total	
Club	Season	Division	Apps	Goals	Apps	Goals	Apps	Goals	Apps	Goals
Queen's Park	1914–15	Scottish First Division	2	0	—		0	0	2	0
Queen's Park	1915–16	Scottish First Division	4	3	—		1 (Note: Appearances in Glasgow Cup)	0	5	3
Career total			6	3	—		1	0	7	3
