= Charlie Keith =

British clown and circus manager (1836–1895)

- Born: Charles Henry Keith; May 2, 1836; Clerkenwell, London
- Died: March 16, 1895 (aged 58); Bury, Lancashire
- Occupations: Clown; Circus manager
- Known for: Clowning

Charlie Keith (May 2, 1836 – March 16, 1895) was a British clown and circus manager.

== Early life ==
Charles Henry Keith was born in Clerkenwell, London, on May 2, 1836. His father, George John Keith, worked as a pastry cook and confectioner in London before his death in 1856.

== Circus life ==
In the early 1850s, Charlie Keith entered show business at the Royal Strand Theatre, appearing as a sprite in a pantomime featuring Julia Craven and Willie Edouin. Keith fulfilled his first engagement as a tumbler at Abbott's Theatre in 1852. He also performed as a tumbler at Lord Rodney's Head in Whitechapel in 1855. He later appeared at the Bower Saloon in Stangate.

=== Clown ===
He developed his performance into a clowning act and started touring the UK's music hall theatres as his popularity grew. Around 1858, he began his first venture in the direction with a brief season with Marie Macarte's Circus in Bradford in Yorkshire. Soon after, Keith joined Howes & Cushing's Great United States Circus at the Alhambra Theatre in London. He toured the continent with Woolschlager's Circus and spent about three years abroad. Upon returning to England, he reappeared at the Alhambra with Franconi's Circus and later toured Spain, Portugal, France, Germany, and Russia. He performed before royalty, including the Prussian royal family, the King and Queen of the Belgians, the Russian Czar and Czarina, Napoleon III, and the Prince Imperial.

During a dinner at the Palace of St. Cloud on September 27, 1864, Napoleon III named him the "English clown to the Prince Imperial of France," Louis-Napoléon. On the occasion of his appearance, he was presented with a diamond ring. Keith made an appearance at Franconi's Cirque Imperial in Rouen in 1865. His routine involved snatching a hat from a performer disguised as a crowd member and performing tricks, including a somersault that ruined it, prompting them to chase him off with an umbrella.

After returning to England in 1866, Charlie Keith started working independently.

Following engagements at top venues in Europe, he appeared with the Great American Circus at the Royal Amphitheatre in 1868 in Holborn.

By 1868, Keith had become a successful performer and established his own permanent circus, The Grand Cirque Imperial, in Exeter. The show combined equestrian displays with juggling, gymnastics, and clown acts.

He toured as a clown in Teatro Circo Price under Thomas Price for nearly 20 months in Spain and Portugal during 1871–1872. Following that, he performed with Albert Salamonsky's circus from June 1872 to December 1873 across Russia, Poland, Prussia, Austria, and Hungary.

He founded a circus on Princes Street in Derby, on the former site of the Star Theatre, which was later lost to a fire on March 25, 1879. Following the devastating fire that destroyed his circus and horses in Derby, Charlie Keith received widespread support from the local community. With assistance from the Markets Committee, he erected a new permanent structure—Charlie Keith's New Grand Circus—on the Holmes in Derby. The new venue, built by Mr. Daykin to Keith's own design, opened on April 12, 1879, and featured a pit, promenade, spacious gallery, reserved seating, private boxes, and a waterproof roof manufactured by Sullivan of Manchester.

Afterwards, he established his own traveling circus. Keith submitted a patent for a traveling circus building in 1882. He introduced a novel form of circus known as Charlie Keith's Patent Carriage Circus, which was constructed from carriages connected together to form a mobile yet fully enclosed and waterproof performance venue. The structure included cushioned reserved seating, pit seats covered with Brussels carpet, and a well-appointed gallery capable of accommodating 500 people. He led his circus troupe on international tours, using his own patented designs to build temporary circus structures and performing for Europe's nobility and royal courts. He toured the world as a circus proprietor and clown, constructing as many as 65 circus buildings. He became known all over Europe as "the roving English clown."

Charlie Keith, already touring with his portable circus in 1882, brought William Tudor into the company that year. In 1888, now a well-known clown, manager, and tent designer, Keith co-founded Keith & Tudor's Circus at Butt's Green, Midsummer Common, Cambridge. That year, the pair did a production of Cinderella.

Keith entered a partnership to establish Keith & Palmyra's Circus in 1890. After arriving in Derby on October 6, 1890, they opened a new circus building on October 26. The permanent circus structure stood in St. Peter's Churchyard before the County Court took over the location.

He erected his sixty-first circus building in Gloucester on Barton Street in March 1893. In 1894, he oversaw the building of his sixty-third structure in Coventry.

== Death ==
Charlie Keith died at 59 years old in Bury, Lancashire, on March 16, 1895.

== Legacy ==
He enjoyed a close relationship with General Juan Prim in Madrid, toured with the Prince of Wales, and performed for Europe's royal families. He performed before audiences of every nationality—European, American, African, Asiatic, and Brazilian.

In 1874, the Hanlon-Lees said, "Charlie Keith is one of the best Clowns on the Continent of Europe."

While in Derby, he wrote a 100-page book titled "Circus Life and Amusements (Equestrian, Dramatic, & Musical), in All Nations," published in 1879 by Bewley & Roe of the Gazette. The account traced his circus life from boyhood to the Derby fire incident.
