= Robert William Keith =

British composer

- Born: 20 March 1787; Stepney, London, England
- Died: 19 June 1846 (aged 59)
- Occupations: musical composer and writer
- Known for: sacred music
- Notable work: A Selection of Sacred Melodies; instruction-books for pianoforte, flute, and Spanish guitar
- Father: Cornelius Keith (organist)
- Relatives: William Keith (organist, grandfather)

Robert William Keith (1787–1846) was an English musical composer and writer.

== Life ==
Born at Stepney on 20 March 1787, he was the son of Cornelius Keith, organist of St. Peter's, Cornhill, and of the Danish Chapel in Wellclose Street, and the grandson of William Keith, organist of West Ham Church (d. 1800). From the latter Keith learnt the rudiments of music, and from François Hippolyte Barthélémon and others the violin, harmony, and composition.

Keith kept at 131 Cheapside a musical and musical instrument warehouse, and prepared many of his own publications. He died on 19 June 1846.

== Works ==
While organist and composer to the New Jerusalem Church in Friars Street, Keith published A Selection of Sacred Melodies … to which is prefixed Instructions for the use of Young Organists …, London, 1816. There followed A Musical Vade Mecum, being a compendious Introduction to the whole art of Music; Part I, containing the Principles of Notation, etc., in an easy categorical form, apprehensible to the meanest capacity, London, 1820 (?); Part II, Elements of Musical Composition.

Keith compiled instruction-books for pianoforte, flute, and Spanish guitar (by "Paulus Prucilli"), and a violin preceptor, which went through many editions. Some of Keith's sacred music was published by Muzio Clementi. He set to music elegiac verses Britannia, Mourn, on the death of the Princess Charlotte Augusta of Wales, 1817; arranged the overture and airs from Der Freischütz as duet for two violins, c. 1830; and edited Favourite Airs with Variations, for the Violin.

== Notes ==
Attribution

This article incorporates text from a publication now in the public domain: Lee, Sidney, ed. (1892). "Keith, Robert William". Dictionary of National Biography. Vol. 30. London: Smith, Elder & Co.
