= Marlise Keith =

South African artist

- Born: 9 June 1972 (age 53)
- Occupation: artist
- Known for: Winner, Vuleka Art Competition, 2006

Marlise Keith (born 9 June 1972) is a South African artist working in ink, pencil and acrylics on large-scale canvas, board and glass (reverse glass painting). Her works can be found in a number of international collections in South Africa, America, Britain, Germany, Portugal and Sweden. She worked as an art teacher at Rustenburg High School for Girls in Cape Town until 2003.

Keith received a BA Fine Arts at the University of Pretoria in 1995 and a Master's Degree in Fine arts at the University of Stellenbosch in 2000. She taught high school art and was later head of the production design department at AFDA, The School for the Creative Economy before working full time as an artist in 2006.

== Works ==
Keith's work is influenced by people, her surroundings and aspects of her personal life. Dreams play an important role in many works, where she captures often disturbing but mostly surreal moments in small, detailed areas of her larger works. It is important to examine her works in great detail to see images receding into the surface and to fully enjoy the complexity and whimsical nature of her illustrative style. Keith has exhibited widely and her works are to be found in collections all around the world.

== Awards ==
Winner of the Vuleka Art Competition 2006

Team Sanity, 140 x 100 cm, Mixed media on board, 2006

Selected for the Absa Atelier 2006

== Shows ==
Elysian Fields at UCA Gallery in Cape Town, South Africa 2009
