= John Lucien Keith =

British civil servant

John Lucien Keith CBE was a British colonial official and then a civil servant in the Colonial Office. He had previously held positions in the administration of Northern Rhodesia.

In 1932 he was elected to the Royal Aero Club.

Keith was the District Commissioner at Ndola during the Copperbelt strike of 1935. He told the following Commission of Enquiry that although the Employment of Natives Ordnance prohibited Africans from striking under threat of criminal prosecution, it would be inevitable that they would sooner or later create a mechanism of representation, and that the authorities would be well advised to establish legally recognised trade unions.

During the Second World War was the Colonial Office Welfare Officer responsible for the British Honduras Forestry Unit. When the Guyanese journalist Rudolph Dunbar wrote a critical article about the conditions the workers in this unit had to endure, Keith responded defending the conditions in their camps, which he had visited several times. Whilst he admitted the food had been of poor quality, he claimed that this had been remedied. Whilst Keith denied that there were no problems with the sanitary arrangements, Dunbar's account of their inadequacy had also been born out by Dr Patterson, the Medical Officer of the unit.

Keith was appointed chairman of the Colonial Office's Advisory Committee on the Welfare of Colonial Peoples in the United Kingdom.

In 1951 Keith was awarded the Order of the British Empire.

== Publications ==
- (1946) "African Students in Great Britain", African Affairs, Volume 45, Issue 179, April 1946, Pages 65–7
