= David Hatcher Childress =

American author

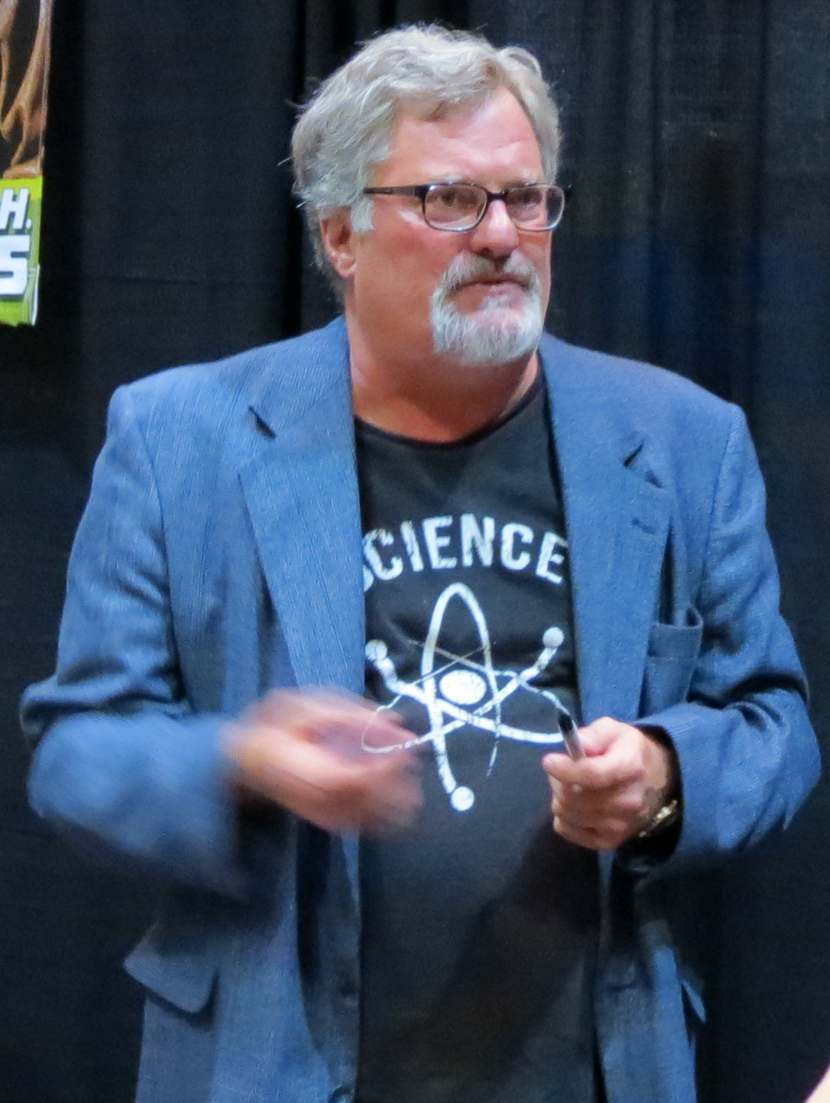
- Childress at AlienCon 2016
- Born: June 1, 1957 (age 69); France
- Citizenship: United States
- Occupation: Author

David Hatcher Childress (born June 1, 1957) is an American author, and the owner of Adventures Unlimited Press, a publishing house established in 1984 specializing in books on topics such as ancient mysteries, unexplained phenomena, pseudohistory, and historical revisionism. His own works primarily concentrate on pseudoarchaeological and pseudoscientific topics such as "UFOs, secret societies, suppressed technology, cryptozoology [and] conspiracy theory". Childress, having no degree, refers to himself as a "rogue archaeologist". He makes frequent appearances on Ancient Aliens.

== Biography ==
Born in France to American parents, and raised in Colorado and Montana, United States, Childress went to University of Montana–Missoula to study archaeology, but left college in 1976 at 19 to begin travelling in pursuit of his archaeological interests. After several years in Asia and then Africa, Childress moved in 1983 to Stelle, Illinois, a community founded by New Age writer Richard Kieninger; Childress had been given one of Kieninger's books while touring Africa. Childress chronicled his explorations in the 1970s, 1980s, and 1990s in his Lost Cities and Ancient Mysteries series of books.

Childress's first book, A Hitchhikers Guide to Africa and Arabia, was published in 1983 by Chicago Review Press. In 1984, Childress moved to Kempton, Illinois, and established a publishing company named Adventures Unlimited Press, which is a sole proprietorship. His company published his own works and then those of other authors, presenting fringe-scientific theories regarding ancient civilizations, cryptozoology, and little-known technologies. In 1992, Childress founded the World Explorers Club, which occasionally runs tours to places he writes about, and publishes a magazine called World Explorer.

== Reception ==
Patrick D. Nunn, a professor of geography at the University of the Sunshine Coast has noted that Childress is a proponent of pseudoscientific claims such as the lost continent Mu and megaliths on the Pacific islands built by levitation. Nunn wrote that "the disappearance of Mu is very convenient because it means that theorists like Childress can say what they like and appear convincing to people who are comparatively uninformed, as many naturally are, of the huge body of scientific information on Pacific geology and cultures."

Historical archaeologist Charles E. Orser (editor of International Journal of Historical Archaeology) has criticized Childress's writings:

Pseudo-archaeologists continue to perpetuate the idea that Atlantis was a racialized place. David Hatcher Childress, one of the most flagrant violators of basic archaeological reasoning, has provided perhaps the most outrageous racialized vision of Atlantis. In discussing Tiahuanaco in Bolivia—as a palace built long before any Native South Americans were present—Childress proposes that the majestic site could only have been constructed by the "Atlantean League." The league was composed of mythic seafarers who "sailed the world spreading a megalithic culture, and wore red turbans over their blond hair" (Childress 1986: 139, emphasis added). Nowhere did Plato, the only actual source on Atlantis, mention the blond hair of the Atlanteans. Plato did mention that the men and women of Atlantis, being semi-divine, were inherently good . . . The correlation between goodness and whiteness is thus obvious in Childress's formulation and in much else that has been written about Atlantis.

— Charles E. Orser, Race and Practice in Archaeological Interpretation

== Publications ==
Childress's company has published nearly 200 books (many translated into foreign languages) over the course of two dozen years. Childress himself has authored and co-authored over a dozen books, from his first in 1983 to his most recent in 2013. His influences include Erich von Däniken, Thor Heyerdahl, and Charles Berlitz.

=== Author or co-author ===
- A Hitchhikers Guide to Africa and Arabia, 1984, ISBN 0-914091-42-5
- Lost Cities and Ancient Mysteries of Africa and Arabia, 1984, ISBN 0-932813-06-2
- Lost Cities of China, Central Asia and India, 1984, ISBN 0-932813-07-0
- Lost Cities and Ancient Mysteries of South America, ISBN 0-932813-02-X
- Lost Cities of Ancient Lemuria and the Pacific, ISBN 0-932813-04-6
- Lost Cities of North and Central America, ISBN 0-932813-09-7
- Lost Cities of Atlantis, Ancient Europe and the Mediterranean, ISBN 0-932813-25-9
- Extraterrestrial Archeology ISBN 0-932813-77-1
- Vimana Aircraft of Ancient India and Atlantis, ISBN 0-932813-12-7
- Man-Made UFOs 1944-1994 (with Renato Vesco) ISBN 0-932813-23-2
- The Time Travel Handbook ISBN 0-932813-68-2
- Pirates and the Lost Templar Fleet ISBN 1-931882-18-5
- Technology of the Gods, The Incredible Science of the Ancients, ISBN 0-932813-73-9
- Lost Continents and the Hollow Earth ISBN 0-932813-63-1
- A Hitchhikers Guide to Armageddon ISBN 0-932813-84-4
- Mystery of the Olmecs ISBN 978-1-931882-71-2
- Inside the Gemstone File (with Kenn Thomas) ISBN 0-932813-66-6
- Lost Cities and Ancient Mysteries of the American Southwest ISBN 1-931882-94-0
- Yetis, Sasquatch and Hairy Giants ISBN 1-931882-98-3
- Ancient Micronesia and the Lost City of Nan Modal ISBN 0-932813-49-6 (1998)
- The Enigma of Cranial Deformation: Elongated Skulls of the Ancients (with Brien Foerster) (2012)
- Vimana : Flying Machines of the Ancients ISBN 1-939149-03-7 (2013)
- The Lost World of Cham: The TransPacific Voyages of the Champa ISBN 9781939149725(2017)
- Haunebu- the Secret Files: The Greatest Ufo Secret of All Time ISBN 978-1948803311 (2021)

=== Editor ===
- The Anti-Gravity Handbook 3rd ed (edited) ISBN 1-931882-17-7
- Anti-Gravity and the World Grid (edited) ISBN 0-932813-03-8
- Anti-Gravity and the Unified Field (edited) ISBN 0-932813-10-0
- The Free-Energy Device Handbook (edited) ISBN 0-932813-24-0
- The Tesla Papers ISBN 0-932813-86-0

=== Contributor ===
- Discovering the Mysteries of Ancient America: Lost History And Legends, Unearthed And Explored ISBN 1-56414-842-4
- Unearthing Ancient America: The Lost Sagas of Conquerors, Castaways, and Scoundrels ISBN 1-60163-031-X
- The Fantastic Inventions of Nikola Tesla ISBN 0-932813-19-4
