= Generation Z =

Cohort born from 1997 to 2012

Generation Z, often shortened to Gen Z and informally known as Zoomers, is the demographic cohort succeeding Millennials and preceding Generation Alpha. Researchers and popular media use the mid-to-late 1990s as starting birth years and the early 2010s as ending birth years, with the generation typically being defined as people born from 1997 to 2012. Most members of Generation Z are the children of younger Baby Boomers, Generation X and older Millennials, and it is predicted that they will predominantly be the parents of members of Generation Beta and, to a lesser extent, Generation Alpha.

As children in the mid-late 2000s and 2010s, Generation Z was the first social generation to grow up with Web 2.0 and digital technology as an established commodity. From a young age, they have watched online videos and web series (often via YouTube), and played online games. As adolescents and young adults in the 2010s and 2020s, members of the generation were dubbed "digital natives", even if they were not necessarily digitally literate and might struggle in a digital or virtual workplace.

Generation Z has been described as "better behaved and less hedonistic" than previous generations. They have fewer teenage pregnancies, consume less alcohol (but not necessarily less of other psychoactive drugs), and are more focused on school and job prospects. They are also better at delaying gratification than teens from the 1960s. Sexting became popular during Gen Z's adolescent years, although the long-term psychological effects are not yet fully understood.

There is greater awareness and diagnosis of mental health conditions among Generation Z, and sleep deprivation is more frequently reported. Moreover, the negative effects of screen time in the late 2010s were most pronounced in adolescents, as compared to younger children. Youth subcultures have not disappeared, but they have been quieter. Nostalgia is a major theme of youth culture in the 2010s and 2020s. Meanwhile, Generation Z has been active in politics around the world, taking advantage of social media for mobilization and communication.

== Terminology ==
The name Generation Z is a reference to it being the second generation after Generation X, continuing the alphabetical sequence from Generation Y (Millennials). Other names for the generation have included iGeneration, Homeland Generation, Digital Natives, Neo-Digital Natives (emphasizing the shift from PC to mobile and text to video among this cohort), Pluralist Generation, Internet Generation, and Centennials. The Pew Research Center surveyed the various terms for this cohort on Google Trends in 2019, and found that in the U.S., Generation Z was overwhelmingly the most popular. The Merriam-Webster and Oxford dictionaries both have official entries for Generation Z.

"While there is no scientific process for deciding when a name has stuck, the momentum is clearly behind Gen Z."

— Michael Dimmock, Pew Research Center

Psychologist and author Jean Twenge used the term iGeneration, intending it as the title of her 2006 book about Millennials but changing the title to Generation Me at the insistence of her publisher. Twenge later used the term for her 2017 book on Gen Z, iGen. Others also claim to have coined the name. Authors William Strauss and Neil Howe, creators of the Strauss–Howe generational theory, adopted the term Homeland Generation (or Homelanders) in 2005 after sponsoring a contest to name the post-Millennial group. The term Homeland refers to being the first generation to enter childhood after protective surveillance state measures, like the Department of Homeland Security, were put into effect following the September 11 attacks.

Zoomer is an informal term used to refer to members of Generation Z. It combines the shorthand Boomer, referring to Baby Boomers, with the "Z" from Generation Z. Zoomer in its current incarnation skyrocketed in popularity in 2018, when it was used in a meme on 4chan mocking Gen Z adolescents via a Wojak caricature. Merriam-Webster's records suggest the use of the term Zoomer in the sense of Generation Z dates to at least as early as 2016. It was added to the Merriam-Webster dictionary in October 2021 and to Dictionary.com in January 2020. It is more commonly utilized as a neutral rather than disparaging description. In the past, Zoomer was occasionally used to describe particularly active Baby Boomers.

== Date and age range definitions ==
The Merriam-Webster Online Dictionary defines Generation Z as "the generation of people born in the late 1990s and early 2000s". The Oxford Dictionaries define Generation Z as "the group of people who were born between the late 1990s and the early 2010s, who are regarded as being very familiar with the internet". Encyclopedia Britannica defines Generation Z as "the term used to describe Americans born during the late 1990s and early 2000s. Some sources give the specific year range of 1997–2012, although the years spanned are sometimes contested or debated because generations and their zeitgeists are difficult to delineate."

The Pew Research Center specifies that 1997 is the starting birth year for Generation Z, based on the "different formative experiences" of this cohort, such as new technological and socioeconomic developments, as well as growing up in a world after the September 11 attacks. Pew has not specified an endpoint for Generation Z, but used 2012 as a tentative endpoint for their 2019 report. Most news outlets, management and consulting firms, think tanks, and analytics companies frequently use the starting birth year of 1997, often citing Pew Research's 1997–2012 range. (Note: Major news outlets using 1997 as the starting year include: The Wall Street Journal, citing Pew; PBS; NBC News, citing Pew; NPR, citing Pew; The New York Times; The Washington Post; CNBC; Bruce Tulgan writing for Forbes; Time Magazine; Associated Press, citing Brookings Institution; USA Today, citing Pew) (Note: Think tanks and analytics companies that use 1997 as their start date include: Gallup; William H. Frey of the Brookings Institution; Jason Dorsey of The Center for Generational Kinetics, citing Pew Research's 1997–2012 range in 2025; University of Southern California) (Note: Management and consulting firms citing Pew's 1997 range include: Accenture; Deloitte; McKinsey; PricewaterhouseCoopers; Ernst & Young; KPMG; Ipsos; Ogilvy) Statistics Canada used 1997 to 2012, citing Pew Research Center, in a 2022 publication analyzing the 2021 Canadian census. The United States Library of Congress uses 1997 to 2012, citing Pew Research as well. The U.S. Census designates Generation Z as "the youngest generation with adult members (born 1997 to 2013)" in a 2022 report.

The Collins Dictionary defines Generation Z as people born between the mid-1990s and mid-2010s. Australia's McCrindle Research uses 1995 to 2009 to define Gen Z. The Statistics Bureau of Japan defined Generation Z as those born 1995 to 2010 in their 2020 Census. In her book iGen (2017), psychologist Jean Twenge defines the "iGeneration" as the cohort born 1995 to 2012. The Australian Bureau of Statistics uses between 1996 and 2010 in a 2021 Census report.

Individuals born in the Millennial and Generation Z cusp years have been sometimes identified as a "microgeneration" with characteristics of both generations. The most common name given for these cuspers is Zillennials. Individuals born on the cusp of Generation Z and Generation Alpha have been referred to as Zalphas.

== Arts and culture ==
=== Happiness and personal values ===
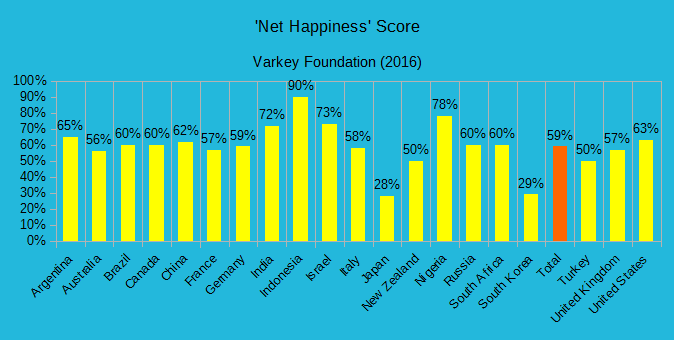

The Economist has described Generation Z as a more educated, well-behaved, stressed and depressed generation in comparison to previous generations. In 2016, the Varkey Foundation and Populus conducted an international study examining the attitudes of over 20,000 people aged 15 to 21 in twenty countries. They found that 59% of Gen Z youth were happy overall with the states of affairs in their personal lives. The most unhappy young people were from South Korea (29%) and Japan (28%), while the happiest were from Indonesia (90%) and Nigeria (78%).

The best sources of happiness were being physically and mentally healthy (94%), having a good relationship with family (92%), and with friends (91%). In general, respondents who were younger and male tended to be happier. Religious faith was purportedly the least happiness-inducing.

The top reasons for anxiety and stress were money (51%) and school (46%); social media and having access to basic resources (such as food and water) finished the list, both at 10%. Concerns over food and water were most serious in China (19%), India (16%), and Indonesia (16%); young Indians were also more likely than average to report stress due to social media (19%).

Important personal values of Gen Z are their families and themselves getting ahead in life (both 27%), followed by honesty (26%). Looking beyond their local communities came last at 6%. Familial values were especially strong in South America (34%) while individualism and the entrepreneurial spirit proved popular in Africa (37%). People who influenced youths the most were parents (89%), friends (79%), and teachers (70%). Celebrities (30%) and politicians (17%) came last. In general, young men were more likely to be influenced by athletes and politicians than young women, who preferred books and fictional characters. Celebrity culture was especially influential in China (60%) and Nigeria (71%) and particularly irrelevant in Argentina and Turkey (both 19%).

For young people, the most important factors for their current or future careers were the possibility of honing their skills (24%), and income (23%) while the most unimportant factors were fame (3%) and whether or not the organization they worked for made a positive impact on the world (13%). The most important factors for young people when thinking about their futures were their families (47%) and their health (21%); the welfare of the world at large (4%) and their local communities (1%) bottomed the list.

According to the 2025 World Happiness Report, young adults living the Anglosphere (Australia, Canada, Ireland, New Zealand, the United Kingdom, and the United States) were most prone to pessimism, a consequence of their deteriorating mental health and economic hardship.

=== Common culture ===
The COVID-19 pandemic struck when the oldest members of Generation Z were just joining the workforce and the rest were still in school. While Generation Z proved to be less resilient than older cohorts, their fundamental values did not change, and they remained open to change, such as the transition towards hybrid school and remote work. On average, Generation Z is more likely to value ambition, creativity, and curiosity than the general population, including Millennials.

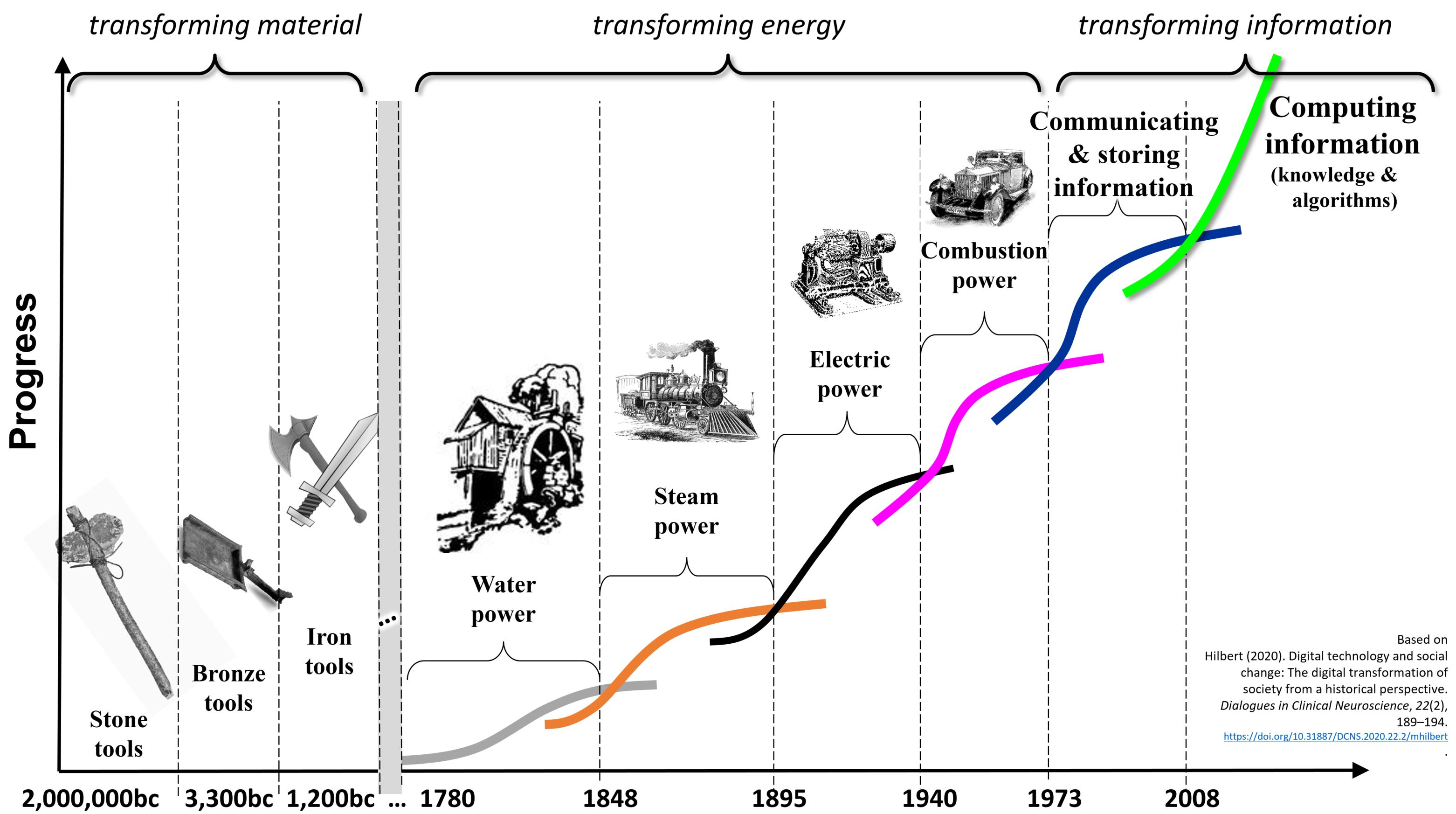
Generation Z comes of age during the Information Age, which has influenced not just their societies but also their lifestyle choices

Having a mobile device has become almost universal by the time the first wave of Generation Z reaches adolescence, to such an extent that it is common for them to feel uncomfortable or unsafe without one. But despite being digital natives, Generation Z also values in-person interactions and recognizes the limits of virtual communications. Among children and teenagers of the 2010s, much leisure time is spent watching television, reading, social networking, watching YouTube videos, and playing games on smartphones.

Many slang terms of Generations Z and Alpha—such as flex, no cap, slay, or shade—have their roots in African-American vernacular English, and, thanks to the Internet, spread much more rapidly than they otherwise would. Young people have historically used slang in order to be subversive, as such terms did not (yet) appear in the dictionary. However, this generation has been responsible for the rise of algospeak, or online slang terms and euphemisms to circumvent online content moderation while talking about certain sensitive topics, such as seggs (sex). Because modern youth culture is global rather than local, regional characteristics such as accent features or intonations have disappeared. The Internet has homogenized youth culture. In recognition of the Internet culture of Generations Z and Alpha, the Oxford English Dictionary chose brain rot as its word of the year in 2024.

During the early twenty-first century, youth subcultures have become quieter, at least in real life though not necessarily on the Internet, and more ridden with irony and self-consciousness due to the awareness of incessant peer surveillance. In Germany, young people are more interested in a more mainstream lifestyle with goals such as finishing school, owning a home in the suburbs, maintaining friendships and family relationships, and stable employment, rather than popular culture, glamour, or consumerism.

==== Nostalgia ====
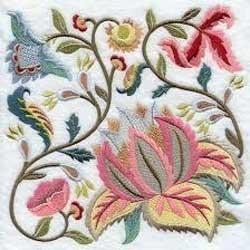
Floral prints are enjoying a revival in the 2020s thanks to Generation Z.

Boundaries between the different youth subcultures appear to have been blurred, and nostalgic sentiments have risen. Although nostalgia is normally associated with the elderly, this sentiment is now commonplace among those who came of age during the 2010s and 2020s. Struggling with present realities, Millennials and Generation Z long for the past, when life seemed simpler and less stressful, even if they have themselves never experienced it, a phenomenon known as anemoia. For example, although an aesthetic dubbed 'cottagecore' in 2018 has been around for many years, it has become a subculture of Generation Z, especially on various social media networks in the wake of the mass lockdowns imposed to combat the spread of COVID-19. It is a form of escapism and aspirational nostalgia. Nostalgic sentiments surged during and after the COVID pandemic. Vintage fashion, such as floral patterns and cardigans, is growing in vogue among Millennial and Generation Z consumers. Hobbies and other activities previously associated with the elderly, such as baking, knitting, bird watching, or vacationing on cruise ships, have returned to vogue among Generation Z. Furthermore, many Millennials and members of Generation Z are participating in certain activities that remind them of their carefree childhoods ("kidulting"), such as attending summer camps (for adults).

Spotify consumer data from 2022 suggests that Generation Z is most nostalgic for the 1980s. The Netflix science-fiction horror series Stranger Things (2016–2025), popular among Generation Z, has revived interest in American aesthetics from the 1980s when their parents, Generation X, were young. 1980s songs featured in the Stranger Things soundtracks became popular among Generation Z, including "Running Up That Hill" (1985) by Kate Bush, which has appeared in many TikTok videos. There is evidence that Generation Z is also nostalgic for the 1990s and 2000s, given the popularity of aesthetics such as grunge, Y2K, and Frutiger Aero among this cohort. Other trends of fashion and lifestyles among Generation Z include VSCO girl, E-girl and E-boy, Soft girl, and many others, which were made popular by TikTok, Instagram, Pinterest, influencers, and celebrities.

In Japan, Generation Z feels nostalgic for the Shōwa era (1926–1989), and they listen to the music of Akina Nakamori, Seiko Matsuda and Yōko Oginome. Also popular among Generation Z, both in and outside of the Home Islands, is Japanese music of 1970s and 1980s by artists such as Mariya Takeuchi and Masayoshi Takanaka.

==== Film, television, and music ====
Viewership for children's cable networks such as Disney Channel, Nickelodeon, and Cartoon Network, was strong in the mid- to late-2000s, when older Gen Z members were children. However, ratings began to fall in the early 2010s; Nickelodeon experienced a sharp double-digit decline by the end of 2011. This decline of linear television continued during the 2020s due to the rise of streaming services and social media. In Europe, public broadcasters, which receive some of their funding from license fees, face strong pressure partly due to the apathy of the young.

Generation Z continues to enjoy comfort television shows from the 1990s and 2000s, such as The Office (2005–2013) and Friends (1994–2004), watching them on Netflix rather than television. By the mid-2020s, Generation Z has become a major group of moviegoers. Global ticket sales during the opening weekend for the horror films Obsession (2025) and Backrooms (2026) mostly went to young adults, for whom the themes of social awkwardness, loneliness, and precariousness were highly relevant. North American viewers aged 18 to 34 brought almost two thirds of the tickets for the superhero film Spider-Man: Brand New Day (2026) during its opening weekend. The Odyssey (2026), an adaptation of the Homeric epic of the same name, and Michael (2026), a biopic of the late musician Michael Jackson, also drew large crowds of young viewers. Outside of the West, people under 34 are the majority of moviegoers in Vietnam, India, and Saudi Arabia. In Japan, young people helped give the animated film Demon Slayer: Infinity Castle (2025) the best opening weekend in their nation's history. The animated series Bluey (2018–present), though made for preschool children, has been surprisingly well-received among teenagers and young adults because it portrays family life positively and makes them feel nostalgic. It also helps many Millennials and members of Generation Z heal emotional wounds from their childhoods.

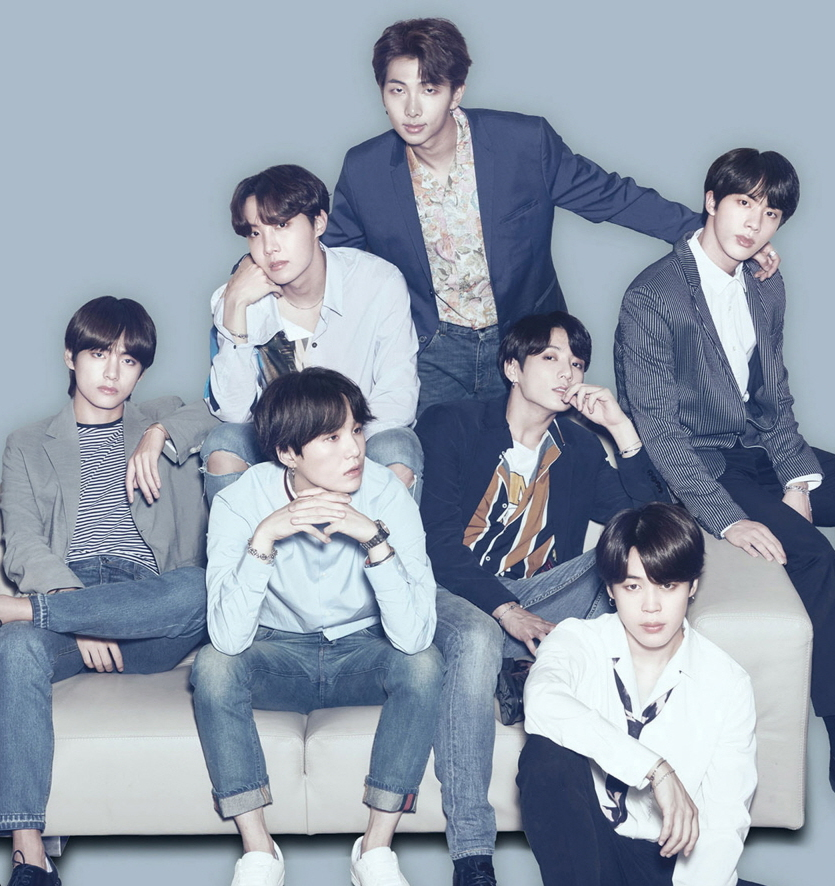
K-pop acts such as BTS are popular among members of Generation Z around the world.

For decades, Western popular culture had defined youth culture and rebelliousness around the world. But things changed with Generation Z, for whom East Asia is the source of cultural touchstones of the early twenty-first century. This cohort has a strong affinity for South Korean popular music (K-pop) and Japanese animations (anime), as indicated by the size of their fan communities and viewership rates. Furthermore, certain icons of East Asian popular culture have become political symbols for Gen-Z protesters. Global demand for anime is projected to continue growing until at least 2030 due to interest among young people. Anime songs appeal to Generation Z worldwide.

Generation Z has a plethora of options when it comes to music consumption, allowing for a highly personalized experience. Spotify and terrestrial radio are the top choices for music listening, while YouTube is the preferred platform for music discovery. In mid-2023, Spotify reported more growth than expected in the number of subscribers among Generation Z. Additional research showed that within the past few decades, popular music has gotten slower; that majorities of listeners young and old preferred older songs rather than keeping up with new ones; that the language of popular songs was becoming more negative psychologically; and that lyrics were becoming simpler and more repetitive, approaching one-word sheets, something measurable by observing how efficiently lossless compression algorithms (such as the LZ algorithm) handled them. On the other hand, texture and rhythm are becoming more complex. Streaming services have made it extremely easy for listeners to sample songs; this is putting pressure on musicians to compose songs that are as easy to process and have as many hooks as possible. Sad music is quite popular among adolescents, though it can dampen their moods, especially among girls.

==== Reading habits ====
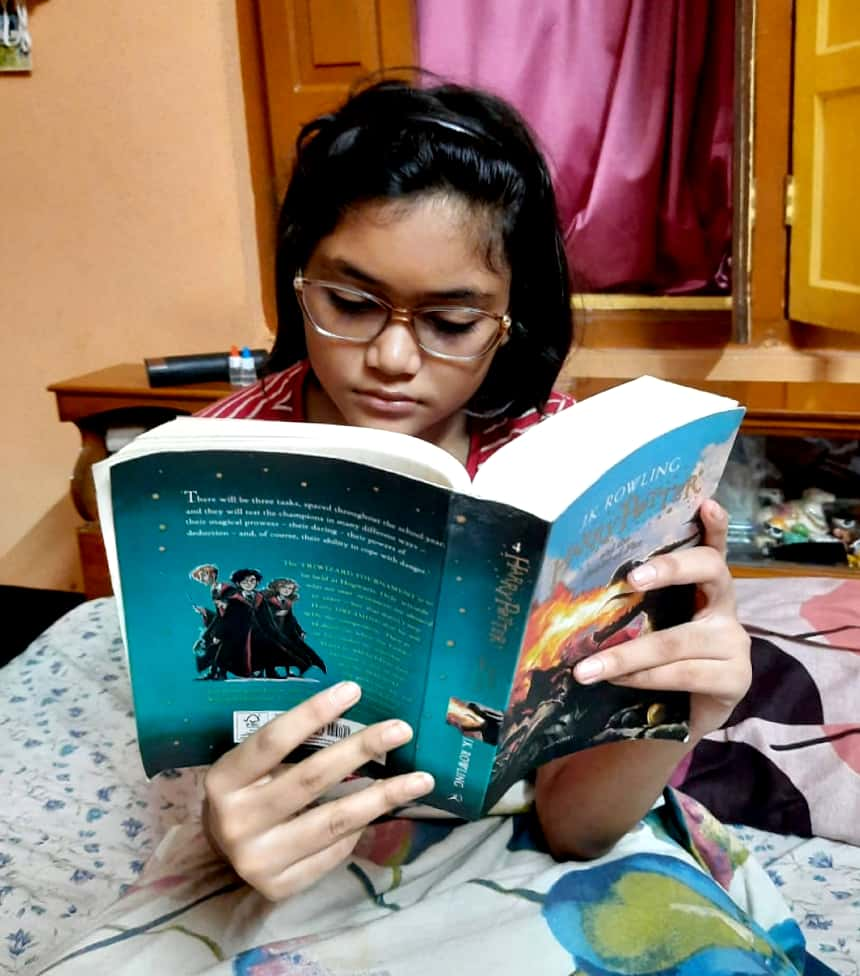
A teenage girl reading Harry Potter and the Goblet of Fire in 2023

According to a 2019 OECD survey, members of Generation Z were spending more time on electronic devices and less time reading books than before, with implications for their attention spans, vocabulary, academic performance, and future economic contributions.

In New Zealand, child development psychologist Tom Nicholson noted a marked decline in vocabulary usage and reading among schoolchildren, many of whom are reluctant to use the dictionary. According to a 2008 survey by the National Education Monitoring Project, about one in five year-four and year-eight pupils read books as a hobby, a ten-percent drop from 2000.

In the United Kingdom, children and teenagers of the 2010s reportedly spent more time playing video games and watching YouTube videos but less time reading. By 2022, Generation Z accounted for the majority of book purchases in that country. However, teenage girls are much more likely than boys to read for pleasure. About one in three children struggle with finding something interesting to read.

According to the Progress in International Reading Literacy Study (PIRLS), fourth graders in 2016, in 13 out of 20 countries and territories surveyed, were markedly less enthusiastic about reading than their predecessors in 2001 while their parents were even less keen on reading than they were.

Among members of Generation Z who read, romantic fantasy and Japanese comics (manga), such as One Piece (1997–present) and Naruto (1999–2014), are some of the most popular. Unlike older cohorts, they are fond of fan fiction and escapism. In particular, One Piece appeals to Generation Z because of the optimism, enthusiasm, and friendship of the main characters. In addition, BookTok, a community on TikTok, has many members from Generation Z, especially teenage girls and young women. BookTok has stimulated a revival of volitional reading among the young and a surge in book sales for publishers.

==== Fan fiction ====
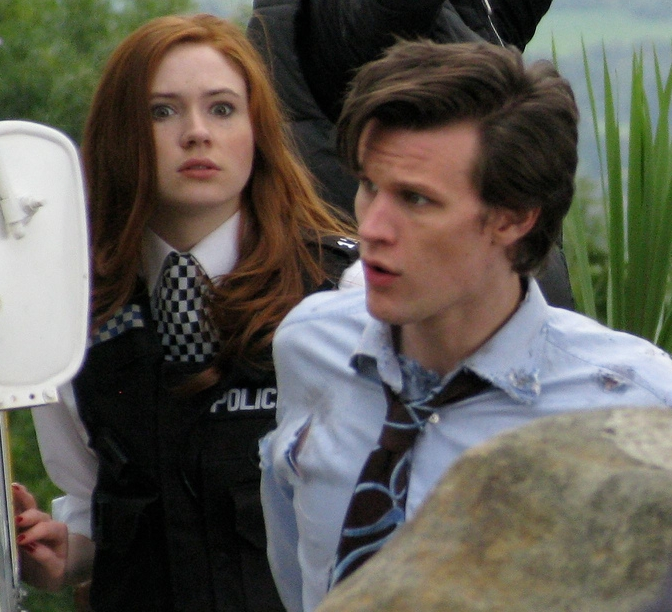
Karen Gillan (as Amy Pond) and Matt Smith (the Eleventh Doctor) on set for Doctor Who ("The Eleventh Hour"). Popular franchises such as Doctor Who have inspired numerous fan fiction stories written mostly by young female authors.

During the first two decades of the 21st century, writing and reading fan fiction and creating fandoms of fictional works became a prevalent activity worldwide. Demographic data from various depositories revealed that those who read and wrote fan fiction were overwhelmingly young, in their teens and twenties, and female. For example, an analysis published in 2019 by data scientists Cecilia Aragon and Katie Davis of the site FanFiction.Net showed that some 60 billion words of contents were added during the previous 20 years by 10 million English-speaking people whose median age was 15 1/2 years. Fan fiction writers base their work on various internationally popular cultural phenomena such as K-pop, anime, Star Trek, Harry Potter, Twilight, Star Wars, Doctor Who, One Direction, and My Little Pony, known as 'canon', as well as other things they considered important to their lives, like natural disasters. Much of fan fiction concerns the romantic pairing of fictional characters of interest, or 'shipping'. Aragon and Davis argued that writing fan fiction stories could help young people combat social isolation and hone their writing skills outside of school in an environment of like-minded people where they can receive (anonymous) constructive feedback, what they call 'distributed mentoring'. Informatics specialist Rebecca Black added that fan fiction writing could also be a useful resource for English-language learners. Indeed, the analysis of Aragon and Davis showed that for every 650 reviews a fan fiction writer receives, their vocabulary improved by one year of age, though this may not generalize to older cohorts. On the other hand, children browsing fan fiction contents might be exposed to cyberbullying, crude comments, and other inappropriate materials.

== Demographics ==
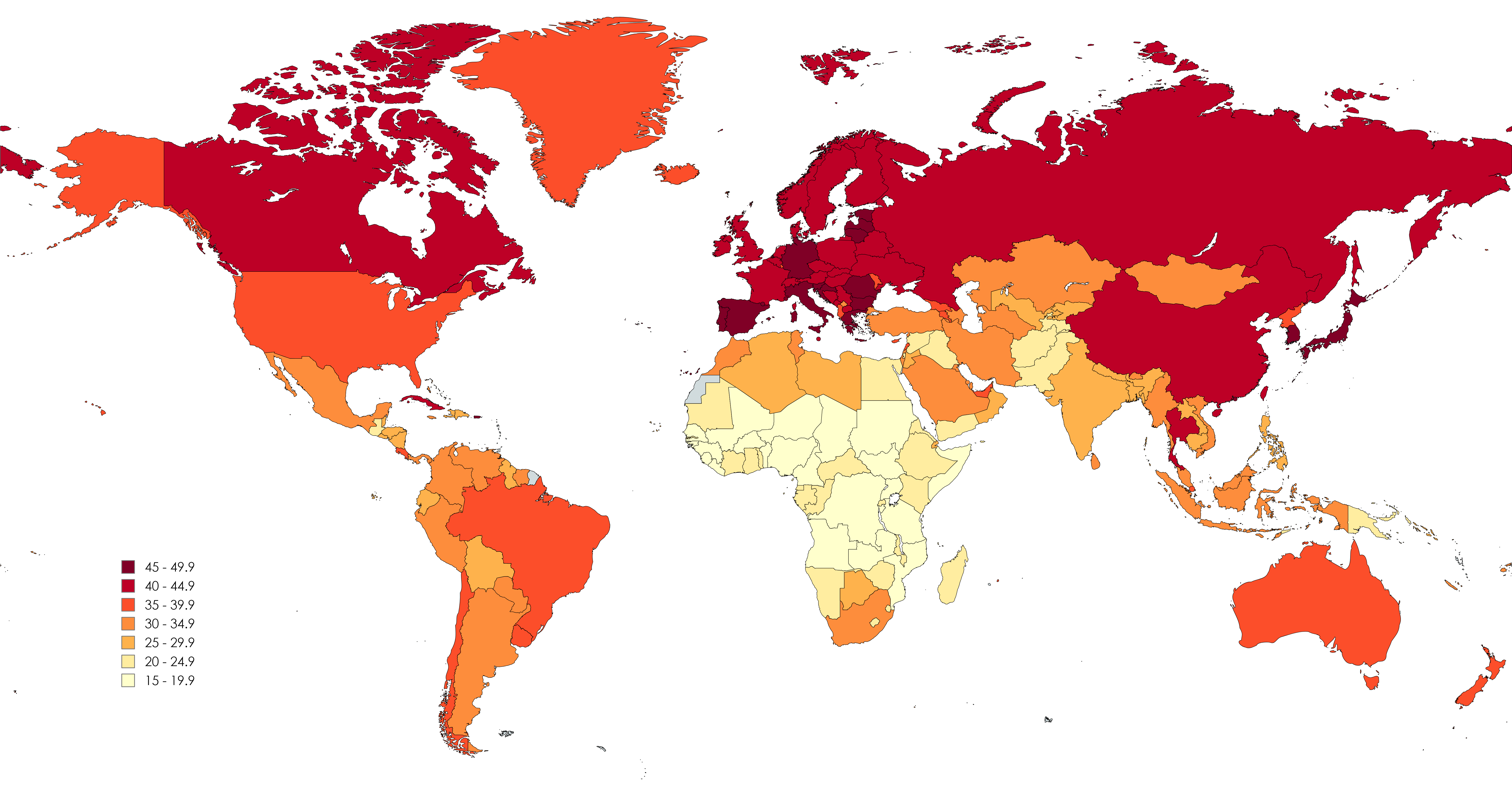
Median age by country in years in 2024. The youth bulge is evident in parts of Latin America, Africa, the Middle East and Southeast Asia.

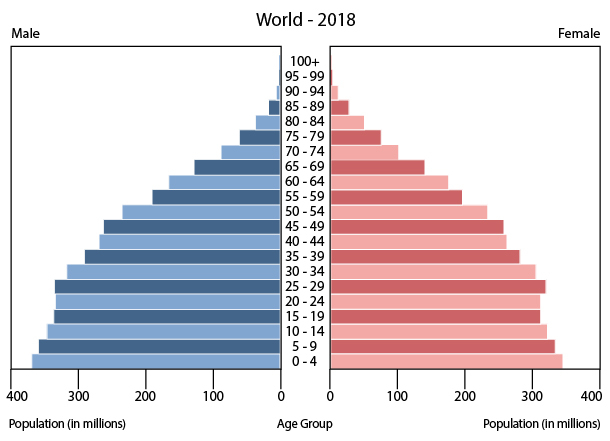
Population pyramid of the world in 2018

As of 2020, although many countries have aging populations and declining birth rates, Generation Z was the largest generation alive. Bloomberg's analysis of United Nations data predicted that, in 2019, members of Generation Z accounted for 2.47 billion (32%) of the 7.7 billion inhabitants of Earth, surpassing the Millennial population of 2.43 billion. The generational cutoff of Generation Z and Millennials for this analysis was placed at 2000 to 2001.

=== Africa ===
In 2018, Generation Z comprised the majority of the population of Africa. In 2017, 60% of the 1.2 billion people living in Africa fell below the age of 25.

In 2019, 46% of the South African population, or 27.5 million people, are members of Generation Z.

Statistical projections from the United Nations in 2019 suggest that, in 2020, the people of Niger had a median age of 15.2, Mali 16.3, Chad 16.6, Somalia, Uganda, and Angola all 16.7, the Democratic Republic of the Congo 17.0, Burundi 17.3, Mozambique and Zambia both 17.6. This means that more than half of their populations were born in the first two decades of the 21st century. These are the world's youngest countries by median age.

=== Asia ===
According to a 2022 McKinsey & Company insight, Generation Z will account for a quarter of the population of the Asia-Pacific region by 2025, and possess a global spending power of approximately US$140bn by 2030.

As a result of cultural ideals, government policy, and female modern medicine, there have been severe gender population imbalances in China and India. According to the United Nations, in 2018, there were 112 Chinese males for every hundred females ages 15 to 29; in India, there were 111 males for every hundred females in that age group. China had a total of 34 million excess males and India 37 million, more than the entire population of Malaysia. Together, China and India had a combined 50 million excess males under the age of 20. Such a discrepancy fuels loneliness epidemics, human trafficking (from elsewhere in Asia, such as Cambodia and Vietnam), and prostitution, among other societal problems.

Population pyramids of China, India, Japan, and Singapore in 2016

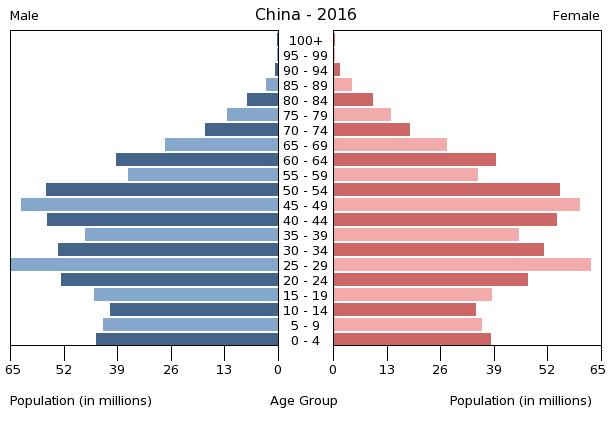

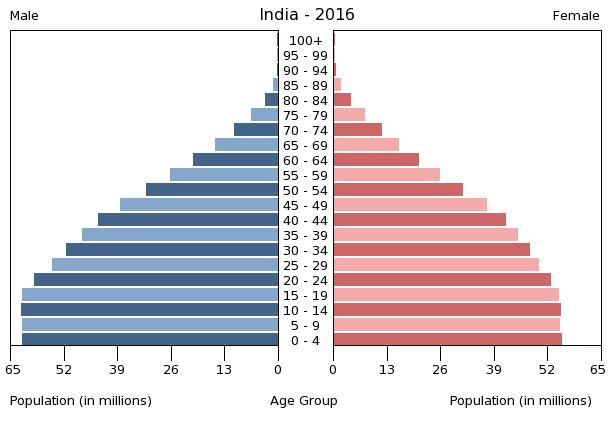

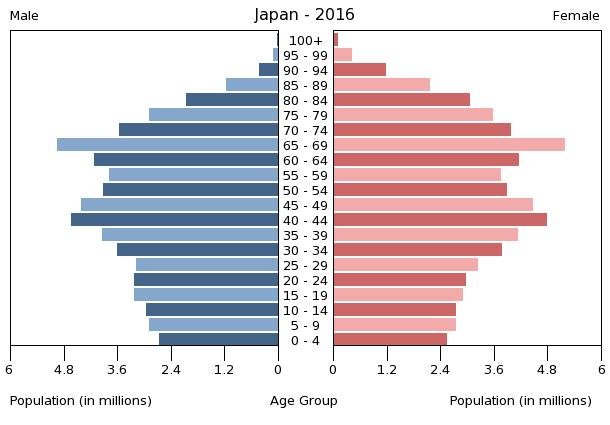

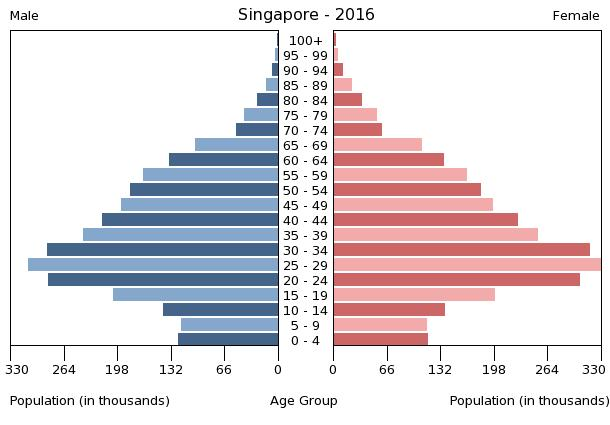

=== Europe ===
Out of the approximately 66.8 million people of the UK in 2019, there were approximately 12.6 million people (18.8%) in Generation Z, if defined as those born from 1997 to 2012.

Generation Z is the most diverse generation in the European Union in regards to national origin. In Europe generally, 13.9% of those ages 14 and younger in 2019 (which includes older Generation Alpha) were born in another EU Member State, and 6.6% were born outside the EU. In Luxembourg, 20.5% were born in another country, largely within the EU (6.6% outside the EU compared to 13.9% in another member state); in Ireland, 12.0% were born in another country; in Sweden, 9.4% were born in another country, largely outside the EU (7.8% outside the EU compared to 1.6% in another member state). In Finland, 4.5% of people aged 14 and younger were born abroad and 10.6% had a foreign-background in 2021. However, Gen Z from eastern Europe is much more homogeneous: in Croatia, only 0.7% of those aged 14 and younger were foreign-born; in the Czech Republic, 1.1% aged 14 and younger were foreign-born.

Higher portions of those ages 15 to 29 in 2019 (which includes younger Millennials) were foreign born in Europe. Luxembourg had the highest share of young people (41.9%) born in a foreign country. More than 20% of this age group were foreign-born in Cyprus, Malta, Austria and Sweden. The highest shares of non-EU born young adults were found in Sweden, Spain and Luxembourg. Like with those under age 14, countries in eastern Europe generally have much smaller populations of foreign-born young adults. Poland, Lithuania, Slovakia, Bulgaria and Latvia had the lowest shares of foreign-born young people, at 1.4 to 2.5% of the total age group.

Population pyramids of France, Greece, and Russia in 2016

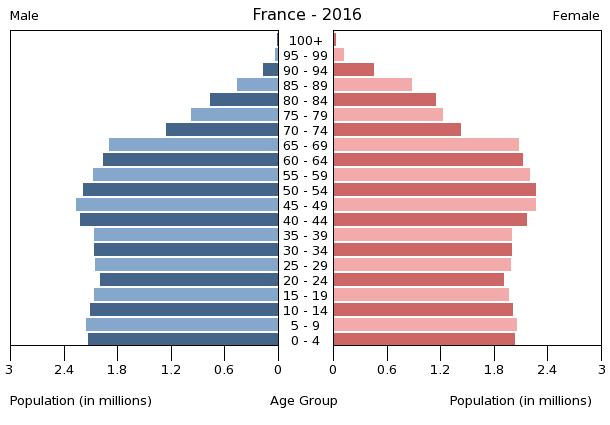

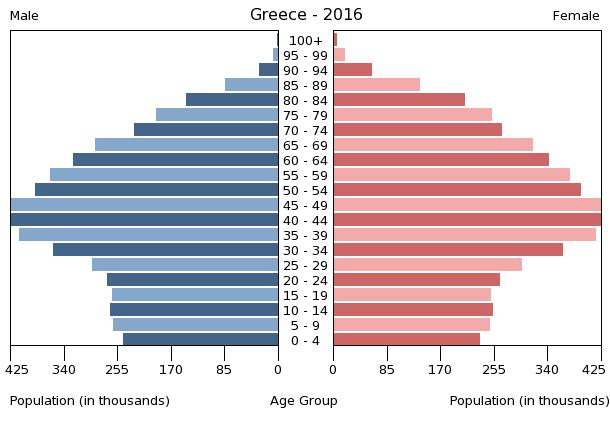

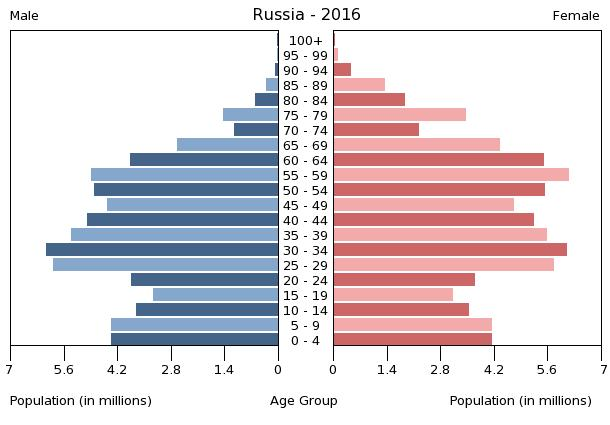

=== North America ===
Data from Statistics Canada published in 2017 showed that Generation Z comprised 17.6% of the Canadian population.

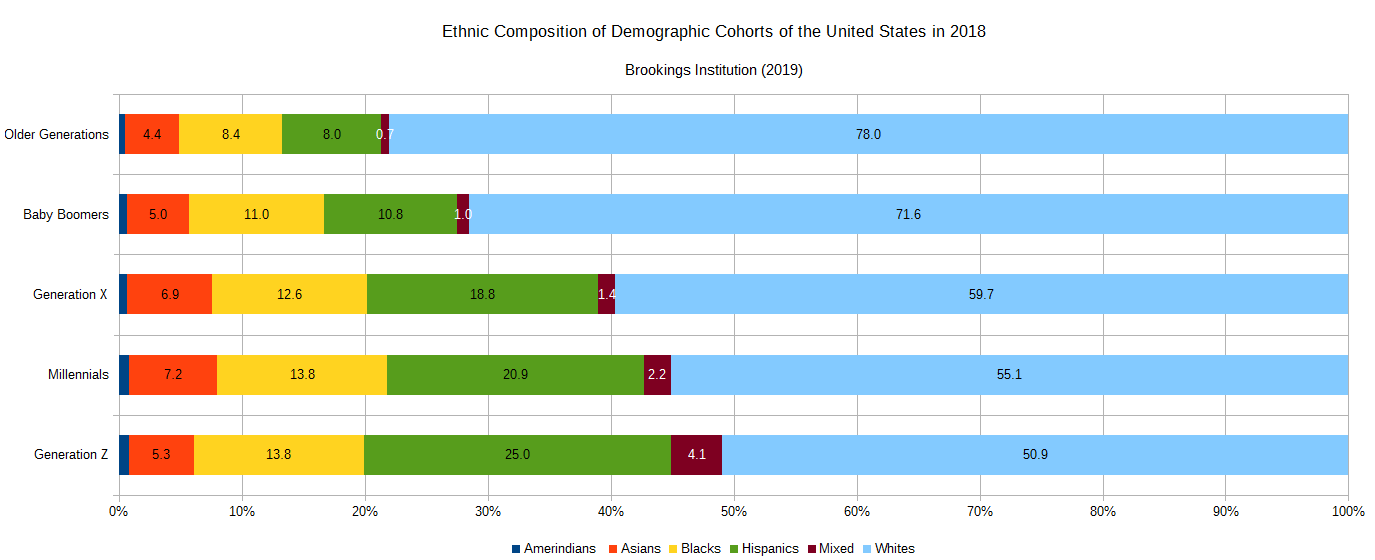

A report by demographer William Frey of the Brookings Institution stated that in the United States, the Millennials are a bridge between the largely white pre-Millennials (Generation X and their predecessors) and the more diverse post-Millennials (Generation Z and their successors). Frey's analysis of U.S. Census data suggests that as of 2019, 50.9% of Generation Z is white, 13.8% is black, 25.0% Hispanic, and 5.3% Asian. 29% of Generation Z are children of immigrants or immigrants themselves, compared to 23% of Millennials when they were at the same age.

Members of Generation Z are slightly less likely to be foreign-born than Millennials; the fact that more American Latinos were born in the U.S. rather than abroad plays a role in making the first wave of Generation Z appear better educated than their predecessors. However, researchers warn that this trend could be altered by changing immigration patterns and the younger members of Generation Z choosing alternate educational paths. As a demographic cohort, Generation Z is smaller than the Baby Boomers and their children, the Millennials. According to the U.S. Census Bureau, Generation Z makes up about one quarter of the U.S. population, as of 2015. There was an 'echo boom' in the 2000s; this boom certainly increased the absolute number of future young adults, but did not significantly change the relative sizes of this cohort compared to their parents.

According to a 2021 Gallup survey, 20.8%, or about one in five members, of Gen Z identify as LGBTQ+.

Population pyramids of Canada, the United States, and Mexico in 2016

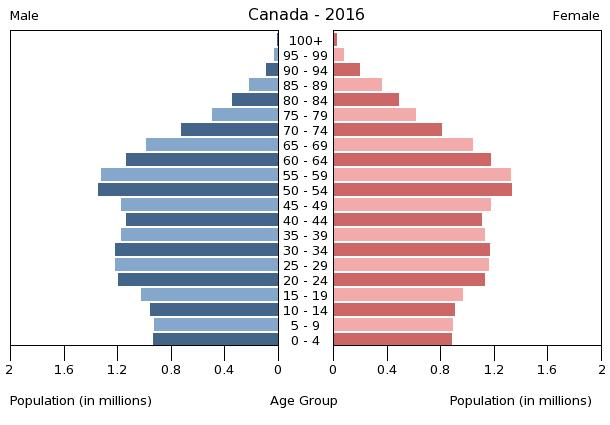

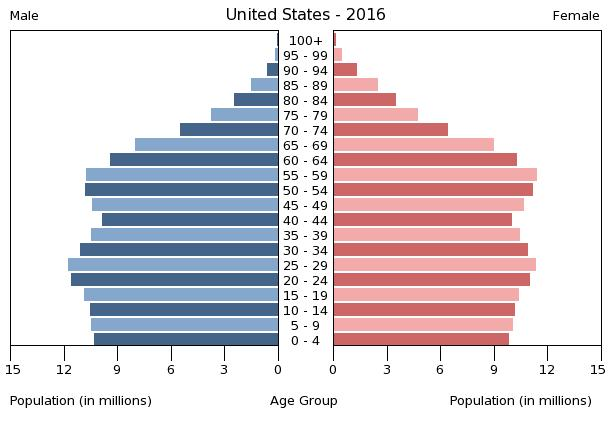

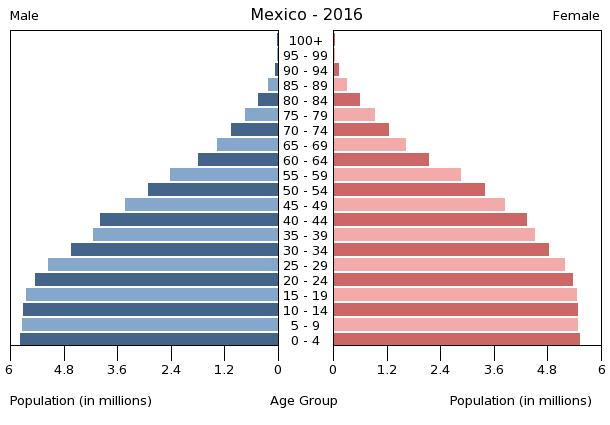

== Economic trends ==
=== Consumption ===
As consumers, members of Generation Z are typically reliant on the Internet to research their options and to place orders. They tend to be skeptical and will shun firms whose actions and values are contradictory. Their purchases are heavily influenced by trends promoted by "influencers" on social media, as well as the fear of missing out (FOMO) and peer pressure. The need to be "trendy" is a prime motivator. A 2020 survey conducted by the Center for Generational Kinetics, on 1,000 members of Generation Z and 1,000 Millennials, suggests that Generation Z still would like to travel, despite the COVID-19 pandemic and the recession it induced. However, Generation Z is more likely to look carefully for package deals that would bring them the most value for their money, as many of them are already saving money for buying a house and for retirement, and they prefer more physically active trips. Mobile-friendly websites and social-media engagements are both important. They take advantage of the Internet to market and sell their fresh produce.

In the West, while majorities might signal their support for certain ideals such as "environmental consciousness" to pollsters, actual purchases do not reflect their stated views, as can be seen from their high demand for cheap but not durable clothing ("fast fashion"), or preference for rapid delivery. Despite their socially progressive views, large numbers are still willing to purchase these items when human rights abuses in the developing countries that produce them are brought up. However, young Western consumers of this cohort are less likely to pay a premium for what they want compared to their counterparts from emerging economies. In China, young people have less disposable income than before due to a slowing economy. Even so, while they are saving money on basic necessities, they are willing to spend more money on hobbies or items that make them feel happy. In culturally modernizing Saudi Arabia, where 63% of the population was under the age of 30 as of 2024, luxury brands have seen growth in the market aimed at young consumers, most of whom make online purchases and prefer products that not only reflects their cultural heritage but are also modern.

In much of Western Europe, Generation Z faces economic stagnation or even falling standards of living. In the United Kingdom, Generation Z's general avoidance of alcohol and tobacco has noticeably reduced government revenue in the form of the sin tax. Indeed, many young Britons remain dependent on their parents to pay their bills in a stagnant economy and about a quarter spends virtually nothing on luxuries. In Canada, Generation Z has been accruing significant debt purchasing luxuries such as concert tickets (to other countries) or designer clothing despite its economic precariousness, a phenomenon dubbed "doom spending" by economists and described as a "trauma response" by psychotherapists. But in the United States, young people enjoy much better economic prospects. Due to their relatively high income, members of Generation Z in the U.S. have higher spending habits. According to new research, they rely on social media to make purchasing decisions, with health and beauty products being the most consumed category on these platforms.

As of the 2020s, an absolute majority of Gen-Z Latin Americans live in multi-person households, and for them, affordability is a constant worry.

==== Food and drink choices ====
In Central Eastern Europe, inflation and food insecurity have become a serious source of distress among university students. Due to the rising cost of living, young Canadians have been eating fast food less often. Instead, they are turning to buying groceries and cooking their own meals. However, they have also been accumulating significant (credit card) debt from frequently ordering food deliveries. In the United States, Generation Z has shown a high level of interest as well as vegetarian and vegan food options, including plant-based meat. Latin American youths typically enjoy nuts and classic bakery products, such as pan dulce.

Across the world, Generation Z is noticeably less keen on drinking alcoholic beverages compared to the Baby Boomers, partly as a consequence of public-health warnings. In Australia, for instance, monthly consumption by people aged 18 to 24 halved between the early 2010s and early 2020s. In France, farmers in the Bordeaux regions have been replacing their grape vines with other crops due to cratering demand for alcohol among the young. In Latin America, coffee and soft drinks are the preferred drinks of Generation Z. This does not mean that Generation Z is boycotting alcohol altogether, however. Some members of this cohort are looking for quality and novelty.

==== Transportation choices ====
Across the developed world, young people are noticeably less likely to get a driver's license or to own a car than older generations. This new trend is driven by the possibility of making online purchases, economic constraints, concerns for the environment, viability of alternatives to driving (walking, biking, public transit, and ride sharing), and growing restrictions on driving within urban areas. In the United States, however, decades of auto-centric urban development have led to under-investment in walkable neighborhoods, bicycle lanes, and public transit, making it likely that most members of Generation Z will eventually become frequent drivers, like the Millennials before them, even if they dislike cars.

=== Employment ===
According to the International Labor Organization (ILO), the COVID-19 pandemic has amplified youth unemployment, but unevenly. By the mid-2020s, about a quarter of young people worldwide were neither in employment, in education, or training (NEET). From the developed world to developing countries, many struggle to make a living in low-pay low-productivity jobs while dealing with high inflation. The International Monetary Fund (IMF) considers this global trend to pose not just a social risk but also a macroeconomic one that threatens the future of today's youths.

In the early 2020s, Chinese youths are finding that their university degrees offer little help in job hunting. In fact, due to the mismatch between education and the job market, those with no university qualifications are less likely to be unemployed. By June 2023, China's unemployment rate for people aged 16 to 24 was about one fifth. In South Korea, people below the age of 40 are increasingly interested in relocating from the cities, especially Seoul, to the countryside and working on the farm. Working in a conglomerate like Samsung or Hyundai Group no longer appeals to young people, many of whom prefer to avoid becoming a workaholic or are pessimistic about their ability to be as successful as their fathers. In South and Southeast Asia, while there has been considerable economic growth, large numbers of young adults remain without jobs, especially in Indonesia, Nepal, and Bangladesh.

In a number of Western countries, the number of young adults who were NEET or stay-at-home parents has grown significantly between the 2010s and 2020s. In Australia, Generation Z is much more likely to report feeling stress, fatigue, and occupational burnout compared to older cohorts. In the United Kingdom, Generation Z is facing a gig economy with precarious prospects and stagnant wages. However, according to a 2026 report from the Resolution Foundation, British Gen-Z workers are earning more at age 24 than any generation since the 50s, with pay 12% higher than millennials at the same age. Many young Europeans with high skills are leaving their home countries for places that offer more job opportunities, higher salaries, and lower taxes; they typically choose another country in Europe with a stronger economy or the United States.

In Canada, people aged 15 to 24 faced an unemployment rate of 12.2%, or more than twice that of prime working-age adults, as of 2025. Among university students, that number was over one fifth, the highest since the Great Recession of the late 2000s. Young graduates face not only a tough labor market, but also global trade wars, persistent inflation, industrial automation and artificial intelligence. In the United States, the youth unemployment rate (16–24) was 7.5% in May 2023, the lowest in 70 years. American high-school graduates could join the job market right away, with employers offering them generous bonuses, high wages, and apprenticeship programs in order to offset the ongoing labor shortage. Generation Z in the United States as a group is projected to be richer than previous generations at the same age thanks to higher wage growth and greater inheritance from their parents and grandparents, who have accumulated enormous wealth.

As of 2023, members of Generation Z in North America and especially developing Asian nations were a much more optimistic about their economic prospects and more likely to believe in the value of hard work than their counterparts in developed Asia, Western Europe, or Latin America. As workers, Generation Z tends to prioritize a financial security, meaning, and their own well-being. They also value a work–life balance.

=== Housing ===
For large swaths of Generation Z in the developed Anglosphere, home ownership remains a distant prospect. Due to opposition from local property owners, who view their homes not just as a place to live in but also a tool for wealth accumulation, new homes have not been built at a pace fast enough to satisfy demand, leading to critical shortages and high prices. This has had a demoralizing effect on young people in the English-speaking world, making them less willing to work hard and save money.

== Education ==
East Asian and Singaporean students consistently earned the top spots in international standardized tests in the 2010s and 2020s. Globally, reading comprehension and numeracy have been declining. The OECD's Program for International Student Assessment (PISA) tests administered in 2022 unveiled the continuation of a long-term decline in reading and mathematical skills since the early 2010s. In other words, the COVID-19 pandemic was only one contributing factor. Even so, fifteen-year-old students (tenth graders) from Singapore, Macau, Hong Kong, Taiwan, South Korea, and Japan were largely unaffected or even saw an improvement. Once high-performing European countries—Iceland, Sweden, and Finland—continued their years-long decline. The U.S. national average remained behind those of many other industrialized nations.

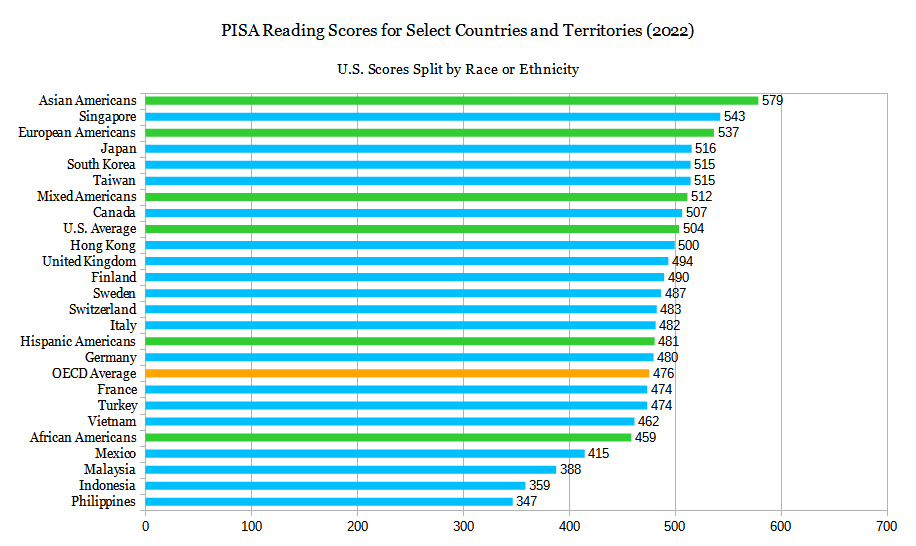

By 2024, many places around the world have decided to ban the use of mobile phones in the classroom to help their students concentrate better.

Different nations and territories approach the question of how to nurture gifted students differently. During the 2000s and 2010s, whereas the Middle East and East Asia (especially China, Hong Kong, and South Korea) and Singapore actively sought them out and steered them towards top programs, Europe and the United States had in mind the goal of inclusion and chose to focus on helping struggling students. In 2010, for example, China unveiled a decade-long National Talent Development Plan to identify able students and guide them into STEM fields and careers in high demand; that same year, England dismantled its National Academy for Gifted and Talented Youth and redirected the funds to help low-scoring students get admitted to elite universities. Developmental cognitive psychologist David Geary observed that Western educators remained "resistant" to the possibility that even the most talented of schoolchildren needed encouragement and support and tended to concentrate on low performers. In addition, even though it is commonly believed that past a certain IQ benchmark (typically 120), practice becomes much more important than cognitive abilities in mastering new knowledge, recently published research papers based on longitudinal studies, such as the Study of Mathematically Precocious Youth (SMPY) and the Duke University Talent Identification Program, suggest otherwise.

As of the 2020s, young women have outnumbered men in higher education across the developed world, reversing a historical trend. At the same time, the number of men in their 20s who are in neither education, employment, or training (NEET) has been rising. In France and the United Kingdom, this number has surpassed that of women.

Since the early 2000s, the number of students from emerging economies going abroad for higher education has risen markedly. This was a golden age of growth for many Western universities admitting international students. In the late 2010s, around five million students traveled abroad each year for higher education, with the developed world being the most popular destinations and China the biggest source of international students. In 2019, the United States was the most popular destination for international students, with 30% of its international student body coming from mainland China, Australia, Canada, the United Kingdom, and Japan. Among children of the Chinese ruling class ("princelings"), attending elite institutions in the United States was commonplace and seen as a status symbol, but the deterioration of Sino-American relations as exemplified by President Donald Trump's entry restrictions on Chinese students in addition to the complications produced by the COVID-19 pandemic reduced the number of Chinese students enrolling in many American colleges and universities. But even before the pandemic, undergraduate and graduate enrollments of native-born American citizens have both been in decline, while trade schools continue to attract growing numbers of students due to a shortage of high-skilled blue-collar workers. Since the 2000s, numerous institutions of higher learning have permanently closed. These trends have led to the speculation that the higher-education bubble in the United States might deflate. But among the top colleges and universities, there is still growth in the number of applicants. This is due partly to students sending their applications to more schools for a chance of getting admitted and because these institutions have not significantly expanded their capacities. Although international enrollments rebounded post-pandemic, with a surge of students coming from India and sub-Saharan Africa, dependency on foreign students is a long-term liability for many American schools, which now face a political zeitgeist that has turned against immigration. Meanwhile, in Canada, the government has cut the number of international student visas granted each year in response to growing public disapproval of current levels of immigration. The same thing happened in Australia.

Because China's expansion of higher education was done for political rather than economic reasons, the country is currently overproducing university graduates, who are struggling to find white-collar jobs that match their education. In 2023, as many as one in five Chinese graduates struggled to find gainful employment. Enrollment in higher education was just under 60% during the early 2020s, compared to around 40% in the United States. In response, the government has recommended that students and their families consider vocational training programs to fill factory jobs.

== Health issues ==
=== Mental ===
In general, teenagers and young adults are especially vulnerable to depression and anxiety due to the changes to the brain during adolescence. While materially well off, young people today commonly perceive the world in which they live to be highly precarious, complex, and ambiguous, which has a negative effect on their mental well-being. A 2025 survey found that 46% of American Generation Z members had been diagnosed with a mental health condition.

A 2020 meta-analysis found that the most common psychiatric disorders among adolescents were ADHD, anxiety disorders, behavioral disorders, and depression, consistent with a previous one from 2015. Data from the World Health Organization (WHO) and the Program for International Student Assessment (PISA) indicate that while the percentages of teenagers reporting mental-health issues (such as psychological distress and loneliness) remained approximately the same during the 2000s, they steadily increased during the 2010s. While the COVID-19 pandemic has damaged the mental health of people of all ages, the increase was most noticeable for people aged 15 to 24. A 2021 UNICEF report stated that 13% of ten- to nineteen-year-olds around the world had a diagnosed mental health disorder and that suicide was the fourth most common cause of death among fifteen- to nineteen-year-olds. It commented that "disruption to routines, education, recreation, as well as concern for family income, health and increase in stress and anxiety, [caused by the COVID-19 pandemic] is leaving many children and young people feeling afraid, angry and concerned for their future." It also noted that the pandemic had widely disrupted mental health services. Anxiety over climate change has compounded the problem. Though males remain more likely than females to commit suicide, the prevalence of suicide among teenage girls has risen significantly during the 2010s in many countries. For example, data from the British National Health Service (NHS) showed that in England, hospitalizations for self-harm doubled among teenage girls between 1997 and 2018, but there was no parallel development among boys.

In some Western countries—Australia, the Netherlands, Spain, the United Kingdom, and parts of the United States—intervention programs have been set up to prevent depression among teenagers. However, funding has been limited.

==== Sleep deprivation ====
Sleep deprivation is on the rise among contemporary youths, due to a combination of poor sleep hygiene, caffeine intake, beds that are too warm, a mismatch between biologically preferred sleep schedules at around puberty and social demands, insomnia, growing homework load, and having too many extracurricular activities. Consequences of sleep deprivation include low mood, worse emotional regulation, anxiety, depression, increased likelihood of self-harm, suicidal ideation, and impaired cognitive functioning. In addition, teenagers and young adults who prefer to stay up late tend to have high levels of anxiety, impulsivity, alcohol intake, and tobacco smoking. A study by Glasgow University found that the number of schoolchildren in Scotland reporting sleep difficulties increased from 23% in 2014 to 30% in 2018. 37% of teenagers were deemed to have low mood (33% males and 41% females), and 14% were at risk of depression (11% males and 17% females). Older girls faced high pressure from schoolwork, friendships, family, career preparation, maintaining a good body image and good health.

In Canada, teenagers sleep on average between 6.5 and 7.5 hours each night, much less than what the Canadian Paediatric Society recommends, 10 hours. According to the Canadian Mental Health Association, only one out of five children who needed mental health services received it. In Ontario, for instance, the number of teenagers getting medical treatment for self-harm doubled in 2019 compared to ten years prior. The number of suicides has also gone up. Various factors that increased youth anxiety and depression include over-parenting, perfectionism (especially with regards to schoolwork), social isolation, social-media use, financial problems, housing worries, and concern over some global issues such as climate change.

==== Cognitive abilities ====
In many countries, Generation Z youth are more likely to be diagnosed with intellectual disabilities and psychiatric disorders than older generations.

A 2010 meta-analysis by an international team of mental health experts found that the worldwide prevalence of intellectual disability (ID) was around one percent. But the share of individuals with such a condition in low- to middle-income countries were up to twice as high as their wealthier counterparts. The researchers also found that ID was more common among children and adolescents than adults. A 2020 literature review and meta-analysis confirmed that the incidence of ID was indeed more common than estimates from the early 2000s.

In 2013, a team of neuroscientists from the University College London published a paper on how neurodevelopmental disorders can affect a child's educational outcome. They found that up to 10% of the human population have specific learning disabilities or about two to three children in a (Western) classroom. Such conditions include dyscalculia, dyslexia, attention deficit hyperactivity disorder (ADHD), and autism spectrum disorder. A 2017 study from the Dominican Republic suggests that students from all sectors of the educational system utilize the Internet for academic purposes, yet those from lower socioeconomic backgrounds tend to rank the lowest in terms of reading comprehension skills.

A 2020 report by psychologist John Protzko analyzed over 30 studies and found that children have become better at delaying gratification over the previous 50 years, corresponding to an average increase of 0.18 standard deviations per decade on the IQ scale. This is contrary to the opinion of the majority of the 260 cognitive experts polled (84%), who thought this ability was deteriorating. Researchers test this ability using the Marshmallow Test. Children are offered treats: if they are willing to wait, they get two; if not, they only get one. The ability to delay gratification is associated with positive life outcomes, such as better academic performance, lower rates of substance use, and healthier body weights. Possible reasons for improvements in the delaying gratification include higher standards of living, better-educated parents, improved nutrition, higher preschool attendance rates, more test awareness, and environmental or genetic changes. Some other cognitive abilities, such as simple reaction time, color acuity, working memory, the complexity of vocabulary usage, and three-dimensional visuospatial reasoning have shown signs of secular decline.

In a 2018 paper, cognitive scientists James R. Flynn and Michael Shayer argued that the observed gains in IQ during the 20th century—commonly known as the Flynn effect—had either stagnated or reversed, as can be seen from a combination of IQ and Piagetian tests. In the Nordic nations, there was a clear decline in general intelligence starting in the 1990s, an average of 6.85 IQ points if projected over 30 years. In Australia and France, the data remained ambiguous; more research was needed. In the United Kingdom, young children experienced a decline in the ability to perceive weight and heaviness, with heavy losses among top scorers. In German-speaking countries, young people saw a fall in spatial reasoning ability but an increase in verbal reasoning skills. In the Netherlands, preschoolers and perhaps schoolchildren stagnated (but seniors gained) in cognitive skills. What this means is that people were gradually moving away from abstraction to concrete thought. On the other hand, the United States continued its historic march towards higher IQ, a rate of 0.38 per decade, at least up until 2014. South Korea saw its IQ scores growing at twice the average U.S. rate. The secular decline of cognitive abilities observed in many developed countries might be caused by diminishing marginal returns due to industrialization and to intellectually stimulating environments for preschoolers, the cultural shifts that led to frequent use of electronic devices, the fall in cognitively demanding tasks in the job market in contrast to the 20th century, and possibly dysgenic fertility.

=== Physical ===
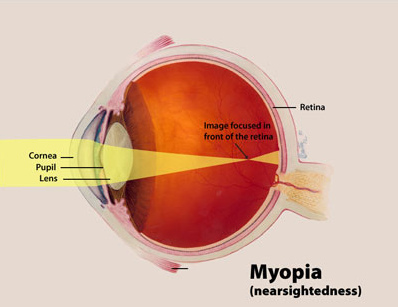
Anatomical diagram of myopia, or nearsightedness

A 2015 study found that the frequency of nearsightedness has doubled in the United Kingdom within the last 50 years. Ophthalmologist Steve Schallhorn, chairman of the Optical Express International Medical Advisory Board, noted that research has pointed to a link between the regular use of handheld electronic devices and eyestrain. The American Optometric Association sounded the alarm in a similar vein. According to a spokeswoman, digital eyestrain, or computer vision syndrome, is "rampant, especially as we move toward smaller devices and the prominence of devices increase in our everyday lives." Symptoms include dry and irritated eyes, fatigue, eye strain, blurry vision, difficulty focusing, headaches. However, the syndrome does not cause vision loss or any other permanent damage. To alleviate or prevent eyestrain, the Vision Council recommends that people limit screen time, take frequent breaks, adjust the screen brightness, change the background from bright colors to gray, increase text sizes, and blinking more often. Parents should not only limit their children's screen time but should also lead by example.

While food allergies have been observed by doctors since ancient times and virtually all foods can be allergens, research by the Mayo Clinic in Minnesota found they have been growing increasingly common since the early 2000s. Today, one in twelve American children has a food allergy, with peanut allergy being the most prevalent type. Reasons for this remain poorly understood. Nut allergies in general have quadrupled and shellfish allergies have increased 40% between 2004 and 2019. In all, about 36% of American children have some kind of allergy. By comparison, this number among the Amish in Indiana is 7%. Allergies have also risen ominously in other Western countries. In the United Kingdom, for example, the number of children hospitalized for allergic reactions increased by a factor of five between 1990 and the late 2010s, as did the number of British children allergic to peanuts. In general, the better developed the country, the higher the rates of allergies. Reasons for this remain poorly understood. One possible explanation, supported by the U.S. National Institute of Allergy and Infectious Diseases, is that parents keep their children "too clean for their own good". They recommend exposing newborn babies to a variety of potentially allergenic foods, such as peanut butter before they reach the age of six months. According to this "hygiene hypothesis", such exposures give the infant's immune system some exercise, making it less likely to overreact. Evidence for this includes the fact that children living on a farm are consistently less likely to be allergic than their counterparts who are raised in the city, and that children born in a developed country to parents who immigrated from developing nations are more likely to be allergic than their parents are.

A research article published in 2019 in the journal The Lancet reported that the number of South Africans aged 15 to 19 being treated for HIV increased by a factor of ten between 2010 and 2019. This is partly due to improved detection and treatment programs. However, less than 50% of the people diagnosed with HIV went onto receive antiviral medication due to social stigma, concerns about clinical confidentiality, and domestic responsibilities. While the annual number of deaths worldwide due to HIV/AIDS has declined from its peak in the early 2000s, experts warned that this venereal disease could rebound if the world's booming adolescent population is left unprotected.

Data from the Australian Bureau of Statistics reveal that 46% of Australians aged 18 to 24, about a million people, were overweight in 2017 and 2018. That number was 39% in 2014 and 2015. Obese individuals face higher risks of type II diabetes, heart disease, osteoarthritis, and stroke. The Australian Medical Associated and Obesity Coalition have urged the federal government to levy a tax on sugary drinks, to require health ratings, and to regulate the advertisement of fast foods. In all, the number of Australian adults who are overweight or obese rose from 63% in 2014–15 to 67% in 2017–18.

=== Puberty in girls ===
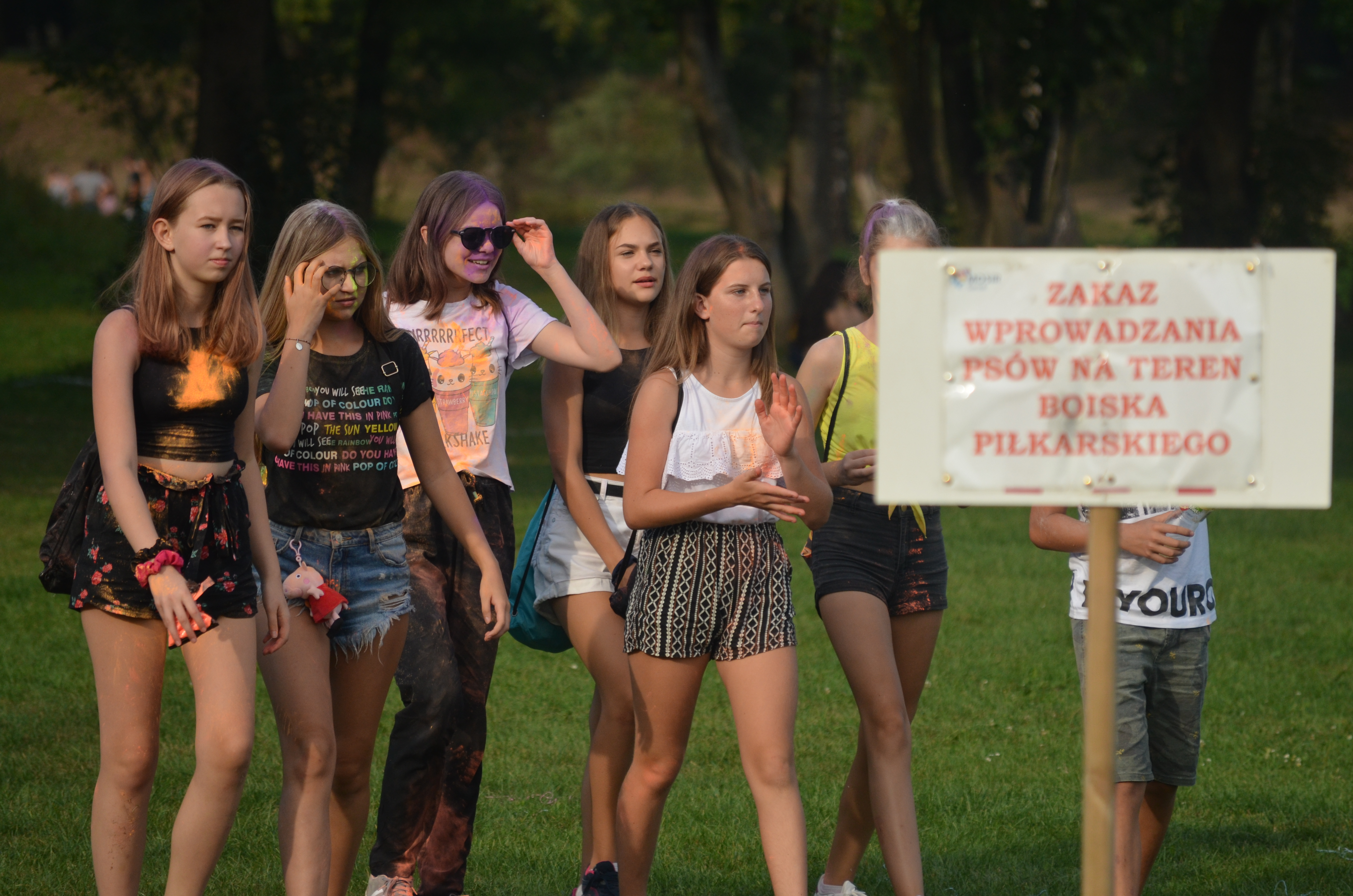
Some teenage girls enjoying the end of summer in Poland (2019). Pubertal onset has become sooner around the world.

Globally, there is evidence that girls in Generation Z experienced puberty at considerably younger ages compared to previous generations, with implications for their welfare and their future. The prevalence of allergies among adolescents and young adults in this cohort is greater than in the general population.

In Europe and the United States, the average age of the onset of puberty among girls was around 13 in the early 21st century, down from about 16 a hundred years earlier. Early puberty is associated with a variety of mental health issues, such as anxiety and depression (as people at this age tend to strongly desire conformity with their peers), early sexual activity, substance use, tobacco smoking, eating disorders, and disruptive behavioral disorders. Girls who mature early also face higher risks of sexual harassment. Moreover, in some cultures, pubertal onset remains a marker of readiness for marriage, for, in their point of view, a girl who shows signs of puberty might engage in sexual intercourse or risk being assaulted, and marrying her off is how she might be 'protected'. To compound matters, factors known for prompting mental health problems are themselves linked to early pubertal onset; these are early childhood stress, absent fathers, domestic conflict, and low socioeconomic status. Possible causes of early puberty could be positive, namely improved nutrition, or negative, such as obesity and stress. Other triggers include genetic factors, high body-mass index (BMI), exposure to endocrine-disrupting substances that remain in use, such as Bisphenol A (found in some plastics) and dichlorobenzene (used in mothballs and air deodorants), and to banned but persistent chemicals, such as dichlorodiphenyl-trichloroethane (DDT) and dichlorodiphenyldichloroethylene (DDE), and perhaps a combination thereof (the 'cocktail effect').

A 2019 meta-analysis and review of the research literature from all inhabited continents found that between 1977 and 2013, the age of pubertal onset among girls has fallen by an average of almost three months per decade, but with significant regional variations, ranging from 10.1 to 13.2 years in Africa to 8.8 to 10.3 years in the United States. This investigation relies on measurements of thelarche (initiation of breast tissue development) using the Tanner scale rather than self-reported menarche (first menstruation) and MRI brain scans for signs of the hypothalamic-pituitary-gonadal axis being reactivated. Furthermore, there is evidence that sexual maturity and psychosocial maturity no longer coincide; 21st-century youth appears to be reaching the former before the latter. Neither adolescents nor societies are prepared for this mismatch. (Note: More broadly, contemporary human females are evolving to reach menarche earlier and menopause later compared to their ancestral counterparts. See Human evolution from the Early Modern Period to the present.)

== Political views and participation ==
=== Views and votes ===
As a group, Generation Z in Western countries was on the left of politics, but has shifted right since 2020. Moreover, there is a significant gender gap: Gen-Z women are more likely to support left-wing movements than their male counterparts. Polling on immigration receives mixed responses from Generation Z.

Among developed democracies, young people's faith in institutions, including government, has declined compared to previous generations. Among respondents aged 15–29, trust in their governments was the lowest in Greece, Italy, the US, the UK, and South Korea, and highest in New Zealand, Ireland, Finland, Lithuania, and Switzerland. In many European nations, the economic crises of the late 2000s and early 2010s have shaken young voters' faith in the welfare state, which they view as something that mostly benefits old people. In Australia, where voting is compulsory, members of Generation Z feel alienated by mainstream politics; approximately half vote only to avoid a fine.

In tandem with more members of Generation Z being able to vote in elections during the late 2010s and early 2020s, the youth vote has increased in Europe and the US. In Australia, Millennials and Generation Z outnumbered the Baby Boomers as voters by the 2025 federal election. By the mid-2020s, young adults on both sides of the North Atlantic have demonstrated a willingness to vote for the populist right. In Europe, voters from Generation Z swung from favoring the Greens in the 2019 European Parliament elections to supporting parties of the (far) right in 2024. In the US, while Generation Z might still support some left-wing causes like Millennials, they have shifted noticeably right since 2020 as their priorities change. Polls consistently showed the Democratic Party hemorrhaging support among young adults during the late 2010s and early 2020s, even though they largely disapprove of the Republican Party. By the early 2020s, young voters in Europe became increasingly concerned about the rising cost of living, violent crime, declining public services, immigration, and the Russo-Ukrainian War. In Canada, voters under 30 are most worried about the housing shortage, the cost of living, and crime rates; they, especially men, favored the Conservatives by a sizeable margin in 2025. In the US, the single most important issue for Generation Z is the economy (including inflation; housing costs, healthcare, and higher education; income inequality; and taxes). Political scientist Jean-Yves Camus dismissed the stereotype of young people altruistically voting for green or left-wing parties as outdated. Living as young adults in what they perceive as a volatile world, they crave security. Compared to older cohorts, young voters of the 2020s have grown up with dimmer economic prospects and are more likely to think of life as a zero-sum competition for scarce resources and opportunities. Multinational polls conducted in the early 2020s reveal that with Generation Z, the age-old pattern of younger cohorts holding more liberal or progressive sociopolitical views than their elders is no longer true in general. Nevertheless, in Australia, not only does Generation Z start out as more liberal than their predecessors when they were at the same age, they also do not transition towards conservatism at the same rate as they get older.

The trends above conceal a significant gender divide across the West, with young women (under 30) being left-leaning and young men right-leaning on a variety of issues from immigration to sexual harassment. Young men and women are willing to vote for politically extreme parties or candidates. In the UK, while young adults are broadly left-leaning, young women are more likely to support the Green Party. In the US, although most male Zoomers voted for Donald Trump in 2024, young women were split. Some individuals who support gender equality are hesitant to identify as "feminist" because there are different interpretations of what the term represents. Furthermore, the backlash against feminism among young men is strong in many countries; older men tend to hold similar views to women across age groups on this topic. Significant numbers of Gen-Z men support traditional gender roles, believe that it is much harder to be a man today, and that women's emancipation has gone too far and come at their expense. This political sex gap has been noticeable since the 2000s, but has widened since the mid-2010s. This growing difference has also been observed among young adults in China and South Korea. Across the West, young men's socioeconomic status has been on the decline relative to young women's, something certain online influencers such as Andrew Tate exploit to cultivate in their followers a zero-sum mindset and resentment for women. Anti-feminist circles—the manosphere—have attracted large numbers of Gen-Z men in Australia and South Korea. This polarization of the sexes is exacerbated by social media.

Politically engaged members of Generation Z are more likely than their elders to avoid buying from, or working for, companies that do not share their politics, and they take advantage of the Internet as activists. Consequently, maintaining a presence on social media networks, especially TikTok, is vital for politicians and political parties dependent upon the youth vote, such as the Left (Die Linke) and the Alternative for Germany (AfD), the two most popular German political parties among young voters in the 2025 federal election. Social media are platforms through which those on the margins of politics can directly address the public, eroding the advantages of establishment figures. 2025 proved to be a turning point in Australian politics as the three major political parties—the Labor Party, the Liberal-National Coalition, and the Green Party—all spent considerable resources campaigning on TikTok, vying for youth support. For their part, members of Generation Z are also influenced by the political views of the people they follow on social media.

=== Protests and riots ===
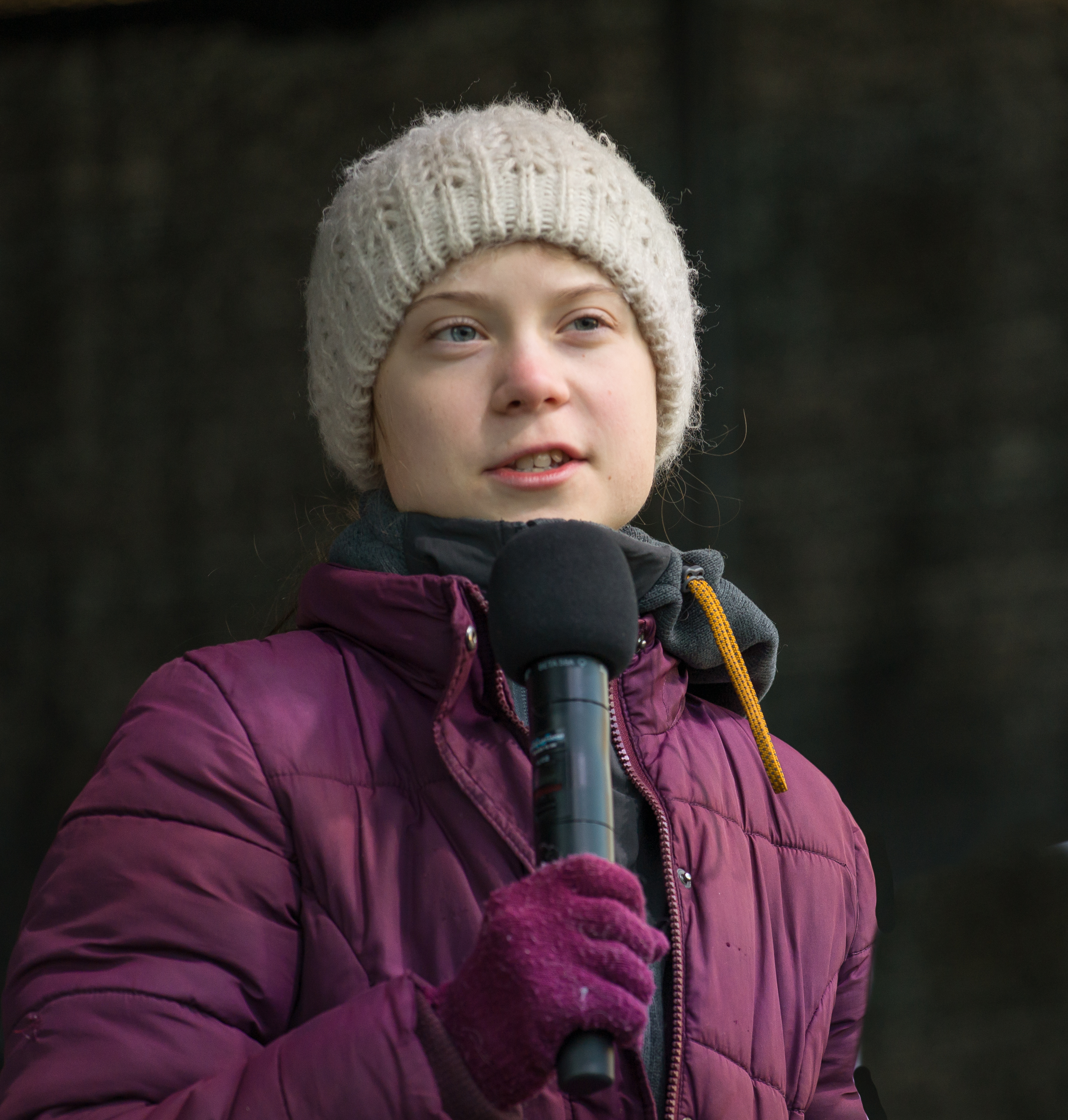
Greta Thunberg, a climate activist born in Sweden in 2003, led the September 2019 climate strikes around the world.

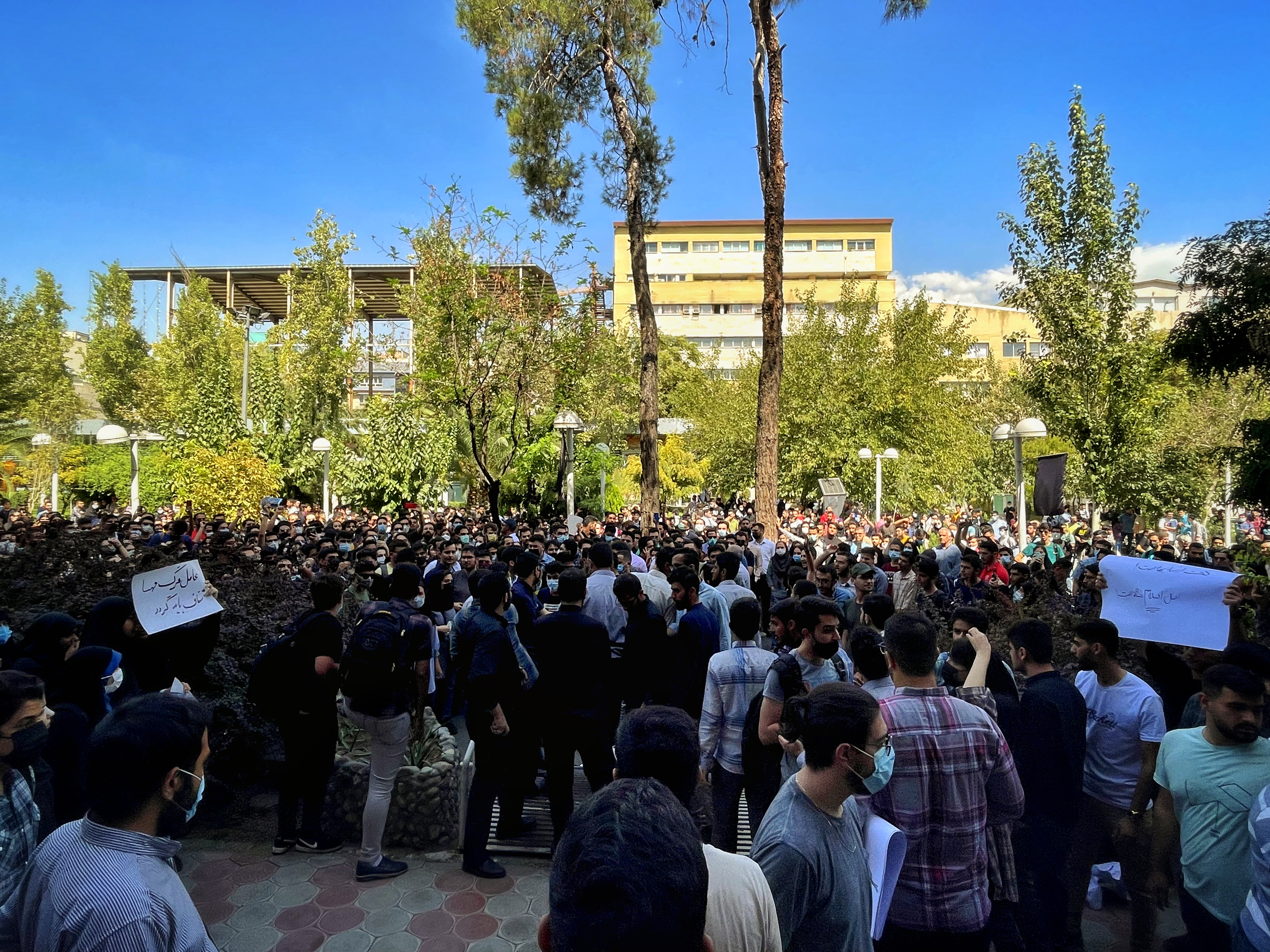
Amirkabir University of Technology students protest against the hijab and the government in the aftermath of the death of Mahsa Amini at the hands of the Iranian morality police for allegedly violating the hijab code in 2022.

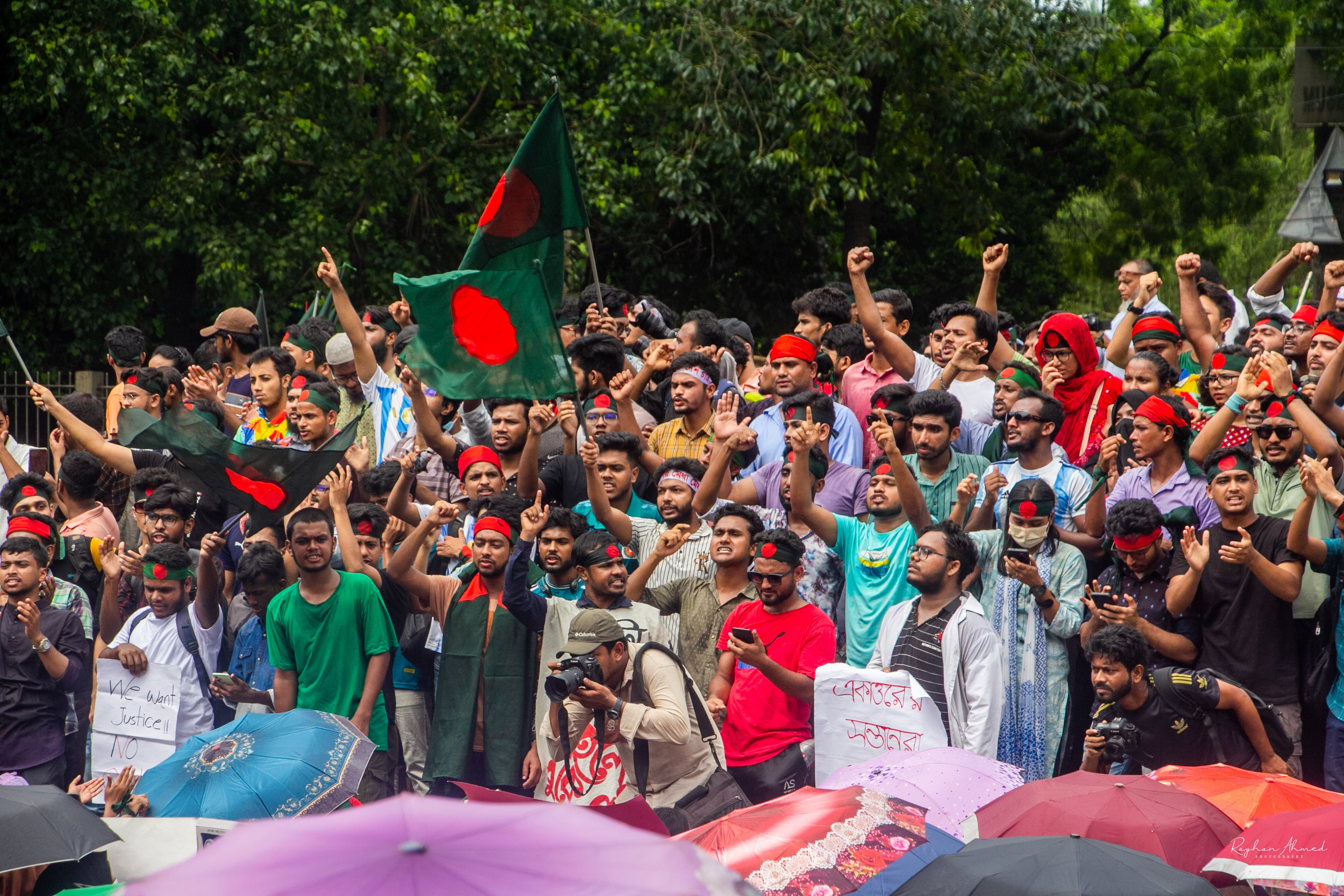
Bangladesh's Student–People's uprising in 2024 has been dubbed the world's first successful Generation Z–led revolution, ending Sheikh Hasina's 15-year-long autocratic rule.

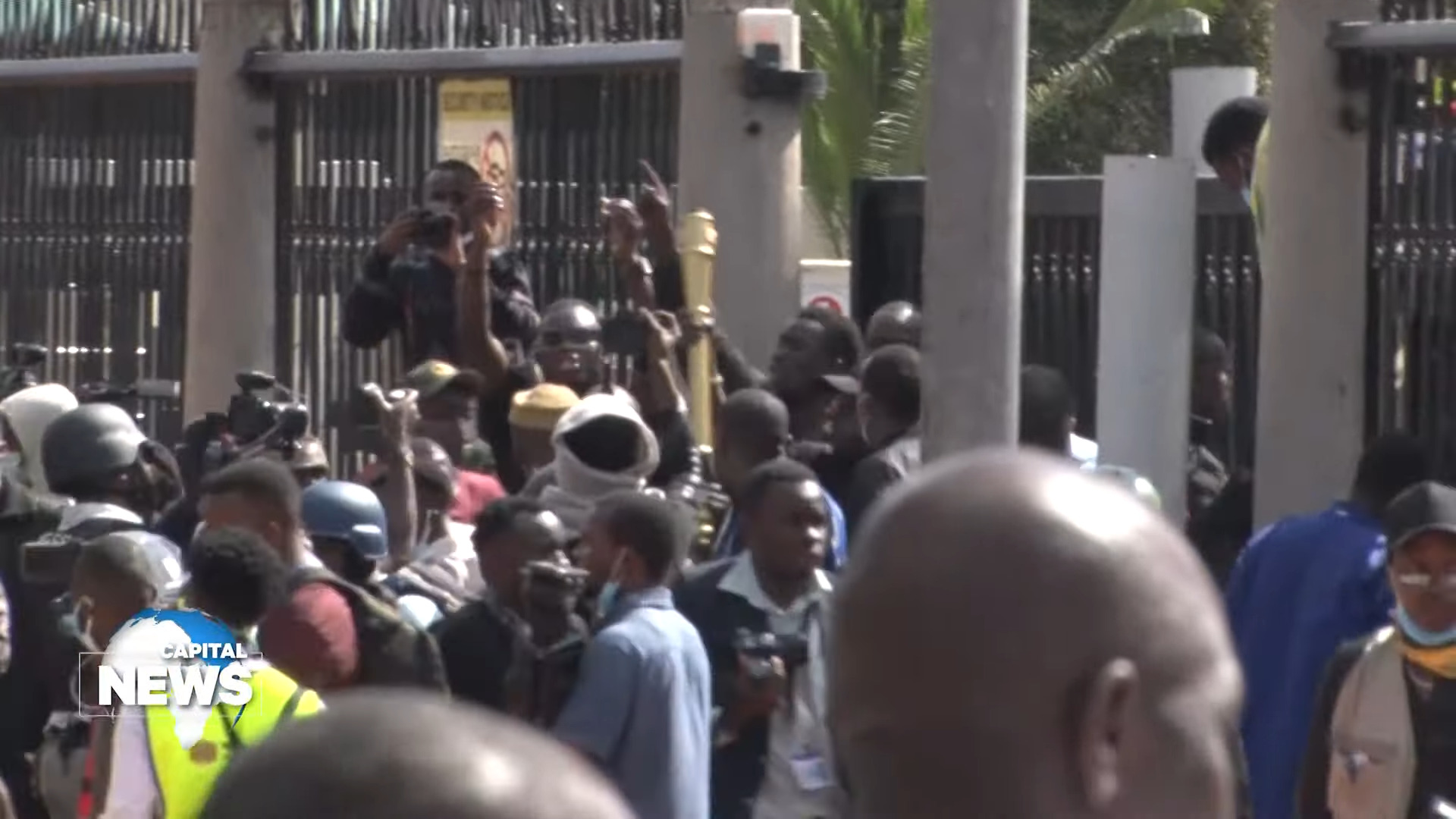
Gen-Z Kenyans take to the streets to protest a tax hike in 2024.

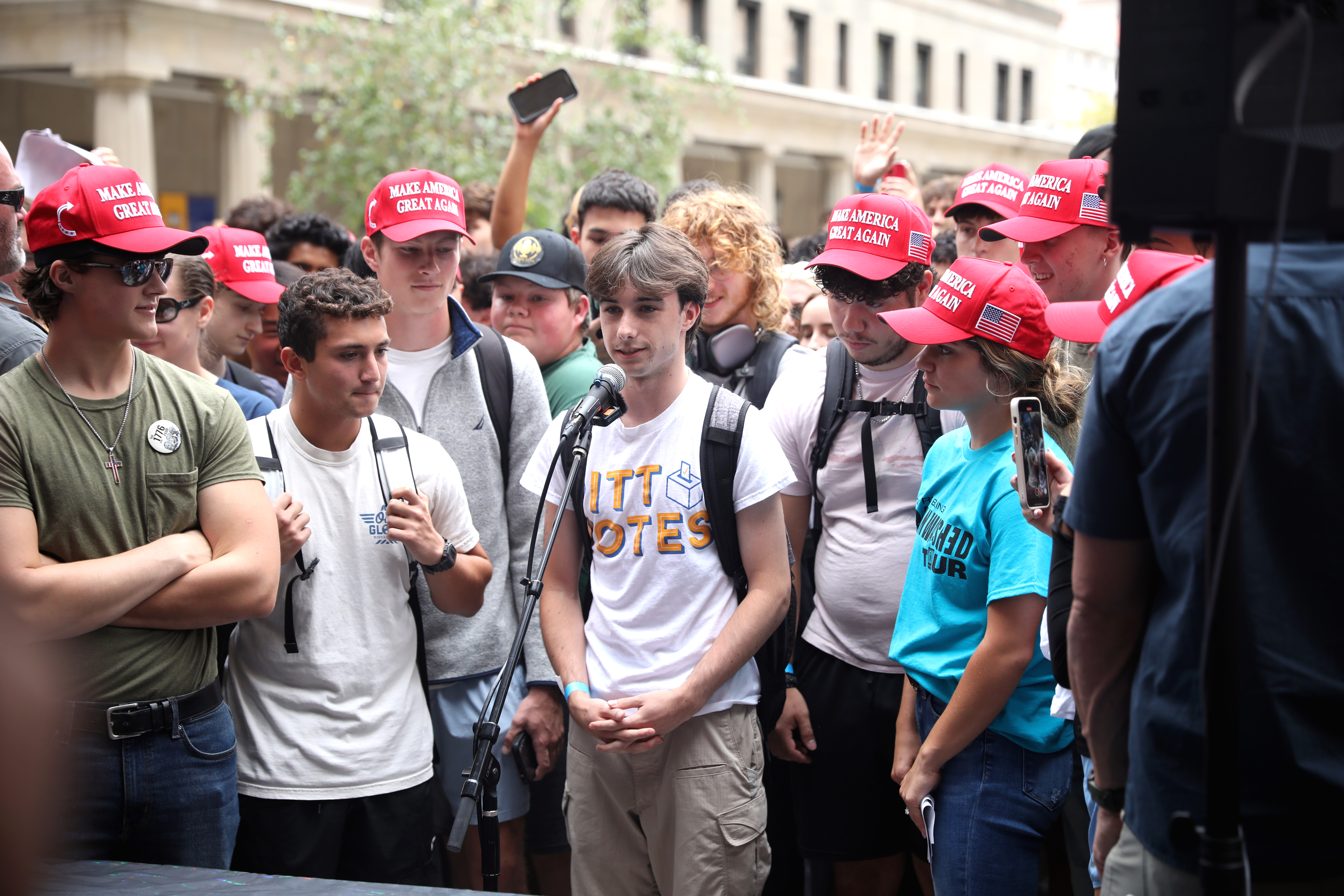
Young Americans, seen here with Make America Great Again (MAGA) hats at a 2024 event, have shifted towards the political right since 2020.

An early political movement primarily driven by Generation Z was School Strike for Climate of the late 2010s. The movement involved millions of young people around the world who followed the footsteps of Swedish activist Greta Thunberg to skip school in order to protest in favor of greater action on climate change. Around the world, large numbers of people from this cohort feel angry, anxious, guilty, helpless, and sad about climate change and are dissatisfied with how their governments have responded so far. However, their consumption choices (see above) reveal a gap between their stated values and their activism.

Generation Z continues to be highly active in politics during the 2020s. In Iran, activists, most of whom women, took to the streets in 2022 to voice their disapproval of their government after 22-year-old Mahsa Amini died in morality police custody; she was arrested for allegedly violating the state's Islamic dress code. In Bangladesh, students overthrew the autocratic regime of Prime Minister Sheikh Hasina in the July Revolution of 2024, putting an end to what they deemed an unfair quota system of the Bangladeshi civil service and a massacre. In Kenya, young people, long faced with government corruption and economic precariousness despite being better educated than older generations, protested the 2024 tax hikes of President William Ruto.

In 2025, Generation Z took to the streets of Nepal to protest a ban on social media platforms (which was later lifted) and the extravaganza and nepotism of the ruling class; they also toppled the communist government of Prime Minister Sharma Oli. This cohort also demonstrated to voice their disapproval of their governments' corruption and economic mismanagement in Indonesia and the Philippines, taking advantage of social media to organize and plan their events. In Morocco, Generation Z organized civil disobedience on Discord in response to inadequate public services, high unemployment, and high government spending on the 2030 FIFA World Cup. In Madagascar, a coup by Generation Z, who felt upset by water and power shortages, unemployment, and the dilapidated state of universities, paved the way for Colonel Michael Randrianirina to declare himself the interim president. In Peru, the president was impeached following mass unrest in response to an unpopular pension reforms and violent crime. In 2025, Bulgaria became the first European nation whose government was felled by members of Generation Z, who were upset by years of government dysfunction and corruption. Protests in one country in many cases have inspired those in other places, facilitated by social media platforms. In all, with the notable exceptions of the United States and Israel, developing countries with low median ages—that is, youth bulges—are most at risk of a major protest by Generation Z.

In many protests of Generation Z in the 2020s, the Straw Hat Pirates' Jolly Roger from the manga series One Piece has become an international symbol of solidarity. This flag was first used in the protests in Indonesia, but has since been spotted in Morocco, Peru, the Philippines, Nepal, and Mexico. In South Korea, K-pop music, such as the song "Into the New World" (2007) by Girls' Generation was used in anti-corruption protests of 2016–17, despite its largely apolitical lyrics. It was also used in pro-democratic rallies in Hong Kong in 2019–20 as well as in Thailand in 2020-21.

== Religious tendencies ==
In the Middle East and North Africa, young people were much more pious in the early 2020s compared to the late 2010s.

Young Latin Americans of the 2020s are markedly more likely to be irreligious than the previous decade, making their region as a whole more secular. Those with higher education are especially likely to be religiously unaffiliated. Nevertheless, belief in astrology and spirituality remained common.

There is a significant gender gap in certain countries, such as Australia, Finland, and the United States, where religion now attracts more young men than women. In Sweden, the number of youths who attended a church service throughout the year doubled between 2020 and 2024, rising from 17% to 34%; the increase was found among both native and immigrant Swedes.

Data from the British Social Attitudes Survey indicates that between the late 2010s and the mid-2020s, there has been an overall decline in the number of British adults attending church at least once a month. Compared with the national average, religious attendance among Britons aged 18 to 34 was even lower. According to British Office for National Statistics (ONS), people under the age of 40 in England and Wales are more likely to consider themselves irreligious rather than Christian, as of 2023.

In Canada, 43% of people aged 15 to 35 were religiously unaffiliated in 2021. Young Canadian adults, who are much more likely to have higher education than their counterparts in other countries of the OECD in the 2020s, tend to have a negative opinion of religion, viewing it as incompatible with modernity. In the United States, Generation Z is overall the least religious generation in history, though many of them still describe themselves as spiritual. Although the long-term decline of religion has slowed during the 2020s, the generational shift in religiosity remains palpable. The United States saw one of the fastest declines of religion between the late 2000s and early 2020s, behind only Greece and Italy. Millennials and Generation Z are driving the trend. Young women are leaving religion at a faster pace than young men, and have become less religious than young men, breaking a historical norm. Atheism is more common among Generation Z than in prior generations.

== Risky behaviors ==
=== Adolescent pregnancy ===

Adolescent pregnancy has been in decline during the early 21st century all across the industrialized world, due to the widespread availability of contraception and the growing avoidance of sexual intercourse among teenagers. In the European Union and the United Kingdom, teenage parenthood has fallen 58% and 69%, respectively, between the 1990s and the 2020s. In New Zealand, the pregnancy rate for females aged 15 to 19 dropped from 33 per 1,000 in 2008 to 16 in 2016. Highly urbanized regions had adolescent pregnancy rates well below the national average whereas Māori communities had much higher than average rates. In Australia, it was 15 per 1,000 in 2015. In the United States, teenage pregnancy rates continued to decline, reaching 13.5 in 2022, the lowest on record. Northern European countries, above all the Netherlands, have some of the world's lowest teenage pregnancy and abortion rates by implementing thorough sex education.

=== Alcoholism and substance use ===
2020 data from the UK Office for National Statistics (ONS) showed on a per-capita basis, members of Generation Z binged on alcohol 20% less often than Millennials. However, 9.9% of people aged 16 to 24 consumed at least one drug in the past month, usually cannabis, or more than twice the share of the population between the ages of 16 and 59. "Cannabis has now taken over from the opiates in terms of the most people in treatment for addiction," psychopharmacologist Val Curran of the University College London (UCL) told The Telegraph. Moreover, the quality and affordability of various addictive drugs have improved in recent years, making them an appealing alternative to alcoholic beverages for many young people, who now have the ability to arrange a meeting with a dealer via social media. Addiction psychiatrist Adam Winstock of UCL found using his Global Drug Survey that young people rated cocaine more highly than alcohol on the basis of value for money, 4.8 compared to 4.7 out of 10.

As of 2019, cannabis was legal for both medical and recreational use in Uruguay, Canada, and 33 states in the US. In the United States, Generation Z is the first to be born into a time when the legalization of marijuana at the federal level is being seriously considered. While adolescents (people aged 12 to 17) in the late 2010s were more likely to avoid both alcohol and marijuana compared to their predecessors from 20 years before, college-aged youths are more likely than their elders to consume marijuana. Marijuana use in Western democracies was three times the global average, as of 2012, and in the U.S., the typical age of first use is 16. This is despite the fact that marijuana use is linked to some risks for young people, such as in the impairment of cognitive abilities and school performance, though a causality has not been established in this case.

=== Youth crime ===
During the 2010s, when most of Generation Z experienced some or all of their adolescence, reductions in youth crime were seen in some Western countries. A report looking at statistics from 2018 to 2019 noted that the numbers of young people aged ten to seventeen in England and Wales being cautioned or sentenced for criminal activity had fallen by 83% over the previous decade, while those entering the youth justice system for the first time had fallen by 85%. In 2006, 3,000 youths in England and Wales were detained for criminal activity; ten years later, that number fell below 1,000. In Europe, teenagers were less likely to fight than before. Research from Australia suggested that crime rates among adolescents had consistently declined between 2010 and 2019.

In a 2014 report, Statistics Canada stated that police-reported crimes committed by persons between the ages of 12 and 17 had been falling steadily since 2006 as part of a larger trend of decline from a peak in 1991. Between 2000 and 2014, youth crimes plummeted 42%, above the drop for overall crime of 34%. In fact, between the late 2000s and mid-2010s, the fall was especially rapid. This was primarily driven by a 51% drop in theft of items worth no more than CAN$5,000 and burglary. The most common types of crime committed by Canadian adolescents were theft and violence. At school, the most frequent offenses were possession of cannabis, common assault, and uttering threats. Overall, although they made up only 7% of the population, adolescents stood accused of 13% of all crimes in Canada. In addition, mid- to late-teens were more likely to be accused of crimes than any other age group in the country.

== Family and social life ==
=== Upbringing ===
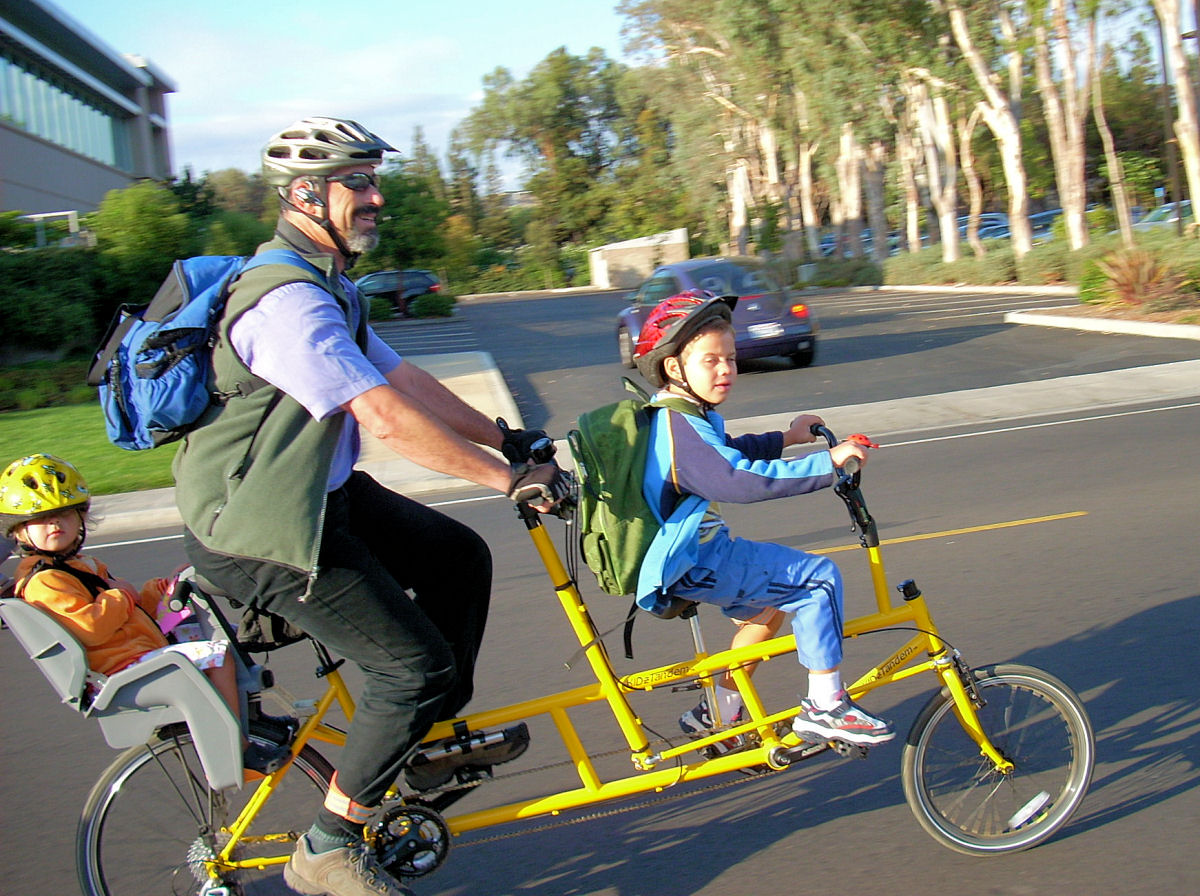
A man rides a multi-seated bicycle with two children (2007). In most developed countries, except France, parents have been spending more time with their children than in the past.

Parents increasingly realize that in order to ensure their children have the best future attainable, they must have fewer of them and invest more resources per child. Sociologists Judith Treas and Giulia M. Dotti Sani analyzed the diaries of 122,271 parents (68,532 mothers and 53,739 fathers) aged 18 to 65 in households with at least one child below the age of 13 from 1965 to 2012 in eleven Western countries—Canada, the United Kingdom, the United States, Spain, Italy, France, the Netherlands, Germany, Denmark, Norway, and Slovenia—and discovered that in general, parents had been spending more and more time with their children. In 2012, the average mother spent twice as much time with her offspring than her counterpart in 1965. Among fathers, the average amount of time quadrupled. Nevertheless, women were still the primary caregivers. Parents of all education levels were represented, though those with higher education typically spent much more time with their children, especially university-educated mothers. France was the only exception. French mothers were spending less time with their children whereas fathers were spending more time. This overall trend reflected the dominant ideology of "intensive parenting"—the idea that the time parents spend with children is crucial for their development in various areas and the fact that fathers developed more egalitarian views with regards to gender roles over time and became more likely to want to play an active role in their children's lives.

In the United Kingdom, there was a widespread belief in the early 21st century that rising parental, societal and state concern for the safety of children was leaving them increasingly mollycoddled and slowing the pace they took on responsibilities. The same period saw a rise in child-rearing's position in the public discourse with parenting manuals and reality TV programs focused on family life, such as Supernanny, providing specific guidelines for how children should be cared for and disciplined.

According to Statistics Canada, the number of households with both grandparents and grandchildren remained rare but grew in the early 21st century. In 2011, five percent of Canadian children below the age of ten lived with a grandparent, up from 3.3% in the previous decade. This is in part because Canadian parents in the early 21st century could not (or believe they could not) afford childcare and often find themselves having to work long hours or irregular shifts. Meanwhile, many grandparents struggled to keep up with their highly active grandchildren on a regular basis due to their age. Because Millennials and members of Generation X tend to have fewer children than their parents the Baby Boomers, each child typically receives more attention from grandparents and parents compared to previous generations.

=== Friendships and socialization ===
According to the OECD PISA surveys, 15-year-olds in 2015 had a tougher time making friends at school than ten years prior. European teenagers were becoming more and more like their Japanese and South Korean counterparts in social isolation. This might be due to intrusive parenting, heavy use of electronic devices, and concerns over academic performance and job prospects.

Despite being almost incessantly online, large swaths of Generation Z are willing and able to form offline or face-to-face social relationships. Although the sociocultural zeitgeist of social media platforms have a greater influence on them than their families and schools, authenticity is of great importance to them.

=== Romance, marriage, and family ===
According to a 2014 report from UNICEF, some 250 million females were forced into marriage before the age of 15, especially in South Asia and sub-Saharan Africa. Problems faced by child brides include loss of educational opportunity, less access to medical care, higher childbirth mortality rates, depression, and suicidal ideation. On the other hand, rates of adolescent pregnancy continue to fall in the developed world, as mentioned in a previous section.

During the 2020s, young adults around the world are much more likely to be romantically unattached, either by choice or circumstance, than older living generations at the same age. This trend is most pronounced among urban, university-educated young women, and the poor. East Asia, the Middle East, North Africa, and Latin America saw the steepest declines compared to the 2000s. In Europe, Generation Z is noticeably less likely to be married or living with a partner, compared to older cohorts. Many youths are also uninterested in having children. Some have pets instead.

Social media, online dating sites, and political polarization are contributing factors to this social trend among Generation Z. In Australia, growing numbers of older teenage boys and young men have been avoiding romantic relationships altogether, citing concerns over the traumatic experiences of older male family members, including false accusations of sexual misconduct or loss of assets and money after a divorce.

In China, young people nowadays are much more likely to deem marriage and children sources of stress rather than fulfillment. This trend is an extension of the "lying flat" movement, popular among Chinese youths. Pluralities of young urban residents of the 2020s told pollsters they were not planning to get married due to having trouble finding the right person, the high costs of marriage, or skepticism of marriage. Across East Asia, young women are increasingly wary of marriage in their highly patriarchal societies. As social scientist Wei-Jun Jean Yeung of the National University of Singapore explains, "The opportunity cost of getting married may be high: women think that if they get married they may have to give up working to take care of their in-laws, parents and children, plus do housework." In India, Generation Z is more likely to adopt non-traditional relationships, such as open or casual ones, than prior cohorts due to changes in technology, cultural change, and a greater emphasis on self-growth and individual autonomy.

While urban university-educated young women of the 2010s and 2020s often hold gender-egalitarian views, this is not the case among young men. In China, for instance, men with higher education view feminism as a threat. Among Australian teenagers and young men, many have joined the Men Going Their Own Way (MGTOW) community—an outgrowth of the men's rights movement, but one that emphasizes detachment from women as a way to deal with the issues men face.

== Use of information and communications technologies ==
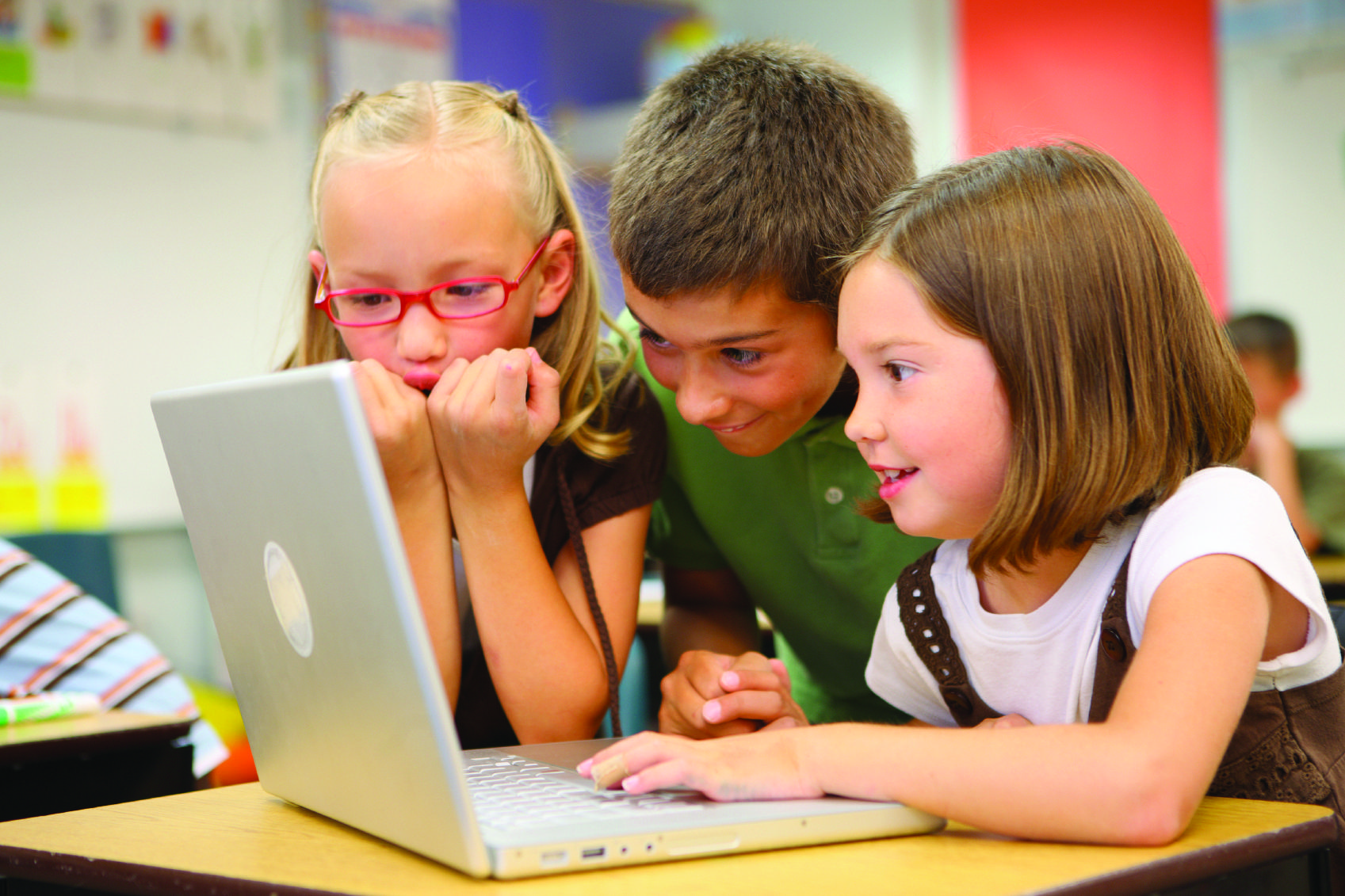
Schoolchildren using a laptop computer in 2008; Generation Z was one of the first generations to have widespread access to the Internet at an early age.

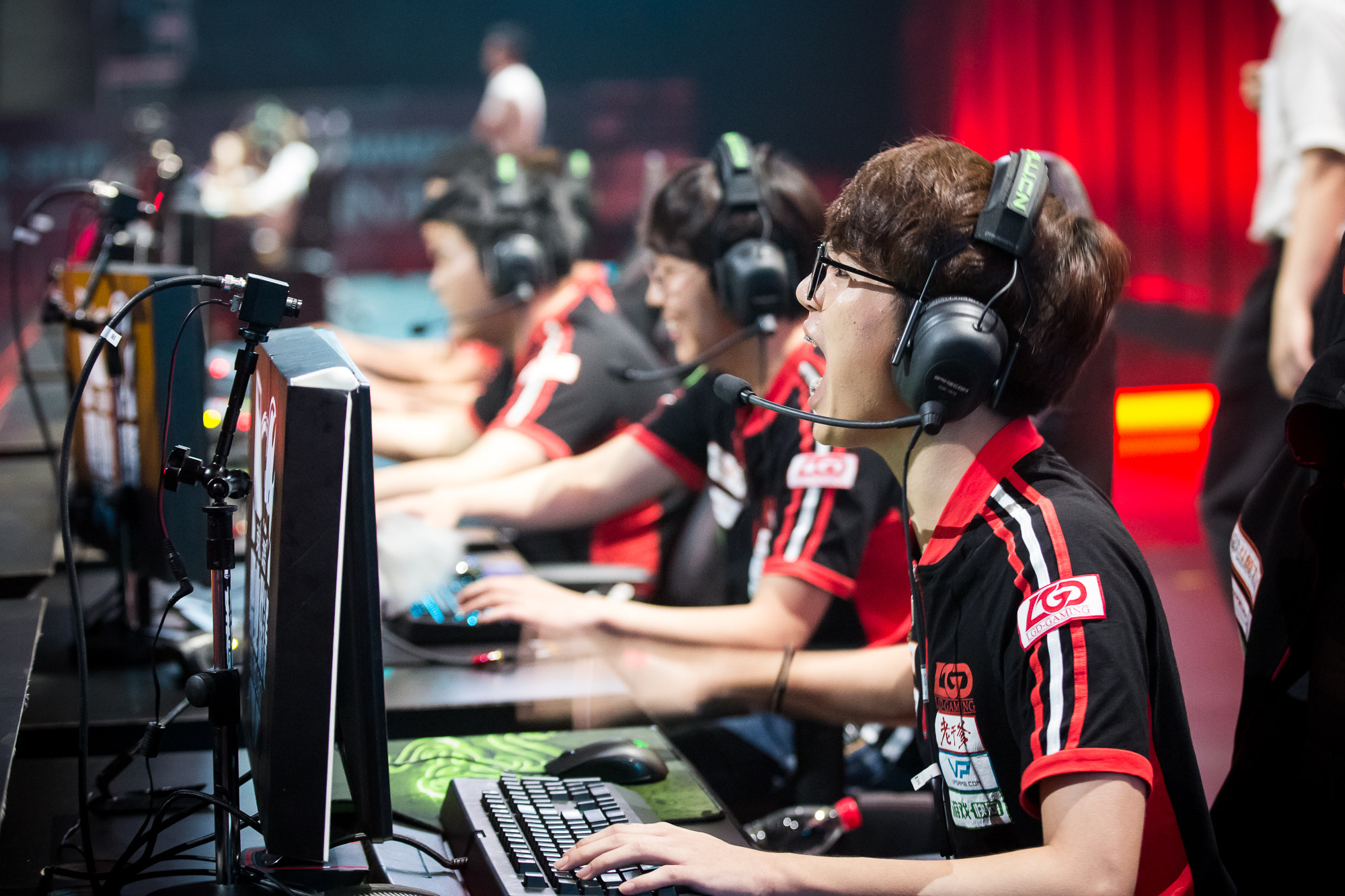
Participants of a video game competition in 2015. Most Generation Z grew up with mobile and online video gaming.

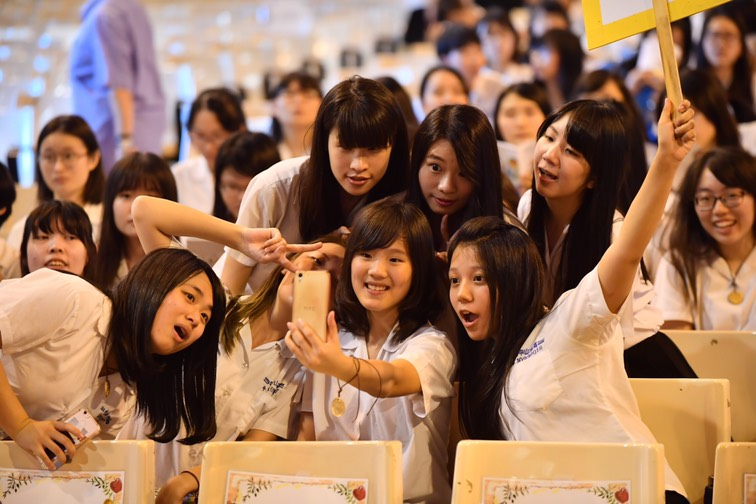
High school girls taking a group photo in 2016; 21st-century youths are highly reliant on their mobile devices.

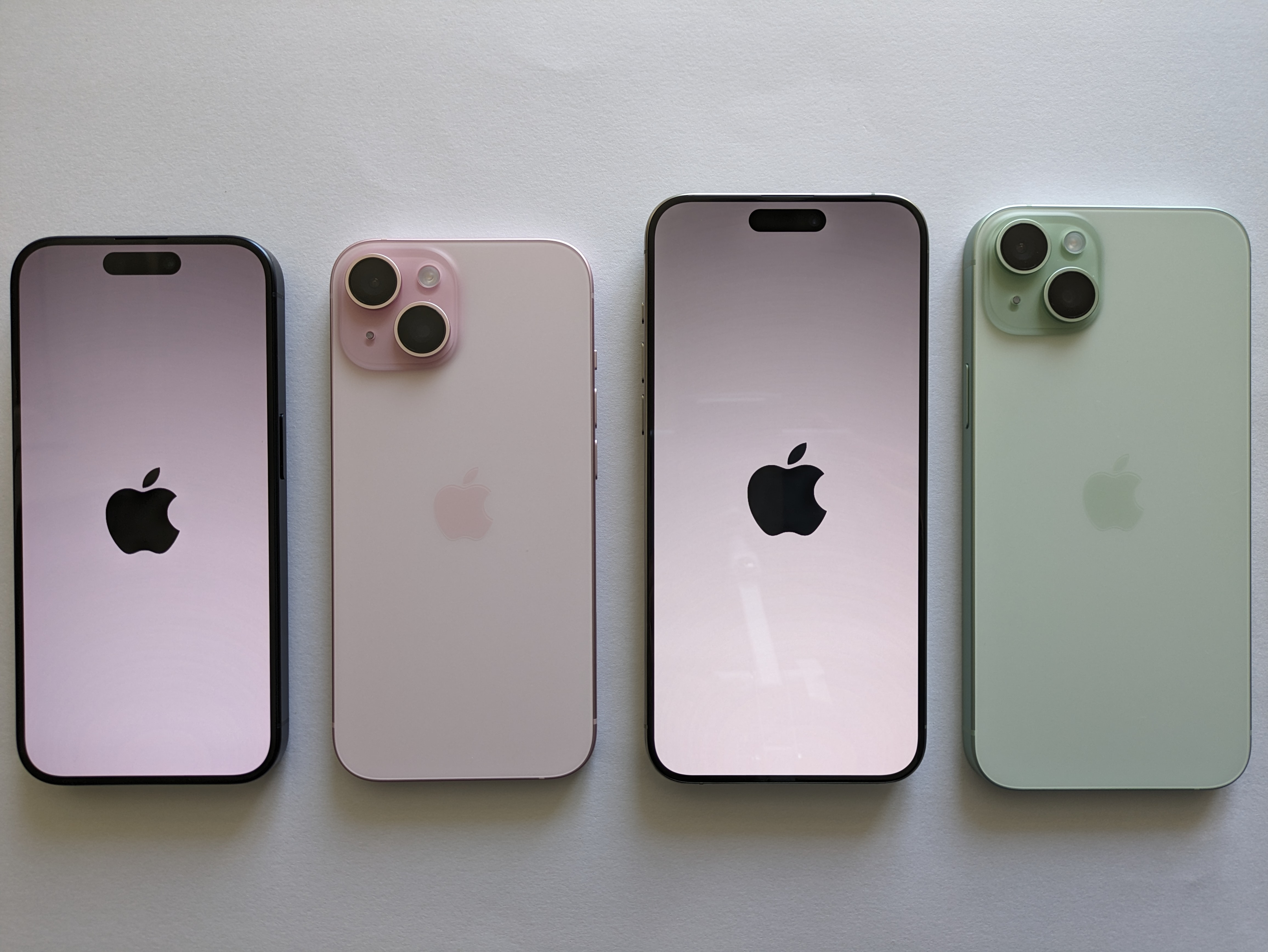
The iPhone is one of the most ubiquitous mobile devices among Generation Z.

Generation Z is one of the first cohorts to have Internet technology readily available at a young age. Generation Z grew up during the Web 2.0 era, experiencing massive growth in mobile device use and technology access. Anthony Turner characterizes Generation Z as having a "digital bond to the Internet", and argues that it may help youth to escape from emotional and mental struggles they face offline.

According to U.S. consultants Sparks and Honey in 2014, 41% of Generation Z spend more than three hours per day using computers for purposes other than schoolwork, compared with 22% in 2004. In 2015, an estimated 150,000 apps, 10% of apps in Apple's App Store, were educational and aimed at children up to college level, though opinions are mixed as to whether the net result will be deeper involvement in learning and more individualized instruction, or impairment through greater technology dependence and a lack of self-regulation that may hinder child development. Parents who raise Gen Z children fear the overuse of the Internet, and dislike the ease of access to inappropriate information and images, as well as social networking sites where minors can gain access to people worldwide. Gen Z children, inversely, feel annoyed with their parents and complain about parents being overly controlling when it comes to their Internet usage.

A 2015 study by Microsoft found that 77% of respondents aged 18 to 24 said yes to the statement, "When nothing is occupying my attention, the first thing I do is reach for my phone," compared to just 10% for those aged 65 and over.

In a TEDxHouston talk, Jason Dorsey of the Center for Generational Kinetics stressed the notable differences in the way that Millennials and Generation Z consume technology, with 18% of Generation Z feeling that it is okay for a 13-year-old to have a smartphone, compared with just 4% for the previous generation. An online newspaper about texting, SMS and MMS writes that teens own cellphones without necessarily needing them; that receiving a phone is considered a rite of passage in some countries, allowing the owner to be further connected with their peers, and it is now a social norm to have one at an early age. An article from the Pew Research Center stated that "nearly three-quarters of teens have or have access to a smartphone and 30% have a basic phone, while just 12% of teens 13 to 15 say they have no cell phone of any type". These numbers are only on the rise and the fact that the majority own a cell phone became one of Generation Z's defining characteristics. The article states that "24% of teens go online 'almost constantly'."

A survey of students from 79 countries by the OECD found that the amount of time spent using an electronic device has increased, from under two hours per weekday in 2012 to close to three in 2019, at the expense of extracurricular reading.

Psychologists have observed that sexting, the transmission of sexually explicit content via electronic devices, has seen noticeable growth among contemporary adolescents. Older teenagers are more likely to participate in sexting. Besides some cultural and social factors such as the desire for acceptance and popularity among peers, the falling age at which a child receives a smartphone may contribute to the growth in this activity. However, while it is clear that sexting has an emotional impact on adolescents, it is still not clear how it precisely affects them. Some consider it a high-risk behavior because of the ease of dissemination to third parties leading to reputational damage and the link to various psychological conditions including depression and even suicidal ideation. Others defend youths' freedom of expression over the Internet. There is some evidence that at least in the short run, sexting brings positive feelings of liveliness or satisfaction. However, girls are more likely than boys to be receiving insults, social rejections, or reputational damage as a result of sexting.

=== Digital literacy ===
Despite being labeled as digital natives, the 2018 International Computer and Information Literacy Study (ICILS), conducted on 42,000 eighth-graders (or equivalents) from 14 countries and education systems, found that only two percent of these people were sufficiently proficient with information devices to justify that description, and only 19% could work independently with computers to gather information and to manage their work. ICILS assesses students on two main categories: Computer and Information Literacy (CIL), and Computational Thinking (CT). Countries that were near or above the international average for both categories were France, the United States, Finland, South Korea, and Denmark.

By the early 2020s, many members of Generation Z were entering the digital workplace without some basic ICT skills, such as touch typing, though they can learn more quickly than older workers.

=== Pornography viewing ===
While pornography is made for entertainment, teenagers are increasingly turning to it as a source of information on sexuality, especially what to do during a sexual encounter, as teachers tend to focus on contraception. In fact, pornography is reaching an increasingly large youth audience — as young as people in their early teenage years – not only on social networks, but also on dedicated websites, thanks both to their access to electronic devices and the influence of their friends. Although parents generally believe adolescents who view pornography for pleasure tend to be boys, surveys and interviews reveal that this behavior is also common among girls. A 2020 report by the British Board of Film Classification (BBFC)—available only by request due to the presence of graphic materials—suggests that parents either are in denial or are completely oblivious to the prevalence of pornography viewership by adolescents, with three quarters telling researchers that they did not believe their children consumed such material. Over half of the teenagers interviewed told researchers they had viewed pornography, though the actual number is likely higher due to the sensitivity of this topic. Many interviewees told researchers they felt anxious about their body image and the expectations of their potential sexual partners as a result of viewing, and their concerns over sexual violence. About one-third of the British population watches these films, according to industry estimates.

=== Use of social media networks ===
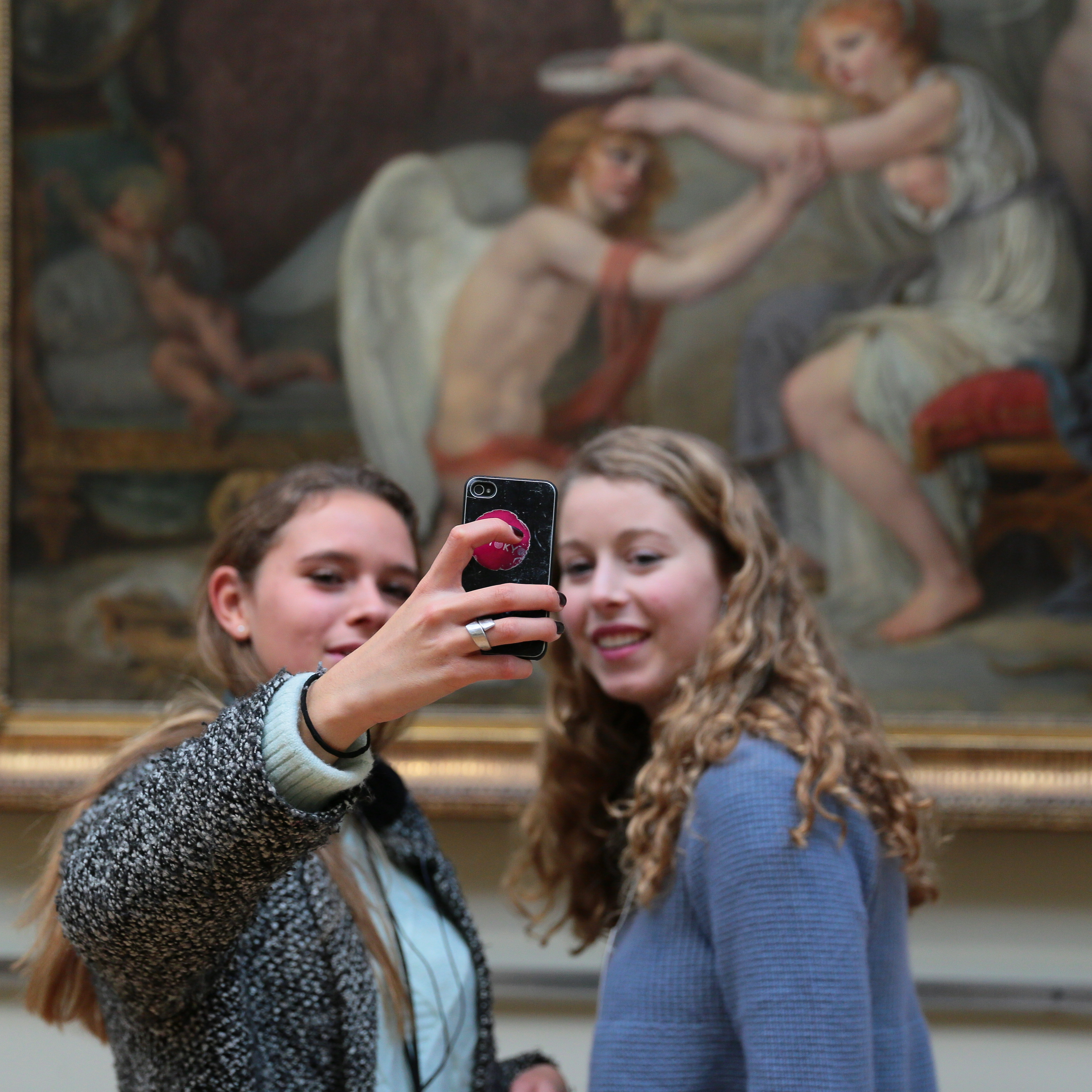
Two young women taking a selfie at the Palais des Beaux-Arts in Lille, France (2016)

Members of Generation Z live during a time of widespread access to social media platforms and have consequently integrated these into their daily lives, using them to not only communicate with friends and family but also interact with people they would otherwise never meet in the real world. Social media have become a tool for Generation Z to forge their personal identities, and to get their news. Indeed, an absolute majority have used social media and are frequently online. However, one side effect of this trend is that they interact "face to face" less often, causing them to feel more lonely and left out. Some also report online fatigue and want to spend less time on the Internet while others admit to having regrets about certain things they posted online. Speed and reliability are important factors in their choice of social networking platform, and they make frequent use of emojis. Unlike older generations, who prefer newspapers and television reports, Generation Z uses social media to access the news. Nevertheless, even though people aged 18 to 24 are heavily reliant upon social media networks, they have very little trust in them. On the other hand, despite common concerns, social media have helped make movies part of youth culture once again. Films such as Minions: The Rise of Gru (2022) and A Minecraft Movie (2025) were successful in part because discussions of them went "viral" on the Internet, including on Letterboxd, a site for sharing and reviewing movies.

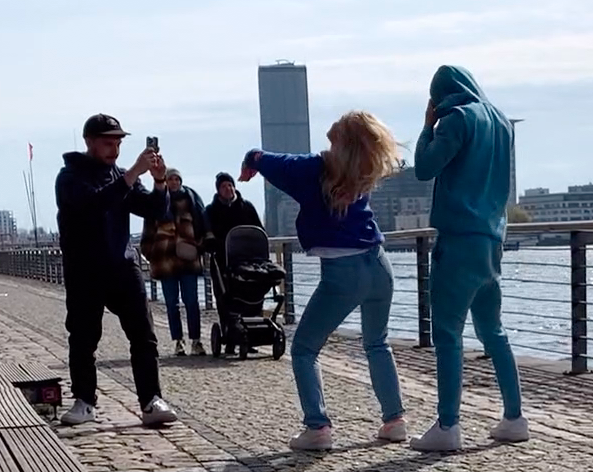
Teenagers producing a video for TikTok (2022)

Once the single most popular social media site among teenagers, Facebook has been on the decline since the early 2010s. The share of teenagers using Twitter has fallen as well. At the same time, YouTube has claimed the top spot while Snapchat and Instagram have also made significant gains. During the late 2010s and early 2020s, TikTok exploded in usage among adolescents and has become the second most frequently used platform, surpassing Instagram in 2021. According to Advertising Age, Generation Z finds Snapchat and TikTok appealing because videos, pictures, and messages send much faster on it than in regular messaging. Another reason for the popularity of these platforms among Generation Z is that their parents do not typically use them. As of 2022, TikTok has around 689 million active users, 43% of whom are from Gen Z. So popular is TikTok among people under the age of 30 in Europe and North America that they typically ignore their own governments' concerns over issues of user privacy and national security.

=== Effects of screen time ===
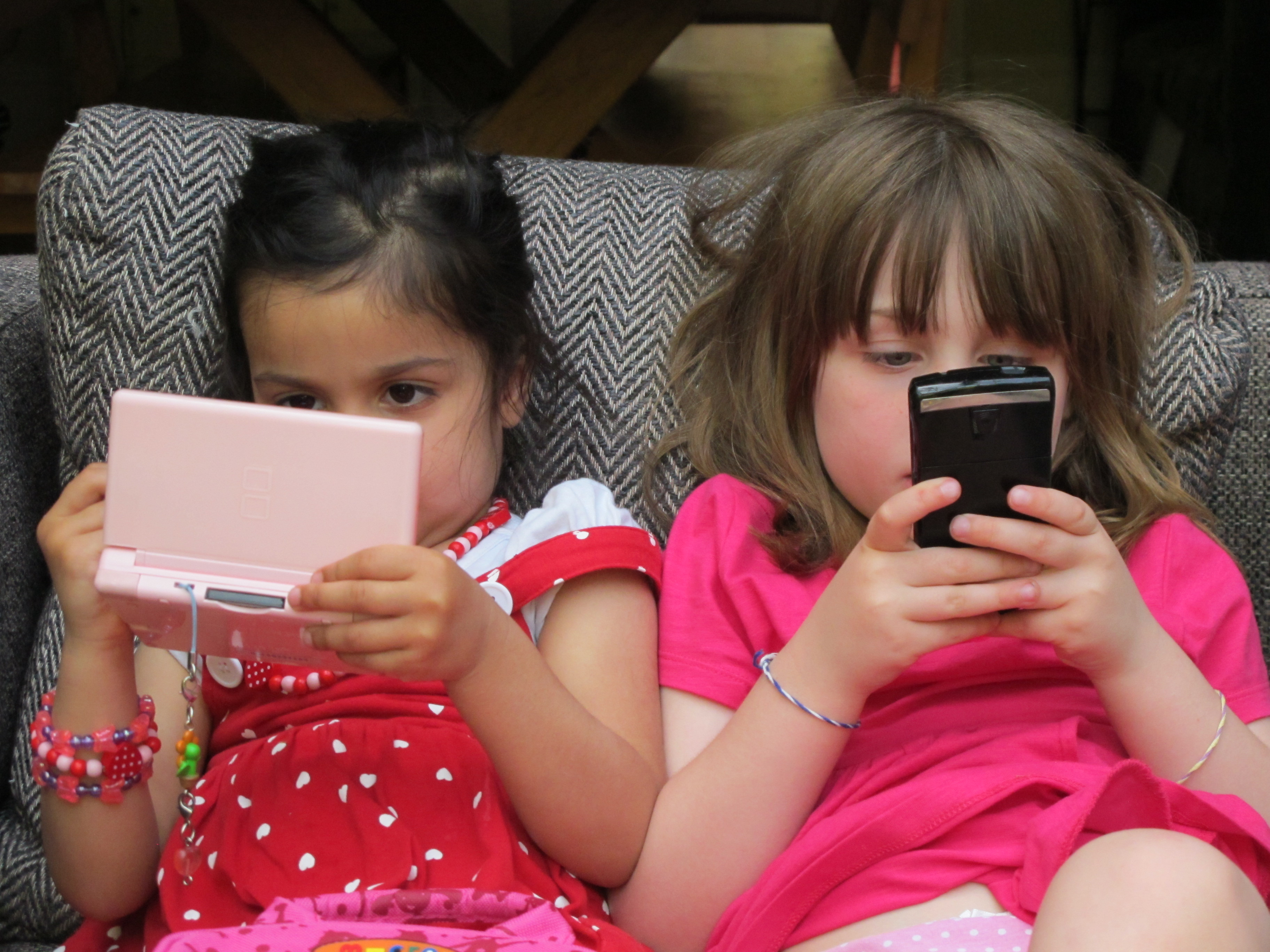
Two children on their electronic devices (2011)

In his 2017 book Irresistible, professor of marketing Adam Alter argued that not only are children addicted to electronic gadgets, but their addiction jeopardizes their ability to read non-verbal social cues.

Other researchers have found evidence that excessive television viewing, video-game playing, and Internet surfing harm academic performance, language fluency, mathematical ability, the development of social skills, mental health, and school grades. According to previous research, screen activities not only take away the time that could be spent on homework, physical activities, verbal communication, and sleep (the time-displacement hypothesis) but also diminish mental activities (the passivity hypothesis). Overall, the effects of screen time are stronger among adolescents than children. According to a 2020 report by the British Board of Film Classification, "many young people felt that the way they viewed their overall body image was more likely the result of the kinds of body images they saw on Instagram."

In addition, how Generation Z uses social media platforms may be associated with loneliness, anxiety, and fragility. Furthermore, girls are disproportionately affected by the negative aspects of social media than boys. Girls are much more likely to report experiencing cyberbullying, decreased self-esteem, and emotional instability more than boys. Girls make friends on social media more often than boys, who more frequently make friends through video gaming.

== See also ==
- 9X Generation – Vietnamese demographic cohort born in the 1990s
- Boomerang Generation – Young adults returning to live with their parents
- Gen Z stare – Staring behaviour associated with Generation Z
- Generation K – A demographic cohort defined by Noreena Hertz
- Generation Z in the United States
- Glossary of Generation Z slang
- List of generations
- Post-90s and Little emperor syndrome (China)
- Strawberry generation – Taiwanese neologism for sensitive people
- Thumb tribe – Term for people adept at texting

== Notes ==
Preceded by Millennials; 1981 – 1996	Generation Z 1997 – 2012	Succeeded by Generation Alpha early 2010s – 2020s
