= Time displacement =

Concept in sociology

Time displacement in sociology refers to the idea that new forms of activities may replace older ones. New activities that cause time displacement are usually technology-based, most common are the information and communication technologies such as Internet and television. Those technologies are seen as responsible for declines of previously more common activities such as in- and out-of-home socializing, work, and even personal care and sleep.

For example, Internet users may spend time online using it as a substitute of other activities that served similar function(s) (watching television, reading printed media, face to face interaction, etc.). Internet is not the first technology to result in time displacement. Earlier, television had a similar impact, as it shifted people's time from activities such as listening to radio, going to movie theaters or, talking in house, or spending time outside it.

== See also ==
- Parkinson's law
