= Judith Treas =

American sociologist

Judith K. Treas (born c. 1947) is an American sociologist. She is Professor of Sociology and Director of the Center for Demographic and Social Analysis at the University of California, Irvine. Treas is recognized for her research on gender, family, inequality, and the life course.

== Education and employment ==
Treas earned her B.A. in sociology from Pitzer College in 1969, and her Ph.D. in sociology from the University of California, Los Angeles in 1976. She began her academic career at the University of Southern California. In 1989, she joined the University of California, Irvine as the founding chair of its newly established Department of Sociology.

== Academic contributions ==
Treas was among the first researchers to study the social mobility and occupational attainments of women. How men and women organize their relationships is the focus of her work on the sociology of the family. Her many publications address the division of household labor, sexual fidelity, expenditures on domestic help, time spent with family members, and household management. Introducing transaction cost theory to family sociology, Treas showed that the factors that lead firms to merge also explain why couples opt for joint, rather than separate, bank accounts.

Dividing the Domestic: Women, Men and Household Work in Cross-National Perspective argued that who does what around the house depends not only on personal circumstances, but also on societal characteristics, such as employment regulations, state arrangements for children's schooling, and new cultural ideals for a happy marriage.

A second line of research concerns intergenerational relationships. Influential early work cautioned that demographic trends could undermine intergenerational supports for older adults. She revised her thinking in a recent cross-national analysis linking cell phone technology to a rise in adult contact with parents.

A leading expert on older adults in America's immigrant families, Treas coined the term .5 (Point-Five) generation to describe the slow incorporation of late-life immigrants to the U.S.

== Awards, honors, and service ==
In 2010, Treas was honored with the Matilda White Riley Award for career achievement from the Section on Aging and the Life Course of the American Sociological Association. She is a fellow of the Gerontological Society of America. A member of the U.S. Census Advisory Committee on Professional Associations from 2004 to 2007, she chaired the CACPA-Population Association of America Sub-committee in 2006–07. She served as chair of the American Sociological Association's Section on Population (2011–12) and president of the Pacific Sociological Association (2009–10). In 2012, the National Council on Family Relations (NCFR) named Treas a lifetime fellow. Fellow status in NCFR is awarded to 3 percent or fewer living members who have made outstanding and enduring contributions to the field of the family in the areas of scholarship, teaching, outreach, and professional service.
