= Keith (given name) =

- Pronunciation: /ˈkiːθ/ KEETH
- Gender: Male

Origin
- Origin: Celtic
- Meaning: "wood", "from the battleground"

Keith is a masculine given name of Gaelic origin. It means "wood" or "from the battleground" and shares the same derivation as Clan Keith. The surname derives from a toponym, Keith Marischal in East Lothian, possibly containing the Brittonic element *cet "woods, forest." Keith was the 298th most common name given to newborn boys in the United States in 2007.

== People with the given name ==
- Keith Abbis (born 1932), English footballer
- Keith Ablow (born 1961), American author and TV personality
- Keith Abney II (born 2005), American football player
- Keith Ackerman (born 1946), American bishop
- Keith Acton (born 1958), Canadian ice hockey player
- Keith Adams (American football) (born 1979), American football player
- Keith Adams (cricketer) (1932–2018), English cricketer
- Keith Adams (filmmaker) (1926–2012), Australian adventurer and filmmaker
- Keith Adams (weightlifter) (born 1950), Canadian weightlifter
- Keith John Adams, British singer/songwriter
- Keith Adamson (born 1945), English footballer
- Keith Agovida (born 1990), Filipino basketball player
- Keith Ahlers (born 1955), British race car driver
- Keith Aitken (1922–1995), Australian rugby league player
- Keith Allan (actor) (born 1969), American actor and screenwriter
- Keith Allan (linguist) (born 1943), Australian linguist
- Keith William Allan (1946–2000), Australian solicitor and murder victim
- Keith Anderson (born 1968), American country music artist
- Keith Andrews (footballer) (born 1980), Irish footballer
- Keith Azopardi (born 1967), Gibraltarian politician
- Keith Azzopardi Tanti (born 1984), Maltese politician
- Keith Baldwin (born 1960), American football player
- Keith Barnes (1934–2024), Australian rugby league player
- Keith Batchelor (1930–2009), Australian rules footballer
- Keith Beavers (born 1983), Canadian backstroke and medley swimmer
- Keith Beebe (1921–1998), American football player
- Keith Beirne (born 1996/1997), Leitrim Gaelic footballer
- Keith Bennett (basketball) (born 1961), American-Israeli basketball player
- Keith Berry (fighter) (born 1987), American mixed martial artist
- Keith Berry (musician) (born 1973), London-based musician and composer
- Keith Booth (born 1974), American basketball player
- Keith Bowman, American materials scientist
- Keith Braxton (born 1997), American basketball player
- Keith Buckley (born 1979), American musician, vocalist for Every Time I Die and The Damned Things
- Keith Campbell (artist) (born 1964), American artist, known as Scramble Campbell
- Keith Campbell (biologist) (1954–2012), British biologist, led team that cloned Dolly the sheep
- Keith Campbell (cricketer) (born 1943), New Zealand cricketer
- Keith Campbell (ice hockey) (1909–1981), Canadian ice hockey player
- Keith Campbell (motorcyclist) (1931–1958), Australian motorcycle road racer
- Keith Campbell (philosopher) (born 1938), Australian philosopher
- Keith Campbell (rugby league), Australian rugby league footballer
- W. Keith Campbell, American social psychologist
- Keith Caputo (born 1973), American musician, vocalist for Life of Agony
- Keith Carney (born 1970), American hockey player
- Keith Carradine (born 1949), American actor
- Keith Chapman (born 1958), British television writer and producer
- Keith Chegwin (1957–2017), British television presenter
- Gilbert Keith Chesterton (1874–1936), British writer
- Keith Christian, Australian zoologist
- Keith Cieplicki (born 1963), American basketball player and coach
- Keith C. Clarke (born 1955), cartographer
- Keith Clayton (1928–2013), English geographer and environmental scientist
- Keith Coleman (footballer) (born 1951), retired English footballer
- Keith Coleman, owner of Keith Coleman Racing, a NASCAR Busch Series team
- Keith Colmer (born 1967), American test pilot
- Keith Coogan (born 1970), American actor
- Keith Cooper (referee) (born 1948), Welsh football referee
- Keith D. Cooper, American computer scientist
- Keith Cooper Jr. (born 2003), American football player
- Keith Cozart (born 1995), stage name Chief Keef, American rapper and songwriter
- Keith Cupp (born 1964), American football player
- Keith Dambrot (born 1958), American college basketball coach
- Keith David (born 1956), American actor
- Keith Douglas (1920–1944), British poet
- Keith Eaman (born 1947), Canadian football player
- Keith Earls (born 1987), Irish rugby union player
- Keith Elam (1966–2010), American hip hop artist
- Keith Ellison (born 1963), American politician and lawyer
- Keith Emerson (1944–2016), English musician and composer
- Keith Erickson (born 1944), American basketball player
- Keith Falconer Fletcher (1900–1987), American politician
- Keith Ferguson (American football) (born 1959), former American football defensive end
- Keith Ferguson (musician) (1946–1997), American bass guitarist
- Keith Ferguson (sport shooter), Australian sport shooter
- Keith Ferguson (voice actor) (born 1972), American voice actor
- Keith Fisher, American ice hockey coach
- Keith Flint (1969–2019), member of British electronica band The Prodigy
- Keith Flowers (1930–1993), American football player
- Keith Floyd (1943–2009), British chef
- Keith Ford (born 1994), American football player
- Keith Forde, Irish singer-songwriter and musician
- Keith Fowler (1939–2023), American actor, director, producer and educator
- Keith Galloway (born 1985), Australian rugby league footballer
- Keith Edmund Gavin (1960–2024), American convicted murderer
- Keith Godard (1938–2020), British-born graphic artist and designer
- Keith Valentine Graham (born 1958), better known as Levi Roots, British-Jamaican musician, celebrity chef and businessman
- Keith Getty (born 1974), Irish musician
- Keith Gill (born 1986), American financial analyst and investor
- Keith Green (1953–1982), American musician
- Keith Guzah (died 2020), Zimbabwean politician
- Keith Haring (1958–1990), American artist
- Keith Harkin (born 1986), Irish solo musician and former principal singer of all-male musical group Celtic Thunder
- Keith Harris (cricketer) (born 1957), English cricketer
- Keith Harris (record producer) (born 1976), American record producer, songwriter and musician
- Keith Harris (rugby league) (born 1952), Australian rugby league footballer
- Keith Harris (ventriloquist) (1947–2015), English ventriloquist
- Keith R. Harris (born 1953), English financier
- Keith Hart (wrestler) (born 1951), American born-Canadian retired professional wrestler and firefighter
- Keith Henson (born 1942), American electrical engineer and writer on life extension, cryonics, memetics and evolutionary psychology
- Keith Hernandez (born 1953), American baseball player
- Keith Hitchins (1931–2020), American historian and professor
- Keith Hodge (born 1974), American comedian of the Hodgetwins
- Keith Holyoake (1904–1983), Prime Minister of New Zealand (1957, 1960–1972)
- Keith Ismael (born 1998), American football player
- Keith Jackson (1928–2016), American sportscaster
- Keith Jackson (defensive tackle) (born 1985), American football player
- Keith Jackson (media executive) (born 1945), British-born Australian journalist, blogger and retired media executive
- Keith Jackson (tight end) (born 1965), American football player
- Keith Jardine (born 1975), American mixed martial artist
- Keith Jarrett (born 1945), American jazz pianist
- Keith Hunter Jesperson (born 1955), Canadian-American serial killer
- Keith Jones (Atlanta Falcons), American football player
- Keith "End Zone" Jones (born 1966), American football player
- Keith Keane (born 1986), Irish footballer
- Keith Kidd (born 1962), American football player
- Keith Kirkwood (born 1993), American football player
- Keith Kokkola (1949–2004), Canadian ice hockey player
- Keith Lamb (musician) (born 1952), Australian singer and songwriter
- Keith Langford (born 1983), American basketball player
- Keith Lee (American football) (born 1957), American football player
- Keith Lee (basketball) (born 1962), American basketball player
- Keith Levene (1957–2022), English musician
- Keith Liddell, American mathematician and author
- Keith Lincoln (1939–2019), American football player
- Keith Lockhart (baseball) (born 1964), American baseball player
- Keith Lulia (born 1987), Australian-Cook Islander Rugby League player
- Keith Maillard (born 1942), American-Canadian novelist and poet
- Keith Malley (born 1974), American comedian and podcaster
- Keith Mansfield (born 1940), British composer and arranger
- Keith Mansfield (writer) (born 1965), English novelist and publisher
- Keith Mant (1919–2000), British forensic pathologist
- Keith McHenry (born 1957), American anarchist and activist
- Keith Miller (1919–2004), Australian cricketer
- Keith Millis (1915–1992), American metallurgist
- Keith Moon (1946–1978), English rock drummer
- Keith Moreland (born 1954), American baseball player
- Keith Morgan (judoka) (born 1973), Canadian judoka
- Keith Murdoch (1885–1952), Australian journalist and publisher
- Keith Murray (rapper) (born 1974), American hip hop artist
- Keith Neale, British public health doctor
- Keith Newman (born 1977), American football player
- Keith Olbermann (born 1959), American sportscaster and political commentator
- Keith Owens (born 1969), American basketball player
- Keith Palmer, numerous individuals
- Keith Park (1892–1975), New Zealand Air Marshall of World War II
- Keith Parkinson (1958–2005), American fantasy artist
- Keith Parkinson (rugby league), Australian rugby league player
- Keith Paterson (born 1931), British Internet celebrity
- Keith Powell (born 1979), American actor
- Keith Price (born 1991), American football player
- Keith Pritchard, American politician
- Keith Randolph Jr. (born 2001), American football player
- Keith Reaser (born 1991), American football player
- Keith Relf (1943–1976), English musician and vocalist
- Keith Richards (born 1943), English rock guitarist and songwriter
- Keith Ridgway (born 1965), Irish writer
- Keith Riglin (born 1957), Anglican bishop
- Keith Rupert Murdoch (born 1931), Australian-American businessman and media mogul
- Keith Sanderson (sport shooter) (born 1975), American sport shooter
- Keith Scott (footballer) (born 1967), English professional footballer
- Keith Scott (musician) (born 1954), Canadian guitar player
- Keith Scott (voice actor) (born 1953), Australian voice actor, impressionist and animation historian
- Keith Silverstein (born 1970), American voice actor, known for lending his voice to English versions of Japanese anime and video games
- Keith Slatter, English rugby league footballer
- Keith Stewart (1739–1795), Scottish Admiral and MP in the British Parliament
- Keith Stimely (1957–1992), American Holocaust denier
- Keith Strickland (born 1953), American rock musician, songwriter and member of the band The B-52s
- Keith Sweat (born 1961), American R&B singer
- Keith Syers (1939–2011), Anglo-New Zealand academic and academic administrator
- Keith Szarabajka (born 1952), American actor
- Keith Taylor (disambiguation), multiple people
- Keith Thomas (director), American film director
- Keith Thornton (born 1963), American rapper better known as Kool Keith
- Keith Tkachuk (born 1972), American hockey player
- Keith Towbridge (born 1995), American football player
- Keith Urban (born 1967), Australian country music singer
- Keith Vallejo, Mormon bishop
- Keith Van Horn (born 1975), American basketball player
- Keith Waldrop (1932–2023), American poet, translator, publisher, and academic
- Keith Walters, American academic
- Shane Keith Warne (1969–2022), Australian cricket player
- Keith Wells (1962–1994), American murderer
- Keith West (born 1943), English rock singer and songwriter
- Keith Whitley (1955–1989), American country music singer
- Keith Daniel Williams (1947–1996), American murderer
- Keith Wood (born 1972), Irish rugby union player
- Keith Woodrow (1927–1997), Scottish police officer
- Keith Woolner (born c. 1968), American baseball analyst
- Keith Yandle (born 1986), American hockey player
- Keith M L Yeung (born 1988), horse racing jockey in Hong Kong
- Keith Zettlemoyer (1955–1995), American murderer

== Fictional characters ==
- Keith Dudemeister, a supporting character in Scrubs
- Keith Harcourt, a character in Ashita no Nadja
- Keith Mars, father of the titular character in the American TV-series Veronica Mars
- Keith Partridge, oldest son, lead singer and guitarist in the American sitcom the Partridge Family
- Keith Ramsay, a character in Far Cry 3
- Dr. Keith Ricks, a dolphin researcher, one of the main characters of the TV series Flipper (1995 TV series), portrayed by Brian Wimmer
- Keith (Voltron), a main character of Voltron: Legendary Defender
- Keith Watson, from the TV series The Electric Company
- Keith Fermin (with artistic name Spectra Phantom), a character in the anime series Bakugan Battle Brawlers: New Vestroia and Bakugan: Mechtanium Surge

== See also ==
- Kieth, another given name
