= Mass shootings in the United States =

Incidents involving multiple victims of firearm violence

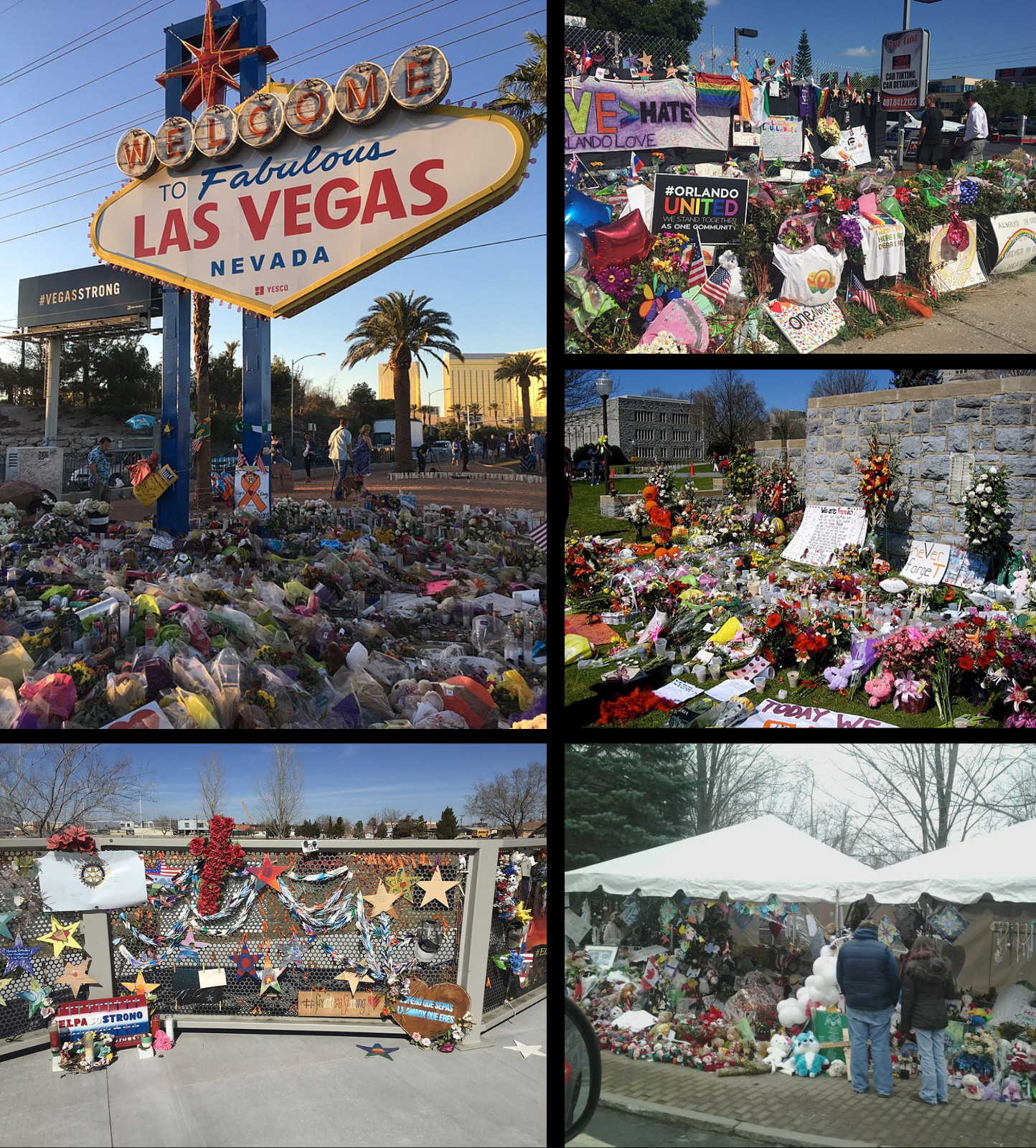
Memorials for some of the deadliest mass shootings that occurred in the United States. Clockwise from top left: The 2017 Las Vegas shooting, the Pulse nightclub shooting, the Virginia Tech shooting, the Sandy Hook Elementary School shooting, and the 2019 El Paso Walmart shooting.

Mass shootings are incidents involving multiple victims of firearm related violence. Definitions vary, with no single, broadly accepted definition. One definition is an act of public firearm violence—excluding gang killings, domestic violence, or terrorist acts sponsored by an organization—in which a shooter kills at least four victims. Using this definition, a 2016 study found that nearly one-third of the world's public mass shootings between 1966 and 2012 (90 of 292 incidents) occurred in the United States. In 2017, The New York Times recorded the same total of mass shootings for that span of years.

Perpetrator demographics vary by type of mass shooting, though in almost all cases they are male. Contributing factors may include easy access to guns, perpetrator suicidality and life history factors, and sociocultural factors including media reporting of mass shootings and declining social capital. However, reliable statistical generalizations about mass shootings are difficult to establish due to the absence of a universal definition for mass shootings, sources for data on mass shootings being incomplete and likely including biased samples of incidents, and mass shootings having low base rates.

The Federal Bureau of Investigation designated 61 of all events in 2021 as active shooter incidents. The United States has had more mass shootings than any other country. After a shooting, perpetrators generally either commit suicide or are restrained or killed by law enforcement officers. Mass shootings accounted for under 0.2% of gun deaths in the United States between 2000 and 2016, and less than 0.5% of all homicides in the United States from 1976 to 2018.

== Definitions ==
There is no fixed definition of a mass shooting in the United States, and different researchers define "mass shootings" in different ways. Of the seven following definitions, most use a minimum of four victims as a threshold. Among the various definitions are those that are:

- Based on injuries:

- Gun Violence Archive: More broadly defines "mass shooting" to mean four or more (excluding the perpetrator) shot at roughly the same time and location, regardless of number of fatalities or the motive. Brady: United Against Gun Violence uses a similar definition.

- Mass Shooting Tracker: Defines "mass shooting" as "an incident where four or more people are shot in a single shooting spree," including the perpetrator or police shootings of civilians around the perpetrator, and irrespective of the motive of the perpetrator or the location of the murders.

- Based on number of deaths:

- Investigative Assistance for Violent Crimes Act of 2012, signed into law in January 2013: Defines a "mass killing" as the killing of at least three victims, excluding the perpetrator, and regardless of the weapon used.

- Everytown for Gun Safety, which tracks mass shootings based on press accounts, police records, and court papers, defines mass shooting as "any incident in which four or more people are shot and wounded or killed, excluding the shooter."

- Based on number of deaths and nature of attack:

- Congressional Research Service (CRS) 2015 report titled Mass Murder with Firearms: Did not define "mass shooting" but defined "public mass shooting" for the purposes of its report as "a multiple homicide incident in which four or more victims are murdered with firearms, within one event, and in one or more locations in close proximity." The CRS further states that its report "attempts to refine the relatively broad concept of mass shooting...into a narrower formulation: public mass shootings."

- Mother Jones's open-source database of mass shootings: The magazine's database, established after the 2012 Aurora movie theater massacre and updated continuously since that time, defines "mass shootings" as "indiscriminate rampages in public places resulting in four or more victims killed by the attacker," excluding "shootings stemming from more conventionally motivated crimes such as armed robbery or gang violence" and shootings in which the perpetrator has not been identified. This definition generally is consistent with the FBI's figures and the data used by criminologists.

- 2022 National Institute of Justice/The Violence Project dataset: Defines "mass public shooting" as an incident in which at least four victims were killed with firearms in a single event "and the murders are not attributable to any other underlying criminal activity or commonplace circumstance (armed robbery, criminal competition, insurance fraud, argument, or romantic triangle)."

The FBI defines an "active shooter" incident as "one or more individuals actively engaged in killing or attempting to kill people in a populated area", excluding gun-related incidents that were the result of self-defense, gang or drug violence, residential or domestic disputes, crossfire as a byproduct of another ongoing criminal act, controlled barricade or hostage situations, or actions that appeared not to have put other people in peril.

The appropriateness of a broad versus narrow definition of "mass shooting" has been the subject of debate. Some commentators argue in favor of a narrow definition of mass shootings that excludes the victims of street crime. Mark Follman of Mother Jones, which compiles an open-source database of mass shootings, contends that "While all the victims are important, conflating those many other crimes with indiscriminate slaughter in public venues obscures our understanding of this complicated and growing problem." Northeastern University criminologist James Alan Fox argues against the use of the broad definition of "mass shooting" in the popular press, stating that it misleads readers. Others, by contrast, argue that defining "mass shooting" solely as a shooting in a public place in which the perpetrator fires at random is too narrow. For example, Mark Hay argues that although gang, party, and domestic violence "probably warrant different solutions" than random mass public shootings, a narrow definition fails "to capture and convey the full scope of large-scale gun violence in the United States" and its effect on marginalized communities.

== Frequency ==
The U.S. has substantially more mass shootings (in which four or more people are killed) than other developed countries.

A New York Times study reported how outcomes of active shooter attacks varied with actions of the attacker, the police (42% of total incidents), and bystanders (including a "good guy with a gun" outcome in 5.1% of total incidents).

As of 2017, studies indicated that the rate at which public mass shootings occur has tripled since 2011. Between 1982 and 2011, a mass shooting occurred roughly once every 200 days. However, between 2011 and 2014, that rate has accelerated greatly with at least one mass shooting occurring every 64 days in the United States.

FBI data shows that active shooter incidents increased from 2000 to 2019. Under the definition used by the Gun Violence Archive, by the end of 2019, there were 417 mass shootings; by the end of 2020, there had been 611; and by the end of 2021, 693. By mid-May 2021, there were 10 mass shootings per week on average; by mid-May 2022, there was a total of 198 mass shootings in the first 19 weeks of the year, which represents 11 mass shootings a week. The FBI designated 61 active shooter incidents. There were ten mass shootings in 2019, two in 2020, and six in 2021. Under the substantially narrower 2022 National Institute of Justice/The Violence Project dataset definition, there were 167 mass shootings (4 or more killed with firearms in public, not connected to "underlying criminal activity or commonplace circumstance") in the U.S. from 1966 to 2019, and 30.8% of the shootings occurred at the workplace.

A comprehensive report by USA Today tracked all mass killings from 2006 through 2017 in which the perpetrator willfully killed four or more people. For mass killings by firearm for instance, it found 271 incidents with a total of 1,358 victims.

In October 2018, PLOS One published a study analyzing 100 mass shootings from the Mother Jones database from January 1982 to May 2018 to evaluate whether mass shootings became more common in the United States over the preceding three decades. It found that mass shootings had steadily increased. However, some researchers dispute whether the frequency of mass shootings is increasing due to differences in research methods and differences in the criteria used to define events as mass shootings.

In 2018 The Washington Post recorded 163 mass shootings in the United States between 1967 and June 2019. Mother Jones recorded 140 mass shootings between 1982 and February 2023.

Under the Everytown for Gun Safety definition ("any incident in which four or more people are shot and wounded or killed, excluding the shooter") there were an average of 463 mass shootings in the U.S. each year from 2015 to 2022. The report found that: "In nearly all mass shootings over this period, the shooter was an adult man who acted alone. Thirty-two percent of mass shooters, or 92 shooters, ended with the perpetrator committing suicide, and another 24 shooters were killed by responding law enforcement. The remaining 145 mass shooters were taken into custody by law enforcement, while the outcomes and identities of 23 remain unknown." In 2022, the Violence Project of the National Institute of Justice recorded 185 mass shootings from 1966 to December 2022. A 2023 report published in The Journal of the American Medical Association (JAMA) covering 2014 to 2022, found there had been 4,011 mass shootings in the US.

== Perpetrator demographics ==
According to The New York Times, there is no common profile of people who carry out mass shootings in the United States, except that they are mostly men. By race, according to a study, the proportion of mass shooters in the United States who are white is about equal to the overall proportion of white people in the general population of the US. The proportion of male mass shooters is considerably larger than the proportion of males in the general population. According to the Associated Press, white men comprise nearly 50% of all mass shooters in the US. According to the National Institute of Justice/The Violence project study, the demographics of shooters were 97.7% male, with an average age of 34.1 years, 52.3% white, 20.9% black, 8.1% Latino, 6.4% Asian, 4.2% Middle Eastern, and 1.8% Native American.

According to the Center for Inquiry, mass shootings of family members (the most common) are usually carried out by white, middle-aged males. Felony-related mass shootings (connected with a previous crime) tend to be committed by young black or Hispanic males with extensive criminal records, typically against people of the same ethnic group. Public mass shootings of persons unrelated to the shooter, and for a reason not connected with a previous crime (the rarest but most publicized) are committed by men whose racial distribution closely matches that of the nation as a whole. Other than gender, the demographic profiles of public mass shooters are too varied to draw firm conclusions. In a 2014 review of 160 active shooter incidents in the U.S. from 2000 to 2013 across 40 states and the District of Columbia, the FBI found that the perpetrator was female in only 6 of the 160 incidents (4%) and that in only 2 incidents (1%) was there more than one perpetrator. Analogously, in December 2013, the Journal of Forensic Sciences published a sociodemographic network characteristics and antecedent behaviors survey of 119 lone-actor terrorists in the United States and Europe that found that 96.6% were male.

== Contributing factors ==
In a 2026 meta-analysis, a study found "consistent patterns in perpetrators’ experiences, behaviors, and communications prior to the attacks." The study, released by the Rockefeller Institute of Government in Albany, New York, reviewed 171 mass shootings in 39 states from 1999 to 2024, had several "Key findings":

1. "Mass public shootings occur across a wide range of locations and contexts." These included 39/50 states, 24/7.
2. "Perpetrators often experience multiple, overlapping stressors", including mental illness and either job- and/or family-related stressors; and most of them "have prior contact with law enforcement."
3. "Firearms are most commonly obtained through legal channels."
4. Planning is broadcast by the perpetrator, which is called leakage, "or the communication of violent thoughts or intentions, prior to the attack," and specific threats.

=== High gun accessibility ===
Annual gun production in the U.S. has increased substantially in the 21st century, after having remained fairly level over preceding decades. By 2023, a majority of U.S. states allowed adults to carry concealed guns in public.

Multiple studies show that where people have easy access to firearms, gun-related deaths tend to be more frequent, including by suicide, homicide and unintentional injuries.

Total deaths in U.S. mass shootings since 1982—defined as four or more people shot and killed in one incident, excluding the perpetrator, at a public place, excluding gang-related killings.

After the 2004 expiration of the Federal Assault Weapons Ban, the firearms industry embraced the AR-15's political and cultural significance for marketing. Almost every major gunmaker produces its own version, with ~16 million Americans owning at least one.

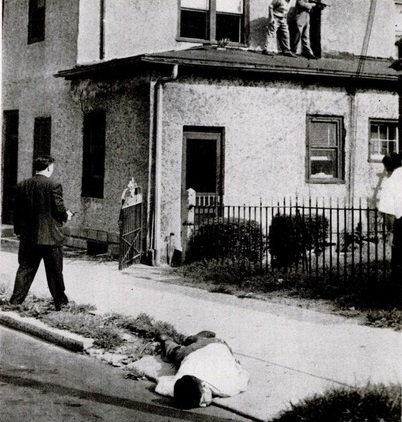
Police converge upon the home of the perpetrator of the Camden shootings. The firearm used by the perpetrator had been legally purchased.

Higher accessibility and ownership of guns has been cited as a reason for the U.S.'s high rate of mass shootings. The U.S. has the highest per-capita gun ownership in the world with 120.5 firearms per 100 people; the second highest is Yemen with 52.8 firearms per 100 people.

Researchers have found a reduction in the number of mass shooting related homicides while the Federal Assault Weapons Ban (FAWB) was in place from 1994 to 2004, which had banned certain types of semi-automatic rifles, including AR-15s. However, researchers also acknowledged that it was difficult to prove that the ban was the cause of this. Conversely, the RAND Corporation published a review in 2023 of five studies researching the effects of the FAWB and state assault weapons bans on the frequency and lethality of mass shootings and found the evidence to be inconclusive, and the review also evaluated two studies researching the effect of high-capacity magazine bans on reducing the frequency and lethality of mass shootings and found the evidence for an effect to be limited.

Several types of guns have been used in mass shootings in the United States, including semi-automatic handguns, semi-automatic rifles, revolvers, and shotguns. Of the 172 events from 1966 to 2019 classified as mass public shootings (four or more victims killed) in the U.S. by the dataset compiled by The Violence Project of the National Institute of Justice, perpetrators used handguns in 77.2% of cases and semi-automatic rifles in 25.1% of cases. An earlier 2016 study by James Alan Fox and Emma E. Fridel similarly concluded that "rather than assault weapons, semiautomatic handguns are the weapons of choice for most mass shooters." High-capacity magazines were used in more than half of mass shootings over the four decades up to 2018. Although semi-automatic rifles are used in only 1% of overall shootings in the U.S., they are used in 25% of mass shootings, and (as of 2018) in six of the ten deadliest mass shooting events.

A study published in PLOS One in 2015 examined mass shootings in the U.S. from 2005 to 2013 (and school shootings in the U.S. from 1998 to 2013). The study authors found that the "state prevalence of firearm ownership is significantly associated with the state incidence of mass killings with firearms, school shootings, and mass shootings." Conversely, the October 2018 PLOS One study assessed the impact of state-level gun ownership rates in predicting state-level mass shooting rates and found that state-level gun ownership rates were not statistically significantly associated with the number of mass shootings in each state. The researchers tested the possibility that the relationship between gun ownership and the mass shooting rate was being confounded by gun law permissiveness and found that gun law permissiveness was only nominally correlated with gun ownership and that gun ownership was not statistically associated with the mass shooting rate with or without gun law permissiveness being adjusted.

A 2019 study published in The BMJ conducted a cross-sectional time series study of U.S. states from 1998 to 2015; the study found that "States with more permissive gun laws and greater gun ownership had higher rates of mass shootings, and a growing divide appears to be emerging between restrictive and permissive states." The study specifically found that "A 10% increase in state gun ownership was associated with a significant 35.1% (12.7% to 62.7%, P=0.001) higher rate of mass shootings. Partially adjusted regression analyses produced similar results, as did analyses restricted to domestic and non-domestic mass shootings." A 2020 study published in Law and Human Behavior examined the relationship of state guns laws and the incidence and lethality of mass shootings in the U.S. from 1976 to 2018. The study found that "laws requiring permits to purchase a gun are associated with a lower incidence of mass public shootings, and bans on large capacity magazines are associated with fewer fatalities and nonfatal injuries when such events do occur." The study specifically found that large-capacity magazine bans were associated with approximately 38% fewer fatalities and 77% fewer nonfatal injuries when a mass shooting occurred.

From 1966 to 2019, approximately 77% of mass shooters in the U.S. legally obtained the firearm used in the attacks. The researchers that compiled The Violence Project dataset found that 80% of perpetrators in school shootings obtained the firearm from family members, workplace shooters tended to use legally owned handguns, and other public shooters were more likely to acquire firearms illegally.

In a general research review on mass shootings released in 2021, RAND Corporation researchers noted that the relative rarity of mass shootings leads the statistical assumptions of the causal inference methods used in gun policy research to rarely hold and potentially result in exaggerated effect sizes and spurious effects, while high variability of characteristics of mass shootings make analysis of policies to address mass shootings subject to extremely low statistical power and unlikely to find statistically significant effects even where researchers use appropriate statistical models and where policies are effective at reducing mass shootings.

=== Perpetrator suicidality ===
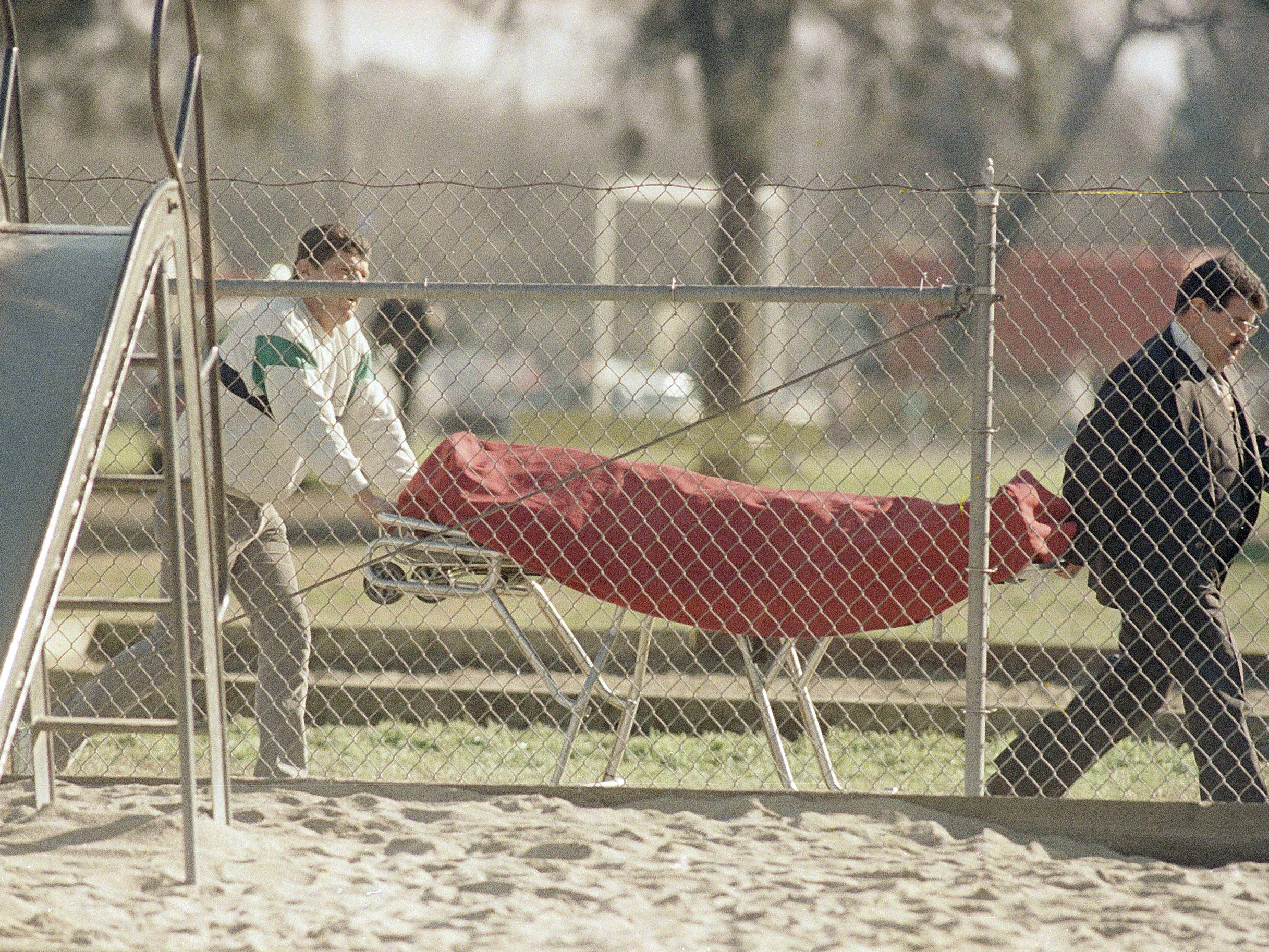
The body of the perpetrator of the 1989 Stockton schoolyard shooting being removed from the grounds of Cleveland Elementary School following his suicide.

A panel of mental health and law enforcement experts has estimated that roughly one-third of acts of mass violence—defined as crimes in which four or more people were killed—since the 1990s were committed by people with a "serious mental illness" (SMI). However, the study emphasized that people with an SMI are responsible for less than 4% of all the violent acts committed in the United States. The American Psychiatric Association (APA) states that gun violence is a public health crisis and has repeatedly noted that the overwhelming majority of people with mental illness are not violent and "are far more likely to be victims of violent crime than perpetrators of violence."

In February 2021, Psychological Medicine published a survey reviewing 14,785 publicly reported murders in English language news worldwide between 1900 and 2019 compiled in a database by psychiatrists at the New York State Psychiatric Institute and the Columbia University Irving Medical Center which found that of the 1,315 personal-cause mass murders (i.e. driven by personal motivations and not occurring within the context of war, state-sponsored or group-sponsored terrorism, gang activity, or organized crime) 11% of mass murderers and 8% of mass shooters had an SMI (e.g. schizophrenia, bipolar disorder, major depressive disorder), that mass shootings have become more common than other forms of mass murder since 1970 (with 73% occurring in the United States alone), and that mass shooters in the U.S. were more likely to have legal histories, to engage in recreational drug use or alcohol abuse, and to display non-psychotic psychiatric or neurologic symptoms.

Psychiatrist Paul S. Appelbaum argued that the data from the New York State Psychiatric Institute and Columbia University Irving Medical Center database of mass shootings show that "legal problems, substance and alcohol use, and difficulty coping with life events seem more useful foci for prevention [of mass shootings] and policy than an emphasis on serious mental illness." In 2015, psychiatrists James L. Knoll and George D. Annas cited research by social psychologists Jean Twenge and W. Keith Campbell on narcissism and social rejection in the personal histories of mass shooters, as well as cognitive scientist Steven Pinker's suggestion in The Better Angels of Our Nature (2011) that further reductions in human violence may be dependent upon reducing human narcissism. The Violence Project's comprehensive mass shooting database has shown that mass shooters share a sense of entitlement and seek scapegoats when they fail to achieve goals in life. However, psychologist Peter F. Langman has argued that while mass shooters follow similar patterns, mass shooters do not fit a single psychological profile and the characterization of mass shooters as "friendless loners" is a stereotype.

In 2018, the FBI Behavioral Analysis Unit released a survey of 63 active shooter cases between 2000 and 2013. It found that 62% of active shooters showed symptoms of mental health disorders, but those symptoms may have been "transient manifestations of behaviors and moods that would not be sufficient to warrant a formal diagnosis of mental illness" and that only one-fourth of active shooters surveyed had a formal diagnosis of any mental health disorder (and a psychotic disorder in only 3 cases). The survey concludes that given the high lifetime prevalence of the symptoms of mental illness among the U.S. population, "formally diagnosed mental illness is not a very specific predictor of violence of any type, let alone targeted violence." Psychiatrist Ronald W. Pies has suggested that psychopathology should be understood as a three-gradation continuum of mental, behavioral and emotional disturbance with most mass shooters falling into a middle category of "persistent emotional disturbance."

In 2022, Psychology, Public Policy, and Law published a study by Jillian Peterson, James Densley, and others, assessing the life history variables of 172 mass shooters from 1966 to 2019. The researchers found that symptoms of psychosis played no role in 69% of mass shootings. In the October 2018 PLOS One study, the researchers studied whether state-level SMI rates predicted state-level mass shooting rates and found that state-level SMI rates did not predict state-level mass shooting rates. In 2004, the U.S. Secret Service and the U.S. Department of Education issued a report analyzing 41 school shootings in the United States that found that 78% of the shooters surveyed had histories of suicidal ideation or attempted suicide. In its 2014 active shooter incidents review, the FBI found that 96 of the 160 incidents (60%) ended before police arrived, and in 64 incidents (40%) the shooter committed suicide.

In December 2021, the Journal of Threat Assessment and Management published a study comparing 171 public mass shooters and 63 active shooters in the United States from 1966 to 2019 (using cases compiled in The Violence Project's database) to the general population, homicide offenders, and people who die by suicide. In comparison to the general population, mass shooters were more likely to have a history of mental health issues, to have lifetime thought disorders, and greater lifetime suicidal ideation, while in comparison to general homicide offenders, mass shooters four times more frequently premeditated their homicides, eight times more frequently killed strangers, and were more likely to experience suicidal ideation and commit suicide directly or by cop. In comparison to people who committed suicide, mass shooters were actually more likely to have histories of suicidal ideation and were slightly more likely to premeditate the act. However, like the APA, the researchers emphasized that having a formal mental health disorder diagnosis is more predictive of being a victim of violence rather than a perpetrator.

In the 2021 RAND Corporation review, the researchers noted that while most research has concluded that persons with SMIs are statistically overrepresented among mass shooters, the research has not established that a causal relationship between SMIs and mass shootings exists, and that estimates of mental illness prevalence among mass shooters vary widely by the definition of mass shootings used and the methods for identifying mental illness among mass shooters. In October 2022, the Journal of Forensic Sciences published a subsequent review of 82 mass murders in the Columbia University database that at least partially occurred in academic settings that found that 68% of the mass murder perpetrators and 81% of the mass shooters did not have an SMI and that 46% of the mass shootings surveyed ended with the perpetrator committing suicide, leading the researchers to conclude that their findings "strongly suggest that focusing on mental illness, particularly psychotic illness, when talking about mass school shooting risks is missing other factors that contribute to the vast majority of cases".

In the December 2013 Journal of Forensic Sciences lone-actor terrorists survey, lone-actor attacks were rarely sudden or impulsive and the researchers have subsequently noted that a sizable subset of their subjects took preparations to maximize their chances of death by cop or suicide. Based upon the similarities in premeditation and lifetime suicidal ideation, James Densley has argued, "Many of these mass shootings are angry suicides." A 2021 cross-sectional study published in JAMA Network Open examining 170 perpetrators of mass public shootings from 1996 to 2019, found that 44% of mass shooters had leaked their plans prior to committing the act, and that "Leakage was associated with receiving counseling and suicidality, which suggests it may be best characterized as a cry for help from perpetrators prior to their act." "These findings suggest that leakage is a critical moment for mental health intervention to prevent gun violence."

=== Perpetrator life histories ===
Psychologist Jillian Peterson and James Densley co-founded The Violence Project, a National Institute of Justice-funded project in which researchers studied every mass shooting since 1966, and approximately 150 mass shooters, and coded 50 life history variables for each. Their data suggest that almost all mass shooting perpetrators had four life history variables in common: they had (1) commonly experienced early childhood trauma and exposure to violence; (2) "reached an identifiable crisis point in the weeks or months leading up to the shooting," often linked to a specific grievance; (3) researched previous mass shootings, with many being radicalized through the internet; and (4) obtained the means (firearms) to carry out the plan, with perpetrators obtaining weapons from family members in 80% of school shootings, workplace shooters tending to use legally owned handguns, and other public shooters being more likely to acquire firearms illegally. A 2021 article in the journal Injury Epidemiology found that from 2014 to 2019, 59.1% of mass shootings in the United States were related to domestic violence, and the shooter either killed a family member or had a domestic violence history in 68.2% of mass shootings.

In the December 2021 Journal of Threat Assessment and Management study, mass shooters were more likely to be unemployed and be unmarried in comparison to the general population, while in comparison to general homicide offenders, mass shooters were more likely to not be in an intimate relationship. In the December 2013 Journal of Forensic Sciences lone-actor terrorists survey, a wide range of activities and experiences preceded lone actors attacks, many but not all lone-actors were socially isolated, lone-actors regularly engaged in a detectable and observable range of activities with a wider pressure group, social movement, or terrorist organization, and a subset of 106 subjects for whom relationship data was available found that 68.9% had never married or were divorced or separated from their spouse and only 27.7% were reported to have children.

However, in the 2021 RAND Corporation review, the researchers noted that due to mass shootings having low base rates, "policies targeting individuals based on risk factors would result in an extremely high rate of false positives" and that the probability of individuals identified by even the most predictive risk factors to commit a mass shooting is "on the order of one in a million."

In a Gallup survey conducted in September and October 2020 of 1,035 randomly selected U.S. adults in all 50 states and the District of Columbia, 30% reported personally owning a firearm and 44% reported living in a household that owned at least one firearm, while the 2020 United States census enumerated the U.S. adult population to be approximately 258.3 million persons in 126.8 million households and the Gun Violence Archive recorded 610 mass shootings in the United States in the same year. The 2021 National Survey on Drug Use and Health conducted by the Substance Abuse and Mental Health Services Administration estimated that 57.8 million U.S. adults had a mental illness and 14.1 million U.S. adults had an SMI, while the Gun Violence Archive recorded 690 mass shootings in the United States in the same year. In 2022, there were 49,449 suicides in the United States (a record high) and the suicide rate in 2022 reached its highest level since 1941 at 14.3 per 100,000 persons, while the Gun Violence Archive recorded 646 mass shootings in the United States in the same year.

From 1960 to 2011, the percentage of all U.S. adults who were married declined from 72 percent to a record low of 51 percent and from 1990 to 2015 the gap in the U.S. marriage rate by educational attainment widened, while the percentage of U.S. adults over the age of 25 who had never married rose to a record high of one-fifth in 2014 (with the rate of growth in the category of never married U.S. adults over the age of 25 accelerating since 2000) and the percentage of U.S. adults living without spouses or partners rose to 42 percent by 2017. The divorce rate in the United States more than doubled from 2.2 per 1,000 people in 1960 to 5.3 per 1,000 people by 1981 and then saw a long-term decline to 2.9 per 1,000 people by 2018. The percentage of U.S. households with married couples and children declined from 40 percent in 1970 to 26 percent by 1997, which fell further to 18 percent by 2021. Also, the National Coalition Against Domestic Violence has estimated that more than 12 million Americans experience domestic violence in the U.S. each year.

=== Sociocultural factors ===
Mass shootings in the contiguous United States in 2025
Mass shootings in Hawaii in 2025
Mass shootings in Puerto Rico in 2025

Psychiatrists James L. Knoll and George D. Annas also noted that considering that mass shootings committed by perpetrators with SMIs amount to less than 1% of all gun-related homicides (and that most gun deaths in the United States are suicides rather than homicides), the tendency of most media attention following mass shootings on mental health leads to sociocultural factors being comparatively overlooked. In the October 2022 Journal of Forensic Sciences review of the Columbia University database, the researchers also concluded that "To prevent future mass school shootings, we need to begin to focus on the cultural and social drivers of these types of events... rather than on individual predictors".

British criminologist Peter Squires argued that mass shooters in Europe and the U.S. "tend to be loners with not much social support who strike out at their communities, schools and families", and noted that countries with high gun-ownership rates but greater social capital (such as Norway, Finland, Switzerland, and Israel) have fewer mass killings. In its 2014 active shooter incidents review, the FBI found that 45.6% took place in a business or commercial setting, 16.9% occurred in schools, 7.5% in institutions of higher education, 9.4% in open spaces, 6.9% in (non-military) government properties, 3.1% in military sites, 4.4% in homes, 3.8% in places of worship, and 2.5% in healthcare settings.

In 2019, the Journal of Crime & Justice published a study that found following the social disorganization theory in criminology and research on declining social capital in the United States by political scientist Robert D. Putnam that county-by-county residential instability associated with higher poverty rates and single-parent households and reduced civic engagement associated with younger populations and ethnic heterogeneity were both associated with greater mass shootings, and noted that the frequency of mass shootings in the United States had increased from 1970 to 2015 during a period Putnam identified with social capital decline in Bowling Alone (2000). A subsequent study published by the Journal of Crime & Justice in 2022 that also referenced Putnam's research on social capital found that counties in the contiguous United States with a greater number of religious congregations per capita had lower probabilities and numbers of mass shootings.

However, in the 2021 RAND Corporation review, the researchers noted that county-level characteristics that are associated with mass shootings are possibly confounded by most mass shootings occurring in urban areas. The 2023 JAMA report showed mass shootings from 2014 to 2022 and related to crime, social violence, and domestic violence occurred most frequently in the Southeastern United States and Illinois. Mass shootings that did not fit any of these categories were geographically distributed more evenly across the country. The highest rate was found in the District of Columbia (10.4 shootings per one million people), followed by much lower rates in Louisiana (4.2 mass shootings per million) and Illinois (3.6 mass shootings per million).

The 2019 Journal of Crime & Justice study found that a test of the Southern legacy of violence hypothesis found a robust negative association with mass shootings across two of four statistical models. Similarly, while Putnam did not discuss mass shootings in Bowling Alone, after constructing a state-by-state social capital index, Putnam found that the higher statewide homicide rates in the Southern United States from 1980 to 1995 in comparison to the country as a whole was entirely explained by lower rates of social capital in the region rather than a Southern culture of honor, that differences in statewide homicides rates within the region and within the Northern United States were also entirely explained by differences in social capital, and that rural communities in the country had higher civic engagement and social capital than the cities and suburbs of major metropolitan areas.

In the first edition of Bowling Alone, Putnam found that social capital in the United States sharply declined beginning in the 1960s, and that this was caused primarily by the expansion of television ownership by U.S. households (which grew from an ownership rate of 1 percent in 1948 to 75 percent by 1955), the gradual replacement of the Greatest Generation and Silent Generation birth year cohorts by the Baby boomer and Generation X birth year cohorts, and the effect of the television ownership expansion on Baby boomers and Generation X. In the afterword to the second edition of Bowling Alone (2020), Putnam found that the expansion of internet access, social media, social networking services, online dating services, professional networking services, and e-commerce was probably accelerating the decline in social capital among the U.S. population, while mostly just reinforcing existing social connections rather than creating new ones (i.e. bonding social capital versus bridging social capital)—analogously to the effect that the expansion of telephone ownership by U.S. households had (which grew from an ownership rate of 1 percent in 1890 to a majority by 1946 and to 75 percent by 1957).

Mass shooting contagion (the "copycat phenomenon") has been studied. A study published in PLOS One in 2015 examined mass shootings in the U.S. from 2005 to 2013 (and school shootings in the U.S. from 1998 to 2013). The study authors found that "significant evidence that mass killings involving firearms are incentivized by similar events in the immediate past," concluding that: "On average, this temporary increase in probability lasts 13 days, and each incident incites at least 0.30 new incidents (p = 0.0015). We also find significant evidence of contagion in school shootings, for which an incident is contagious for an average of 13 days and incites an average of at least 0.22 new incidents (p = 0.0001)."

The October 2018 PLOS One study found that state-level poverty rates and state-level population sizes did not predict state-level mass shooting rates, but did find that greater online media coverage and online search interest levels correlated with shorter intervals between any two consecutive incidents of mass shootings and the researchers concluded that their findings suggest that online media might correlate with an increasing incidence rate of mass shootings. The Violence Project's comprehensive mass shooting database has shown that mass shootings tend to occur in clusters, and that hate-motivated and fame-seeking mass shootings have increased since 2015. Steven Pinker has also noted that much of the news media in the United States has an editorial policy of "if it bleeds, it leads".

Other posited factors contributing to the prevalence of mass shootings include perpetrators' desire to seek revenge for perceived school or workplace bullying, the widespread chronic gap between people's expectations for themselves and their actual achievement, perpetrators' desire for fame and notoriety, toxic masculinity (mass shootings are perpetrated almost exclusively by men and boys), and a failure of government background checks due to incomplete databases and/or staff shortages. Feminist activist and psychotherapist Harriet Fraad and Marxian economist Richard D. Wolff contend that "American hyper-capitalism" fosters loneliness and social alienation among American men who become mass shooters. A 2019 analysis of mass shootings from 1990 to 2015 published in BMC Public Health found that communities with rising levels of income inequality are at an increased risk of mass shootings.

== Effects ==
=== Political ===
A British Journal of Political Science study first published in 2017 (and in print in 2019) found that increase in proximity to mass public shootings in the U.S. was associated with statistically significant and "substantively meaningful" increases in support for stricter gun control laws. The study also found that repeated events, magnitude, and recency of mass shootings play a role with "proximity to repeated events, more horrific events and more recent events" increasing "the salience of gun violence, and thus ... support for gun control." However, the study found that the "most powerful effects" in support or opposition to gun control "are driven by variables related to local culture, with pronounced but expected differences emerging between respondents in rural, conservative, and gun-heavy areas and those residing in urban, liberal areas with few firearm stores." A separate 2019 replication study, extending the earlier panel analysis, found no evidence that mass shootings caused a "significant or substantively meaningful main effect" on attitudes toward gun control. However, the study did find evidence that mass shootings "have polarizing effects conditional on partisanship": "That is, Democrats who live near a mass shooting even tend to become more supportive of gun control restrictions, while Republican attitudes shift in the opposite direction." The study authors concluded, "To the extent that mass shootings may affect public opinion, the result is polarizing rather than consensus building."

Research suggests that there are few, if any, effects on electoral outcomes. A 2020 study published in the American Political Science Review using data on school shootings from 2006 to 2018 concluded the incidents had "little to no effect on electoral outcomes in the United States." Although a 2021 study in the same journal covering a broader time period (1980–2016) found that the vote share of the Democratic Party increased by an average of almost 5 percentage points in counties that had experienced a "rampage-style" school shooting, these findings appear to be spurious and merely the result of the fact that shootings tend to happen in areas that were already trending Democratic rather than a response to gun violence. Both studies found no increase in voter turnout.

A 2021 study published in Proceedings of the National Academy of Sciences of the United States of America concluded that "mass shootings have a strong impact on the emotions of individuals, but the impact is politicized, limited to individuals living within the town or city where the incident occurs, and fades within a week of the incident." The study authors suggested that this phenomenon could help explain why mass shootings in the U.S. have not led to meaningful policy reform efforts.

=== Public health ===
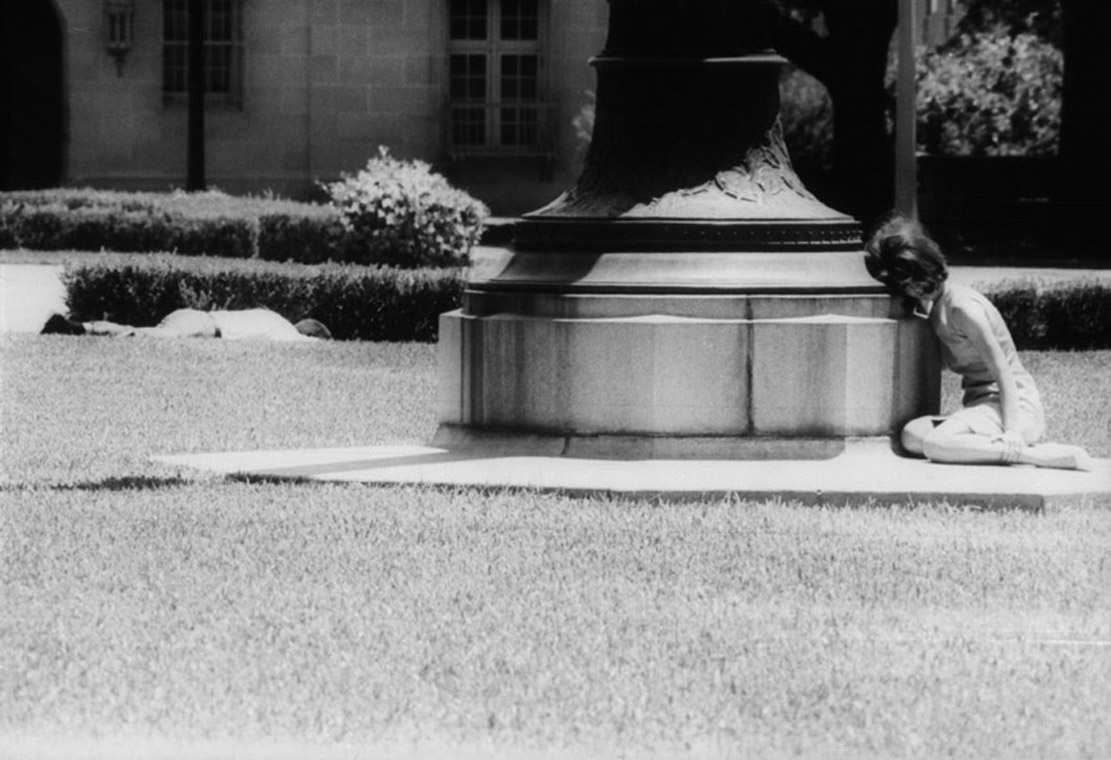
A survivor of the 1966 University of Texas tower shooting takes refuge behind a flagpole base as an injured student lies beside a hedge

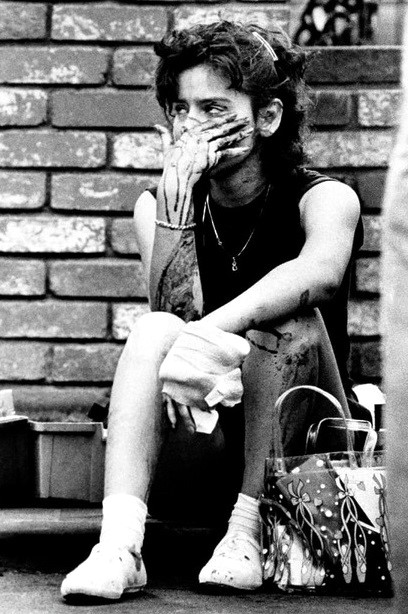
A slightly wounded survivor of the San Ysidro McDonald's massacre, pictured shortly after the incident

A review article first published online in 2015 and then printed in January 2017 in the journal Trauma, Violence, & Abuse concluded that "mass shootings are associated with a variety of adverse psychological outcomes in survivors and members of affected communities". It says that, while "the psychological effects of mass shootings on indirectly exposed populations" is less well-understood, "there is evidence that such events lead to at least short-term increases in fears and declines in perceived safety." Identified risk factors for adverse psychological outcomes have included, among others, demographics, greater proximity to the attack, acquaintance with victims, and less access to psychosocial resources.

With the aftermath of the shooting being psychological, hospitals should acquire programs or help facilities for their patients. The most vulnerable patients are children and young adults due to the fact that their brains aren't fully developed. The likelihood of them developing PTSD, depression, anxiety, suicidal thoughts, and more, are extraordinarily high. Studies show that 12.4% of mass shooting patients were diagnosed with some form of mental illness, most common being PTSD. Men show lower rates of developing PTSD unlike women who show higher rates. Men and women who fit the criteria for PTSD also showed that they gained depression.

== Deadliest mass shootings since 1949 ==
Deadliest mass shootings in the United States since 1949 (with 10 or more fatalities excluding perpetrators)

The following mass shootings are the deadliest to have occurred in modern U.S. history. Only incidents with ten or more fatalities by gunshots, excluding those of the perpetrators, are included. This list starts in 1949, the year in which Howard Unruh committed his shooting, which was the first in modern U.S. history to incur ten or more fatalities.

† Was previously the deadliest mass shooting

Rank	Incident	Year	Location	Deaths (excluding perp.)	Injuries (excluding perp.)	Type of firearm(s) used	Ref(s)
1	Las Vegas shooting	2017	Paradise, Nevada	60 (Note: Includes 2 victims who succumbed to their injuries in 2019 and 2020.)	867 approx. (413+ from gunfire or shrapnel)	Semi-automatic rifles (some outfitted with bump stocks), bolt-action rifle, and revolver	
2	Pulse nightclub shooting †	2016	Orlando, Florida	49	58 (53 from gunfire)	Semi-automatic rifle and pistol	
3	Virginia Tech shooting †	2007	Blacksburg, Virginia	32	23 (17 from gunfire)	Semi-automatic pistols	
4	Sandy Hook Elementary School shooting	2012	Newtown, Connecticut	27 (Note: Includes the perpetrator's mother at home.)	2	Semi-automatic rifle, bolt-action rifle, and pistol	
5	Sutherland Springs church shooting	2017	Sutherland Springs, Texas	26 (Note: The fatality total includes an unborn child.)	22	Semi-automatic rifle	
6	Luby's shooting †	1991	Killeen, Texas	23	27	Semi-automatic pistols	
6	El Paso Walmart shooting	2019	El Paso, Texas	23 (Note: Includes a victim who in 2020 succumbed to the injuries suffered in the shooting.)	23	Semi-automatic rifle	
8	San Ysidro McDonald's massacre †	1984	San Diego, California	22	19	Semi-automatic carbine, pistol, and pump-action shotgun	
9	Uvalde school shooting	2022	Uvalde, Texas	21	18	Semi-automatic rifle	
10	Lewiston shootings	2023	Lewiston, Maine	18	13	Semi-automatic rifle	
11	Parkland high school shooting	2018	Parkland, Florida	17	18	Semi-automatic rifle	
12	University of Texas tower shooting †	1966	Austin, Texas	15 (Note: Includes a victim who succumbed to his injuries in 2001.) (Note: Two other victims were killed by stabbing)	31	Bolt-action rifle, semi-automatic carbine, revolver, semi-automatic pistols, and semi-automatic shotgun	
13	Fort Hood shooting	2009	Fort Hood, Texas	14	32	Semi-automatic pistol and revolver	
13	San Bernardino attack	2015	San Bernardino, California	14	24	Semi-automatic rifles	
13	Columbine High School massacre	1999	Columbine, Colorado	14 (Note: Includes a victim who succumbed to her injuries in 2025.)	23 (20 from gunfire)	Semi-automatic carbine, semi-automatic pistol, double-barreled shotgun and pump-action shotgun	
13	Edmond post office shooting	1986	Edmond, Oklahoma	14	6	Semi-automatic pistols	
17	Binghamton shooting	2009	Binghamton, New York	13	4	Semi-automatic pistols	
17	Camden shootings †	1949	Camden, New Jersey	13	3	Semi-automatic pistol	
17	Wilkes-Barre shootings	1982	Wilkes-Barre, Pennsylvania	13	1	Semi-automatic rifle	
17	Wah Mee massacre	1983	Seattle, Washington	13	1	Semi-automatic pistol(s) and/or revolver(s) (Note: During the massacre, the perpetrators used three .22 caliber handguns of an unknown type that were never recovered by the authorities.)	
21	Virginia Beach shooting	2019	Virginia Beach, Virginia	12	4	Semi-automatic pistols	
21	Thousand Oaks shooting	2018	Thousand Oaks, California	12 (Note: One of the victims was killed by stray police gunfire)	16 (1 from gunfire)	Semi-automatic pistol	
21	Washington Navy Yard shooting	2013	Washington, D.C.	12	8 (3 from gunfire)	Semi-automatic pistol and shotgun	
21	Aurora theater shooting	2012	Aurora, Colorado	12	70 (58 from gunfire)	Semi-automatic rifle, pistol, and shotgun	
26	Monterey Park shooting	2023	Monterey Park, California	11	9	Semi-automatic pistol	
26	Pittsburgh synagogue shooting	2018	Pittsburgh, Pennsylvania	11	6	Semi-automatic rifle and pistols	
26	Jacksonville shooting	1990	Jacksonville, Florida	11	6	Semi-automatic carbine and revolver	
26	Palm Sunday massacre	1984	New York City, New York	11	0	Semi-automatic pistol, revolver	
26	Easter Sunday Massacre	1975	Hamilton, Ohio	11	0	Semi-automatic pistols and revolver	
30	Santa Fe High School shooting	2018	Santa Fe, Texas	10	13	Pump-action shotgun and revolver	
30	Geneva County shootings	2009	Geneva County, Alabama	10	6	Semi-automatic rifles, revolver, and shotgun	
30	Buffalo supermarket shooting	2022	Buffalo, New York	10	3	Semi-automatic rifle	
30	Boulder shooting	2021	Boulder, Colorado	10	1 (Note: The civilian injury was indirect)	Semi-automatic pistols	

== See also ==
- List of school massacres by death toll
- Gun laws in the United States
- Gun laws in the United States by state
- Gun violence in the United States
- List of rampage killers in the United States
- School shootings in the United States
  - List of school shootings in the United States (before 2000)
  - List of school shootings in the United States (2000–present)
- Spree killer
- Public opinion on gun control in the United States
- List of mass shootings in the United States in 2026
