= Keith =

Keith may refer to:

== People and fictional characters ==
- Keith (given name), includes a list of people and fictional characters
- Keith (surname)
- Keith (singer), American singer James Keefer (born 1949)
- Baron Keith, a line of Scottish barons in the late 18th century
- Clan Keith, a Scottish clan associated with lands in northeastern and northwestern Scotland

== Places ==
=== Australia ===
- Keith, South Australia, a town and locality

=== Scotland ===
- Keith, Moray, a town
  - Keith railway station
- Keith Marischal, East Lothian

=== United States ===
- Keith, Georgia, an unincorporated community
- Keith, Ohio, an unincorporated community
- Keith, West Virginia, an unincorporated community
- Keith, Wisconsin, a ghost town
- Keith County, Nebraska

== Other uses ==
- Keith F.C., a football team based in Keith, Scotland
- HMS Keith, a ship of the British Royal Navy
- Hurricane Keith, a 2000 hurricane that caused extensive damage in Central America
- Keith (film), a 2008 independent film directed by Todd Kessler
- Keith (album), a 2019 studio album by Kool Keith
- "Keith" (Kaylee Bell song), 2019
- "Keith" (Playlunch song), 2025

== See also ==
- Keith Inch, easternmost point of mainland Scotland
- Keith number, an integer that appears as a term in a linear recurrence relation with initial terms based on its own digits
- Kieth, a list of people with the given name or surname
- Dalkeith, Midlothian, a town in Scotland
