= Keith Campbell =

Keith Campbell may refer to:

- Keith Campbell (artist) (born 1964), American artist, known as Scramble Campbell
- Keith Campbell (biologist) (1954–2012), British biologist, led team that cloned Dolly the sheep
- Keith Campbell (cricketer) (born 1943), New Zealand cricketer
- Keith Campbell (ice hockey) (1909–1981), Canadian ice hockey player
- Keith Campbell (motorcyclist) (1931–1958), Australian motorcycle road racer
- Keith Campbell (philosopher) (born 1938), Australian philosopher
- Keith Campbell (rugby league), Australian rugby league footballer
- W. Keith Campbell, American social psychologist
