= Syre =

Syre may refer to:

- Syre (river), a river in Europe
- Syre, Minnesota, an unincorporated community
- Syre, Scotland, a village in the Scottish Highlands
- Syr Darya, a river in central Asia
- Syre (album), a 2017 album by Jaden Smith.
- Syre (band), a Canadian rock band
- Syriac (Estrangelo variant) (ISO 15924 code)

== See also ==
- Syer (disambiguation)
