= IGen (disambiguation) =

iGen is an alternate term for the demographic cohort Generation Z.

iGen or Igen may also refer to:

- iGen (book), a book about the generation
- Yakusan Igen (745–827), Zen Buddhist monk
