= Twenge =

Twenge is a surname. Notable people with this surname include:

- Jean Twenge (born 1971), American psychologist
- John Twenge (1319–1379), English saint
