= Vallejo (surname) =

Vallejo is a common Spanish surname. Notable people with the name include:

- Alfonso Vallejo (1943–2021), Spanish playwright, poet, painter and neurologist
- Andrés Vallejo, Ecuadorian politician
- Antonio Buero Vallejo (1916–2000), Spanish playwright associated with the Generation of '36 movement
- Boris Vallejo (born 1941), Peruvian-born American painter
- Camila Vallejo (born 1988), Chilean student leader
- Carlos Amigo Vallejo (1934–2022), O.F.M., Cardinal Priest and Archbishop of Seville
- Carmen Vallejo (1922–2013), Argentine actress and comedian
- César Vallejo (1892–1938), influential Peruvian poet
- Daniel Vallejo (born 2004), Paraguayan tennis player
- Demetrio Vallejo (1912–1985), Mexican railroad worker and union activist
- Diego Vallejo (born 1973), Spanish rally co-driver
- Elliot Vallejo (born 1984), American football player
- Fausto Vallejo (born 1949), Mexican politician
- Fernando Vallejo (born 1942), Colombian novelist and filmmaker
- Francisco Vallejo Pons (born 1982), Spanish chess Grandmaster
- Gabriel Vallejo (born 1976), Colombian politician
- Gaby Vallejo Canedo (1941–2024), Bolivian writer
- Georgette Vallejo (1908–1984), French writer and poet, wife of César Vallejo
- Iván Vallejo (born 1959), Ecuadorian mountaineer
- Jesús Vallejo (born 1997), Spanish footballer
- Joaquín Vallejo Arbeláez (1912–2005), Colombian politician and writer
- José Alberto Vallejo (born 1942), Argentine hammer thrower
- Juan Carlos Vallejo (born 1963), Spanish retired swimmer
- Juana Vallejo, Ecuadorian television producer and politician
- Keith Vallejo, former Mormon bishop
- Linda Vallejo (born 1951), American artist
- Manu Vallejo (born 1997), Spanish professional footballer
- Mariano Guadalupe Vallejo (1807–1890), California politician and general
- Maximiliano Vallejo (born 1982), Argentine soccer player
- Melanie Vallejo (born 1979), Australian actress
- Miguel Ángel Vallejo (born 1990), Mexican soccer player
- Tanner Vallejo (born 1994), American football player
- Tito Vallejo (born 1948), Gibraltarian historian and former military officer
- Virginia Vallejo (born 1949), Colombian writer, journalist, columnist, media personality and socialite

== Fictional characters ==
- Junior Commissioner Vallejo, a fictional character from the cartoon Fillmore!

== See also ==
- Vallejos (surname)
- Vallejo (disambiguation)
