= Keith Urban (disambiguation) =

Keith Urban (born 1967) is a New Zealand-Australian country singer, songwriter, and record producer.

Keith Urban may also refer to:

- Keith Urban (1991 album), his debut studio album
- Keith Urban (1999 album), his second studio album

== See also ==
- Keith Urbahn, American literary agent, speech writer, and U.S. Navy intelligence officer
- Keith (given name)
- Urban (surname)
