= Syers =

Syers is a surname. Notable people with this surname include:

- Cecil Syers (1903–1981), British civil servant and diplomat
- Dave Syers (born 1987), English footballer
- Edgar Syers (1863–1946), British figure skater
- Keith Syers (1939–2011), New Zealand academic and academic administrator
- Madge Syers (1881–1917), British figure skater
- Mark Hsu Syers (1952—1983), American actor

== See also ==
- Syer (disambiguation)
