= Keith Slater (disambiguation) =

Keith Slater (1935–2025) was a former Western Australian footballer and cricketer.

- Keith Slater (bishop) (born 1949), Australian bishop
- Keith Slater (rugby league) (fl. 1960s–1970s), English rugby league footballer
- Keith Slatter (fl. 1960s), English rugby league footballer
