= Keith Taylor =

Keith Taylor may refer to:

== Politicians ==
- Keith Taylor (British politician) (1953–2022), English politician
- Charles Keith Taylor (born 1931), known as Keith Taylor, Canadian politician

== Sportspeople ==
- Keith Taylor (safety) (born 1964), American football player
- Keith Taylor (cornerback) (born 1998), American football player

== Others ==
- Keith Taylor (author) (born 1946), Australian science fiction and fantasy writer
- Keith Taylor (historian) (born 1946), American sinologist, historian and writer
- Keith Taylor (poet) (born 1951), Canadian poet, translator and professor
- Keith Taylor (political scientist) (1949–2006), British political scientist
- Keith A. Taylor (born 1961), United States Coast Guard admiral
