= Public opinion on gun control in the United States =

U.S. opinion on gun control issues is deeply divided along political lines, as shown in this 2021 survey.

Public opinion on gun control in the United States has been tracked by numerous organizations and newspapers for more than thirty years. Various gun control proposals have been suggested over this interval, with associated public polling. Mass shootings and school shootings have affected public opinion polling results.

== History ==
=== 1990s ===
A 1995 poll performed a few months after Bill Clinton signed into law the Federal Assault Weapons Ban, 58% of Americans were "worried that the government still would not do enough to regulate access to guns", while 35% of Americans "worried that the government would go too far".

=== 2012 ===
A Pew Research Center poll conducted shortly after the 2012 Aurora, Colorado shooting found that 47% of Americans supported controlling gun ownership over protecting the right to gun ownership, while 46% said that protecting the rights of gun owners was more important.

Six days after the Sandy Hook Elementary School shooting in 2012, another Pew Research Center poll found that 49% of Americans felt that controlling gun ownership was more important than protecting gun rights, while 42% of Americans felt the opposite. This trend of stricter gun control policy was similarly shown by a Gallup poll that was taken in December 2012. With the question being "In general, do you feel that the laws covering the sale of firearms should be made more strict, less strict or kept as they are now?" the result was 58% of respondents in favor of stricter laws, 6% supporting less strict laws, and 34% in favor of keeping laws the same. This marked the first time that polling found more Americans supporting gun control than supporting gun rights since President Barack Obama took office in 2009.

=== 2013 ===
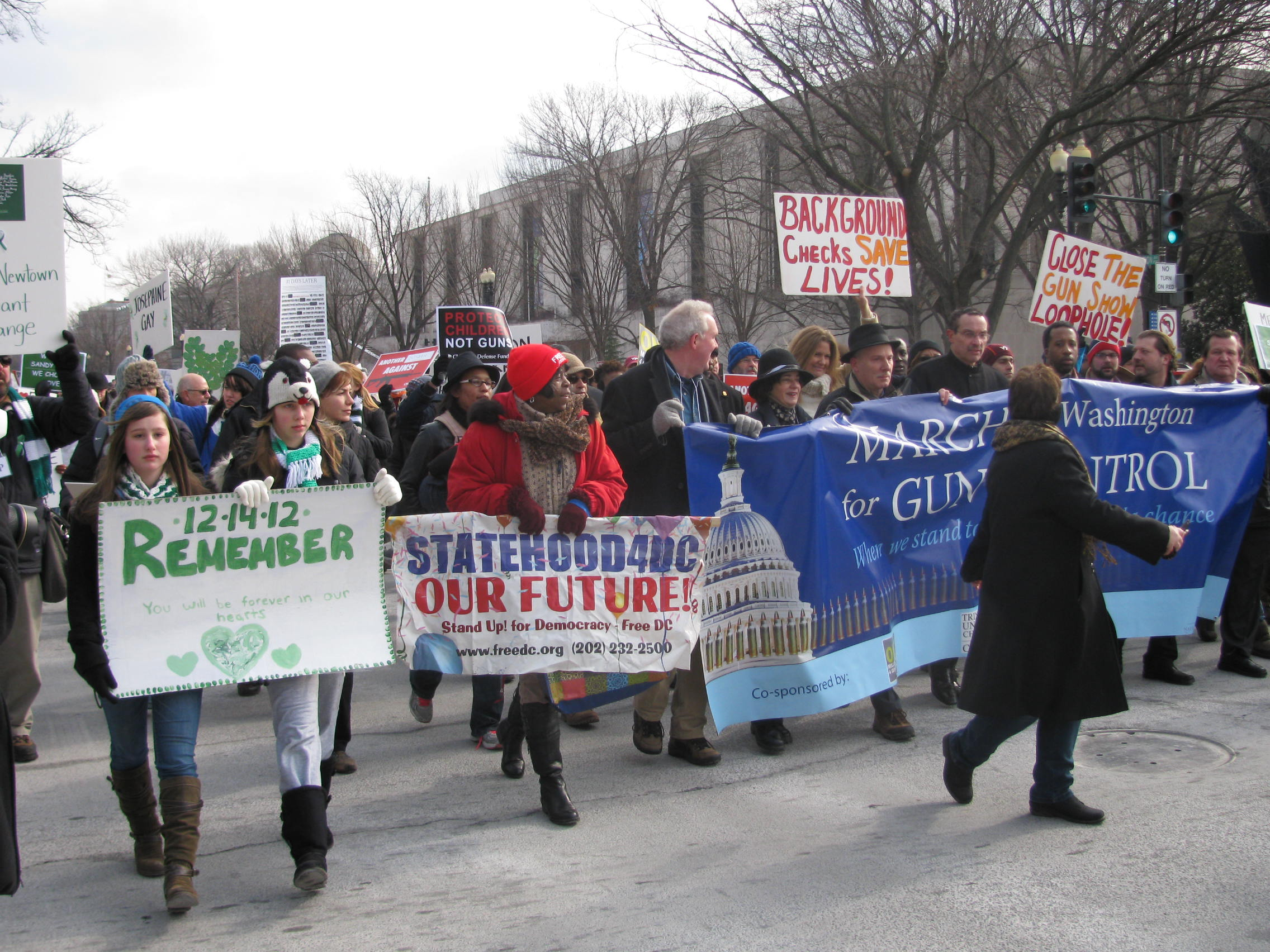
March on Washington for Gun Control (2013)

In 2013, a majority of Americans, both gun owners and non-gun owners, expressed support for a wide range of policies to reduce gun violence. These measures included improving background checks for gun sales, banning certain dangerous people from having guns, better oversight of gun dealers, and preventing the mentally ill from owning guns. 89% of the public in general, and 84% of gun owners, expressed support for background checks for all gun sales. One of the concerns raised in the 2013 study was that public opinion in the months after Sandy Hook was uniquely shaped by the tragedy.

=== 2014 ===
In December 2014, a well-known survey conducted by the Pew Research Center seemed to validate this idea (Pew Research Center, 2014). The survey posed the question, "[W]hat do you believe is of greater significance - safeguarding the rights of Americans to possess firearms or regulating gun ownership?" Out of the respondents, 52% expressed their support for the rights of gun owners, marking a 7-point rise from the same question asked in January 2013.

=== 2015 ===
A poll conducted by CBS News and New York Times in October 2015 found that 92% of Americans supported "universal background checks for all gun sales".

Pew Research Center poll in August 2015 can be looked at as well for asking surveyors based on partisan lines about background checks for gun shows and private sales. Polling from the research center show that Republicans (79%) and Democrats (88%) want background checks for gun show transactions and private sales. This bipartisan view also is expanded upon for barring mentally ill stricken people from obtaining a firearm, with Democrats being 81% and Republicans being 79% in favor of this gun control proposal.

While there is a more concise statistical agreement upon background checks for all gun sales, there is a growth in people looking at the rights of gun owners. From a Pew Research Center poll that came out in August 2015 there has been a change in opinion on how people view gun rights vs controlling gun ownership. Throughout the various years (2008, 2011) when polling on this topic took place, there was a steady stance on the belief that controlling gun ownership should come before gun rights. In 2008 there was a 49% vs. 45% poll which favored control of gun ownership, as well as in 2011 there was a concurrent agreement of the last poll but with the numbers of 51% to 45%. This would change when the polling topic would be surveyed again in 2014 and published in 2015. The poll found that 52% had the view of protecting gun rights to 46% of people supporting control of gun ownership.

=== 2016 ===
After the Orlando nightclub shooting in June 2016, NBC News and The Wall Street Journal released the results of a poll which found that 50% of Americans were more concerned the government would go too far in regulating guns, while 47% of Americans were more concerned that the government would not do enough to regulate guns. A CBS News poll conducted the same month found that 57% of Americans supported a federal assault weapons ban, 13 percentage points higher than a previous poll they conducted in December 2015 (after the San Bernardino shooting). Also in June 2016, a CNN/Opinion Research Corporation poll found that about 90% of Americans supported universal background checks.

Polling on gun control proposals was politicized through the 2016 presidential elections. In August 2016 the Pew Research Center conducted a poll to compare opinions on gun control policy proposals between those of Hillary Clinton supporters and Donald Trump supporters. The research examined opinions on six topics. On expanding background checks, 75% of Trump supporters and 90% of Clinton supporters were in favor. On preventing firearm sales to the mentally ill, there was broad agreement, with Trump supporters 82% in favor, and Clinton supporters 83% in favor. On barring purchase for those on federal watch and terror lists, 72% of Trump supporters favored the proposal, with 80% of Clinton supporters in favor. On the proposal for a federal database tracking gun sales, 46% of Trump supporters were in favor, while 85% of Clinton supporters were in favor. On a ban on high capacity ammunition "clips", 34% of Trump supporters were in favor, while 75% of Clinton supporters were in favor. On a proposal to ban assault-style weapons, 34% of Trump supporters were in favor, with 74% of Clinton supporters in favor.

=== 2017 ===
A 2018 study looking at a January 2017 survey results find "For 23 of the 24 policies examined, most respondents supported restricting or regulating gun ownership. Only 8 of 24 policies had greater than a 10-point support gap between gun owners and non-gun owners."

On October 11, 2017, ten days after a mass shooting in Las Vegas killed 58 people, a Politico/Morning Consult poll was released. It found that 64% of Americans support stricter gun laws, while 29% opposed them. Support was higher among Democrats (83%) than among independents (58%) and Republicans (49%).

Another topic that came up in the discussion of gun control is the question of should teachers be armed in the classroom for school shooting scenarios. A Pew Research Center poll was conducted in March and April of that year. The results looked a range of adults such as parents and non-parents, gun owners and non-gun owners, and lastly on partisan lines. The survey came back to show that more adults (55%) opposed teacher having guns while (45%) favored. In the category of parents and non parents, there was more favorably to oppose teachers having guns in the classroom. Parents opposing would represent (53%) and non-parents (56%). The category of gun-owners and non-gun owners show that gun owners would support the measure with the result of (66%) and among non-gun owners they oppose the measure of teachers having guns (64%). The results that stemmed from the basis of partisan lines was that Republicans (69%) supported the measure and between Democrats (71%) opposed having guns with teachers and officials in schools.

=== 2018 ===
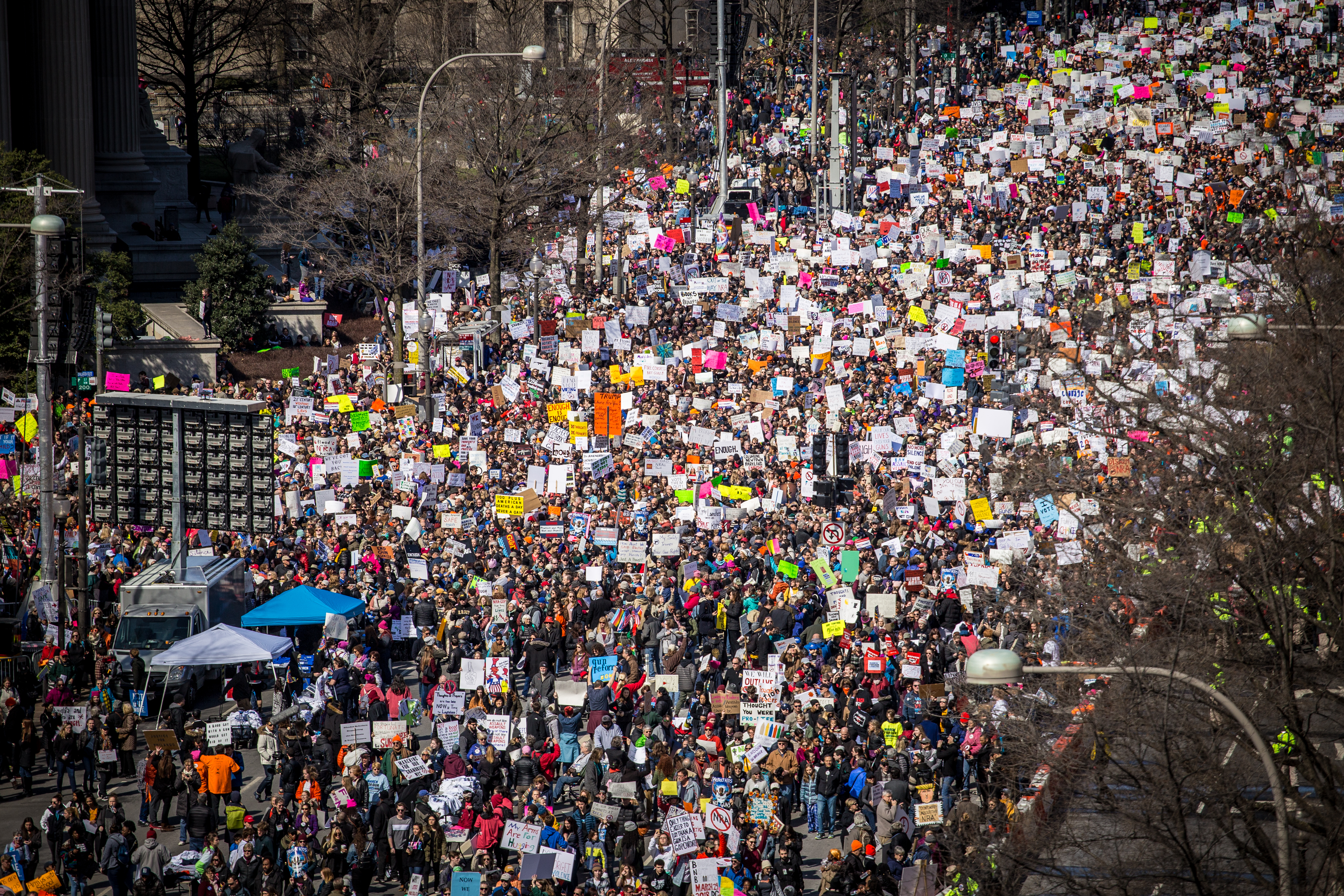
Gun violence protests, on gun control laws. (March for Our Lives)

On February 21, 2018, eight days after the Stoneman Douglas High School shooting killed 17 people, some surviving students rallied for stricter gun control policies in Tallahassee, Florida, the state's capital and then again asked for the same gun restrictions at a CNN Town Hall later that day. The events led to students across the nation showing their solidarity by walking out of their individual high schools and marching with the survivors. A House Committee vote approved the bill to raise the age from 18 to 21 years old as the minimum age to buy and own a rifle in the state of Florida. As well as, creating a three-day waiting period for all gun purchases. The same bill proposed creating a program which allows teachers who have successfully completed law enforcement training and are deputized by the local county sheriff to carry weapons that are concealed within the classroom, if approved by the school district.

In February 2018, 66% of American voters supported stricter gun laws, in a Quinnipiac University Polling Institute poll with a margin of error of +/- 3.4%, the highest level of support measured since 2008. 70% of American adults supported stricter gun laws, according to a CNN poll with a margin of error of +/- 3.7%. 75% of American adults supported stricter gun laws, according to an NPR/Ipsos poll with a margin of error of +/- 3.5%. 65% of Americans support stricter gun laws, according to a CBS News poll with a margin of error of +/- 4%. In March 2018, 67% of Americans supported stricter regulation of firearms sales, according to a Gallup poll, the highest in any Gallup survey since 1993.

On March 14, 2018, many schools around the country took part in the Enough! National School Walkout to protest the NRA and current United States gun laws. The nationwide movement started around 10:00 A.M in each time zone and lasted about 17 minutes, each minute representing a victim of the Stoneman Douglas shooting. During the protest, students from different schools took part in many acts of remembrance such as: holding a moment of silence, reading out the names of the victims, or spelling out the rallying cry of the movement—"Enough." However, several schools around the country did not let the activism go unpunished. Students faced anywhere from three-hour detention to five-day suspension for protesting.

Following the 2018 Santa Fe High School shooting, activists in favor of gun control drew parallels between it and the earlier Stoneman Douglas High School shooting. Twitter user Fred Guttenberg, whose daughter Jaime was killed in the Stoneman Douglas shooting, cited this incident as part of a pattern, saying "Now, we have 8 more children dead and our leadership in Washington has done nothing." Reaction among students from Santa Fe has been more mixed, with some students such as Callie Wylie stating that violence is not a "gun problem". A round table hosted by Governor Greg Abbott of Texas, involving students, politicians, and activists, focused less on gun control than on "greater police presence on school campuses and improved strategies to deal with mental health problems".

In greater response to the Stoneman Douglas through an article of CNN that was updated June 13, 2018 there has been a growth in states to respond in how they will control guns in the future. States such as New York, Florida, Nebraska, New Jersey, Washington, Illinois, Vermont, Oregon, Rhode Island, and Connecticut to expand on gun control measures. These measures range from state to state on banning bump stocks, stricter mental health checks, using the legal age to buy a weapon to 21, restricting standard-capacity firearm magazines to 15 or 10 rounds, and even the measure of city ordinances banning assault style weapons. On the federal level even, there was a move by President Donald Trump in March 2018 to prohibit the sale of bump stocks.

Politicians and the public alike have grown increasingly apart in the wake of recent events and tragedies. Many states have started passing legislation to change gun control in America which has led to an increased debate about the topic. Oregon, Washington, Florida, and Rhode Island have all passed legislation that increased gun restrictions in their states in 2018. According to David Owens, these laws all favor ideas presented by Democrats and have been met with backlash from Republicans in the area. On the other side of the coin, two school districts in Connecticut have hired armed guards to be present at the school at all times in order to have an immediate officer on the scene in the event of a shooting. Republicans have supported this idea but Democrats feel that adding more armed people to situations only makes them more dangerous.

=== 2019 ===
An August 2019 Fox News poll of registered voters found 90% of respondents favored universal background checks, 81% supported taking guns from at-risk individuals, and 67% favored banning assault weapons.

A September 2019 study in Health Affairs concludes "our findings indicate that large majorities of both gun owners and non-gun owners strongly support a range of measures to strengthen US gun laws".

=== 2020 ===
According to Gallup, in 2020, 32% of report owning a gun, and 44% live in a household in which at least one member owns a gun. Besides, in the mentioned year, gun-related homicides is said that rose even 35 percent to the highest number on record in the United States, the highest level in more than 25 years. In this year, more than 16.6 million Americans have bought weapons, and there are 120 guns per 100 people in the United States.

=== 2021 ===
According to a Pew Research Center poll, "roughly half of Americans (53%) favor stricter gun laws, which was a decline since 2019".

Also, according to a survey by the University of Chicago's Harris School of Public Policy and the Associated Press-NORC Public Relations Research Center: the majority of American adults (71%) want stricter gun control regulations and think that violence has increased across the country.

=== 2022 ===
A May 2022 Politico/Morning Consult poll found respondents supporting:

- background checks on all gun sales, by a net 80 percentage points;
- creation of a national database with information about each gun sale, by a net 57 points;
- banning of assault-style weapons, by a net 42 points;
- closing the gun show loophole, by a net 70 points;
- requiring gun owners to store their guns in a safe storage unit, by a net 62 points.

Following the racially motivated Buffalo grocery store shooting that killed ten black people and the Robb Elementary School shooting that killed nineteen students and two teachers in May 2022, Gallup reported in June 2022 that 66% of Americans support stricter gun laws and 55% also support the enforcement of existing laws in addition to the passage of new laws. A June 2022 ABC News/Ipsos poll found that 70% of Americans believed enacting new gun control laws was more important than protecting gun ownership rights. Regarding the impending 2022 midterm elections, Gallup reported that 55% of voters said gun policy is "extremely important", while 8% of voters said that gun control was the country's chief issue.

=== 2023 ===
Gun-related suicides and homicides in the United States

In the midst of a recent surge in mass shootings, including a record 46 school shootings in 2022, an April 2023 Fox News poll found registered voters were "overwhelmingly" supportive of a range of gun restrictions. Measures supported by the majority of respondents included criminal background checks (87%), mental health evaluations of prospective gun owners (80%), a 30-day waiting period for every purchase (77%), and a law against civilian ownership of semiautomatic weapons (61%).

According to joint polls published by CNN and the SSRS Institute: 64% of Americans support stricter gun control laws, 36% oppose it. 54% of Americans believe that such laws will reduce the number of deaths and killings of citizens with firearms, and 58% believe that the government can take effective action to prevent mass shootings. 36% believe the presence of guns makes public places less safe, 32% believe allowing gun owners to carry their guns in public makes those places safer, and 32% believe it makes no difference. The results had a margin for error of plus or minus 3.7 points.

== Predictors ==
A 2007 study found that an index of individualism and collectivism predicted both gun ownership and attitudes toward gun control in the United States.

== See also ==
- Mass shootings in the United States
- Gun violence in the United States
- Gun law in the United States
- School shooting
