= Valeo (disambiguation) =

Valeo is a French global automotive supplier.

Valeo may also refer to:

- Francis R. Valeo (1916–2006), the Secretary of the United States Senate
- Valeo Foods, Irish multinational producer of branded food and beverage products

== See also ==
- Vallejo (disambiguation)
- Vale (disambiguation)
