= Syer =

Syer may refer to:

== People ==
- Henry Syer Cuming (1817–1902), British collector
- John Syer (1815–1885), English painter
- John Syer Bristowe (1827–1895), English physician
- Syer Bars, former member of Roll Deep
- William Syer Bristowe (1901–1979), English arachnologist who wrote under the name W. S. Bristowe

== Other ==
- Syer-Tenyer language, spoken in Burkina Faso

== See also ==
- Syers
- Syre (disambiguation)
