= Vallejo =

Vallejo may refer to:

== Places ==
- Vallejo, California, United States, named after Mariano Guadalupe Vallejo
  - Vallejo Station, an inter-modal transit station in the city
- Vallejo Estate, Sonoma, California, a house and grounds on the National Register of Historic Places
- Vallejo Flour Mill, Fremont, California, a California Historical Landmark
- Estadio de Vallejo, Valencia, Spain, a now closed stadium
- Vallejo metro station (Spanish: Estación Vallejo), a station along Line 6 of the Mexico City Metro

== Ships ==
- USS Vallejo, several ships of the United States Navy
- Vallejo (ferry), an 1879 houseboat and former ferry

== Other uses ==
- Vallejo (surname), including a list of people with the name
- Vallejo (band), a rock band based in Austin, Texas
  - Vallejo (album)
- Vallejo, a 1995 song by Ween first released on the Voodoo Lady EP

== See also ==
- Vallejos (disambiguation)
- Valeo (disambiguation)
