= Vallejos =

Vallejos may refer to:

- Vallejos (surname), including a list of people with the name
- Vallejos v. Commissioner of Registration, 2011 right of abode case in Hong Kong

== See also ==
- Vallejo (disambiguation)
