= Vallejos (surname) =

Vallejos is a Spanish-language surname, roughly meaning "little valleys". Notable people with the surname include:

- Carlos Vallejos Sologuren (born 1940), Peruvian physician and politician
- Catalina Vallejos (born 1989), Chilean television personality
- Daniel Vallejos (born 1981), Costa Rican footballer
- Fabiana Vallejos (born 1985), Argentine women's footballer
- Leopoldo Vallejos (born 1944), Chilean retired footballer
- Lyna Vallejos (born 1993/1994), Argentine gamer, writer and YouTuber
- Roque Vallejos (1943-2006), Paraguayan poet
- Tomás Vallejos (born 1984), Argentine rugby union player
- Veronica Vallejos (born 1967), Chilean scientist

== See also ==
- Vallejo (surname)
- Vallejos (disambiguation)
