= James Alan Fox =

American criminologist

- Born: December 22, 1951 (age 74); Boston, Massachusetts, United States
- Education: University of Pennsylvania
- Occupations: Professor, Criminology
- Employer: Northeastern University
- Known for: Criminology
- Notable work: Statistics
- Spouse: Sue Ann Fox
- Website: http://jamesalanfox.com

James Alan Fox is a Professor of Criminology, Law, and Public Policy and former dean at Northeastern University in Boston, Massachusetts, in the United States. Fox holds a bachelor's degree in sociology (1972), a master's degree in criminology (1974), a master's degree in statistics (1975), and a Ph.D. in sociology (1976), all from the University of Pennsylvania.

Fox has written 18 books, including Extreme Killing: Understanding Serial and Mass Murder, The Will to Kill: Making Sense of Senseless Murder, and Violence and Security on Campus: From Preschool through College. He has published dozens of journal and magazine articles, primarily in the areas of serial murder, mass shootings, intimate partner homicide, youth crime, school and campus violence, workplace violence, and capital punishment, and was the founding editor of the Journal of Quantitative Criminology. He has published over 300 op-ed columns in newspapers around the country, including the New York Times, Washington Post, Los Angeles Times, and USA Today. As a member of its Board of Contributors, his opinion columns appear frequently in USA Today. Before that, he wrote a bi-weekly column in the Boston Herald and the Crime and Punishment blog for the Boston Globe. He is also one of the principals in maintaining the Associated Press/USA Today, Northeastern University Mass Killing Database.

Fox is known as "The Dean of Death," for his research on mass murders. USA Today says that "Fox is arguably the nation's leading criminologist." As an authority on homicide, he appears regularly on national television and radio programs, including the Today Show, Meet the Press, Dateline, 20/20, and 48 Hours. He has been a guest numerous times on Oprah.

Fox often gives lectures and expert testimony, including more than a dozen appearances before the United States Congress, and White House meetings with the President. He served on President Bill Clinton’s advisory committee on school shootings, and a Department of Education Expert Panel on Safe, Disciplined and Drug-Free Schools.

Fox has served as a visiting fellow with the Bureau of Justice Statistics of the U.S. Department of Justice, and an NBC News Analyst. He also chaired a blue-ribbon panel for the city of Seattle investigating the 2006 Capitol Hill massacre.

Fox was honored in 2007 by the Massachusetts Committee Against the Death Penalty with the Hugo Adam Bedau Award for excellence in capital punishment scholarship and by Northeastern University with the 2008 Klein Lectureship.

== Books published ==
- Extreme Killing: Understanding Serial and Mass Murder (Sage, 2013)
- The Will to Kill: Making Sense of Senseless Murder (Sage, 2019)
- Randomized Response and Related Methods (Sage, 2015)
- Elementary Statistics in Social Research (Pearson, 2014)
- Elementary Statistics in Criminal Justice Research (Pearson, 2014)
- Violence and Security on Campus: From Preschool through College (ABC-CLIO, 2010)
- Dead Lines: Essays in Murder and Mayhem (Allyn & Bacon, 2001)
