= Syre (band) =

- Origin: Canada
- Genre: Rock
- Years active: 1986–present
- Members: Doug Weir; Chip Gall; Rick Mead; Chris Caron; Jamie Constant

Syre is a Canadian rock band composed of Doug Weir (vocals) Chip Gall (guitar, keyboards, vocals), Rick Mead (lead guitar, vocals), Chris Caron (bass, vocals), and Jamie Constant (drums). The band released two albums in the 1990s, toured in Canada and the United States, as of 2017 is continuing to perform locally.

== History ==
Syre formed in 1986. The band released the songs "Never Said Goodbye" and "Say Hi To My Girlfriend" as singles with videos.

Syre was managed by WSMI (William Seip management (Helix)), in particular, Eric Guillespe. Syre played in clubs and bars around Canada and toured in the U.S.

Syre signed with A&M Records (Red Light records U.S) in 1989, and released an album It Ain't Pretty Being Easy. With a mixture of rocking tunes and slower songs, the album appeared on the RPM 100 Albums chart that year. The band released singles from the album, "In Your Eyes" which was listed on the RPM Canadian Content chart in December that year, and "You Never Look Back", which appeared on the RPM Top Singles chart in October. The band toured extensively in support of the album.

Syre recorded an album, "Pissed to the gills" in 1993, but it sat unreleased for five years, until the band released it on their own label, Golden Garbage Can, in 1998.

As of 2017 the band maintains its original lineup and in recent years does live shows mostly for charities. It Ain't Pretty Being Easy was re-issued by Demon Doll Records and Metal Legacy Records in 2016, and Pissed to the Gills was reissued in 2017.
