= Keith Woodrow =

Keith Woodrow (27 August 1927 – 27 December 1997) was a Scottish native who rose from being a former constable in Argyllshire in 1954 to Senior Superintendent of the colonial Royal Hong Kong Police Force at the time of his retirement in 1975.

== Career ==
In tribute to Woodrow's more than two decades of service in Hong Kong, which ended with his retirement in 1975 as Senior Superintendent, he was awarded the Colonial Police Long Service Medal and 1st Clasp, and was commended by the Commissioner of Police on several occasions.

== Death ==
Woodrow return to Scotland after his police career in Hong Kong. He died suddenly at the end of 1997 in Edinburgh, Scotland, aged 70. His funeral took place at Kirn Parish Church, Dunoon, and he was buried in Kilmun Cemetery. He was survived by his wife, Morag.
