= Keith Walters =

Keith Walters was the dean of science and Mathematics at Valdosta State University. until his arrest for possessing child pornography. He is no longer employed at Valdosta State University. Prior to this, Walters was the Chair of the Department of Chemistry & Biochemistry at Northern Kentucky University.
