= IGen (book) =

2017 nonfiction book by Jean Twenge

iGen
- Author: Jean Twenge
- Language: English
- Subject: Social science
- Publisher: Atria Books
- Publication date: 2017
- Publication place: United States
- Media type: Print (hardback and paperback)
- ISBN: 9781501151989

iGen (Note: Full book's title: iGen: Why Today's Super-Connected Kids Are Growing Up Less Rebellious, More Tolerant, Less Happy—and Completely Unprepared for Adulthood—and What That Means for the Rest of Us. "and What That Means for the Rest of Us" is represented as a footnote indicated by an asterisk.) is a 2017 book by Jean Twenge that studies the lifestyles, habits and values of Americans born 1995–2012, the first generation to reach adolescence after smartphones became widespread. Twenge refers to this generation, more commonly known as Generation Z, as iGen. Although she argues there are some positive trends, she expresses concern that the generation is being isolated by technology.

== Content ==
In iGen, Jean Twenge examines the advantages, disadvantages and consequences of technology in the lives of the generation of teens/young adults. She argues that generational divides are more prominent than ever and parents, educators and employers have a strong desire to understand the newer generation. Social media and texting have replaced many face-to-face social activities that older generations grew up with, therefore, iGen has spent less time interacting in person. Twenge concludes this has led them to experience higher levels of anxiety, depression, and loneliness than seen in prior generations.

She argues that use of technology is not the only thing that distinguishes Gen Z from generations prior— the way in which their time is spent contributes to changes in their behaviors and attitudes toward religion, sexuality and politics. Twenge argues that Zoomers' socialization skills and wants for the future have taken a turn towards an atypical, yet safe route. She elaborates on these topics throughout different chapters of the book. Each of these changes factor into her overall argument: that iGen is unlike any generation seen before, and earlier generations must learn to understand them in order to keep up. With their new developmental ways, their impact will be unlike any before them.

Her evaluations of iGen are based on four databases: Monitoring the Future, The Youth Risk Behavior Surveillance System, The American Freshman Survey, and the General Social Survey. Each of these surveys asked Zoomers quantitative and qualitative questions to determine if being raised synergistically with technology has made them less rebellious, more tolerant, less happy, less resilient to the challenge of adulthood, as Twenge asserts. In addition to the databases, Twenge conducted interviews with young adults across the country to collect first hand data about the challenges growing up with technology being presented to the generation of teens and young adults.

== Reception ==
Sonia Livingstone at the London School of Economics wrote that the book attracted "an avalanche of both eulogistic and critical reviews." She was cautious about Twenge's findings, noting some graphs that did not fit them and suggesting other potential factors were at play. She did agree that there had been a recent downturn of mental health among the youth and concluded: "Let's hope the questions raised here foster more and better research about and with young people growing up in the digital age."

Marilyn Gates gave the book a positive review in the New York Journal of Books, calling it "an important barometer of youth mental health" and "a must-read for parents, teachers, employers, and anybody trying to make sense of iGen behavior and what this bodes for the future." She described Twenge as a "highly skilled and empathetic interviewer", and also praised her writing for being easy to understand. She highlighted some flaws, such as data cherry-picked "for maximum shock value", correlation being treated as causation and that it did not entirely avoid "youth bashing".

Annalisa Quinn at NPR was skeptical, arguing that the book was part of the familiar trend of older generations feeling superior to younger ones ("one of our great human traditions"). She was particularly critical of how Twenge "draws her conclusions first and then collects evidence that supports those conclusions, ignoring evidence that doesn't." In the United Arab Emirates newspaper The National, Steve Donoghue said it drew alarmist conclusions despite data on the contrary. He wrote: "Even Twenge's own charts and numbers, read with optimism, tend to indicate that members of iGen are generally far more socially aware, far less given to prejudice, and far, far sharper than their parents."

== See also ==
- The Coddling of the American Mind
- Digital media use and mental health
