= Kieth =

Kieth is the given name or surname of:

- Kieth Engen (1925–2004), American operatic bass
- Kieth Hymmen (1913–1978), Canadian politician
- Kieth Merrill (born 1940), American film writer, director and producer
- Kieth O'dor (1962–1995), British racing driver
- Sam Kieth (1963–2026), American comics writer and illustrator and film director

== See also ==
- Keith (given name)
- Keith (surname)
