= Keith Liddell =

American boxer

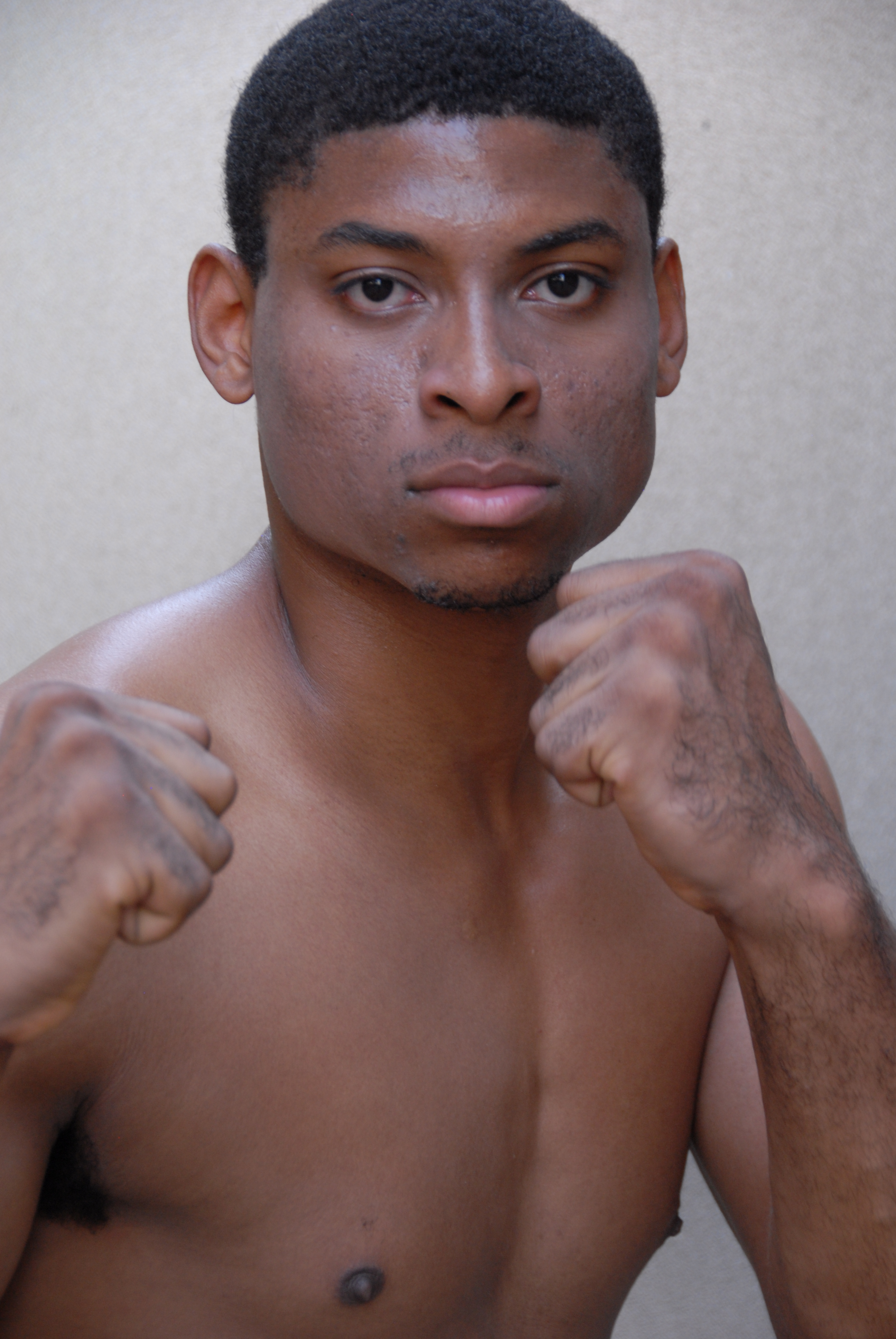
- Born: Chicago, Illinois
- Occupation: Boxer

Keith Liddell is an American professional boxer. He holds the record for the "fastest punch" in the Guinness World Records. The punch was registered at 45 miles per hour. In 2012, he qualified for the summer Olympics in London, United Kingdom.

== Bibliography ==
- The Tangibility of Nothingness (2011) (ISBN 1467957852)
