= Keith Paterson =

British Internet celebrity

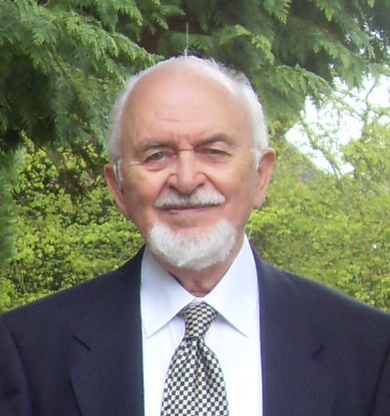
- Born: 22 November 1931 (age 94)
- Spouse: Pat Paterson
- Website: www.silverhairs.co.uk

Keith Paterson (born 22 November 1931) received an MBE in the Queen's 2015 New Year Honours list "for services to promoting information technology to elderly people in the UK".

== Biography ==
Paterson first started using computers when he bought an original IBM PC in 1982 and acquired a degree from the Open University. He was employed in a career office in Cambridge and was responsible for deploying computers throughout the organisation's network.

Since 2000, he has been running a website called Silverhairs...a helpline for silver surfers to help elderly people with their computer problems.

In 2012, Paterson was elected Age UK's joint internet champion together with Brenda O'Mulloy. In May 2012, he received a "Digital Leader" award from Go On UK.

As of 2012, Paterson lives in Newmarket, Suffolk.
