= Keith Forde =

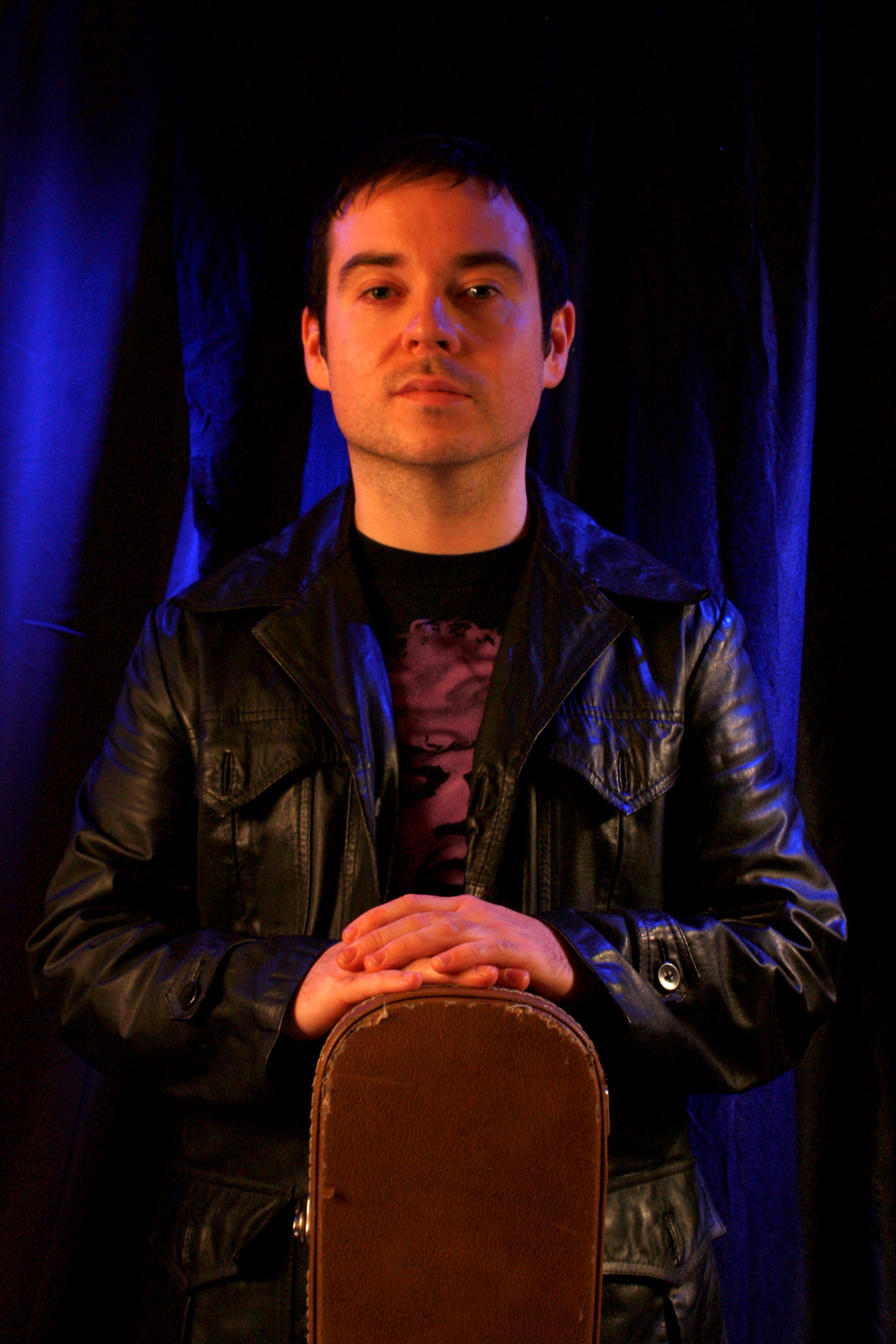

Background information
- Origin: Limerick, Ireland
- Genres: Folk rock
- Occupation(s): Musician, songwriter
- Instrument(s): Vocals, guitar
- Years active: 1999–present
- Website: keithforde.com

Keith Forde is a singer-songwriter and musician from Limerick, Ireland.

== Early career – Sutras ==
Forde began his musical career as a guitarist with Irish pop-rock band Sutras. The band started out by winning the 1999 Heineken battle of the bands competition. They went on to release two EPs and three singles: Sutras Live (1999), An Audience with (2000), Princess (2001), The Lonely Ones (2002) and Believe (2003). Princess reached number 27 and The Lonely Ones reached number 40 on the Official Irish Charts. Believe was a radio release and was never officially released as a single. The B side of the Princess single, Machine won the 2002 Hot Press Song of the Year Award. The Lonely Ones went on to be placed number 3 in the 2003 Today FM / Witnness Rising Songs of the Year, ahead of The Libertines and The Thrills. The band were voted as one of the most promising new acts in the 2003 Hot Press year end annual poll. The band also got to the finals of the O2 New Band Competition and the National Student Music Awards. They toured with acts such as Bell X1, The Thrills, The Frames and Rubyhorse. They toured across Ireland and played at In the City (festival) in Manchester. The band broke up at the beginning of 2004.

== Vesta Varro ==
In 2004, Forde co-formed alternative/rock band Vesta Varro, again playing guitar. The band released three singles, Blue Mirror Boy (2006) which was produced by Crowded House bass player Nick Seymour, Pyramid Clocks (2007) and Weighted Love (2007). Blue Mirror Boy reached number 33 and Pyramid Clocks reached number 36 on the Official Irish Charts. Their album Exit Here, which was recorded in Windmill Lane Studios in Dublin and produced by Richard Rainey, was released in June 2007 on Eavesdrop Music. The band toured in Ireland, the UK and North America and shared a stage with the likes of Editors, The Wonderstuff, Sultans of Ping and Ocean Colour Scene. They were named as 'Best Band' at the prestigious 'Indie Week' festival in Toronto, the 'Best New Musical Artist' at the MAMCA awards and "ones to watch" by the NME. The band's songs appeared on various compilation albums in the US, Australia, Germany, Canada and Ireland. Four of their songs were licensed to the American TV Network CBS. The band broke up in 2009.

== Solo career ==
Forde went solo in 2009, writing, singing and playing his own material for the first time. His debut solo effort 'Pop Them Pills' finished in Third place in the "Folk/Singer-Songwriter" category in the 2009 International Songwriting Competition (ISC) in Nashville. The ISC received approximately 15,000 entries from almost 100 countries throughout the world. The judges included Tom Waits, Jeff Beck, Robert Smith (musician) (The Cure), Frank Black (The Pixies) and Kings of Leon. The song also received an honourable mention in the Billboard World Song Contest.

In 2010, Forde's song 'Love at the Airport' was selected from hundreds of entries to have a music video produced in conjunction with Hot Press & Tisch/New York University. Previous winners include: Sinéad O'Connor, The Frames, The Coronas, Republic of Loose and Laura Izibor. He released the song as his first single in December 2010.

== Radio Show ==
Forde also produced and presented his own radio show called 'The Lookout' on BCR 92.6 FM. The show focused on new up and coming talent from the Irish Music Scene while also looking at great Irish bands from the past.

== Discography ==
With Sutras

- Live (EP – 1999)
- An Audience with (EP – 2000)
- Princess (Single – 2001)
- The Lonely Ones (Single – 2002)
- Believe (Single – 2003)

With Vesta Varro

- Blue Mirror Boy (Single – 2006)
- Pyramid Clocks (Single – 2007)
- Weighted Love (Single – 2007)
- Exit Here (Album – 2007)

Solo

- Pop Them Pills (Promo – 2009)
- Love at the Airport (Single – 2010)

== TV appearances ==
- CTV – Much Music (Music Video)
- CBS – Guiding Light (Music)
- MTV2 – Alternative Nation (Music Video)
- RTÉ – Den TV (Interview + Live performance)
- RTÉ – Fish (Interview + Music Video)
- RTÉ – No Disco (Music Videos)
- RTÉ – O2 in the Park Festival (Live performance)
- TG4 – Pop TV (Live performances, Interviews + Music Videos)
- RTÉ – Top 30 Hits (Music Video)
- RTÉ – Joy in the Hood (Music)
- Channel 6 – Night Shift (Music Video)
- Musician's Channel – Sky Digital (Music Video)
- City Channel – City Channel (Music Video)
- Online – BalconyTV (Live performance)
