= Keith A. Taylor =

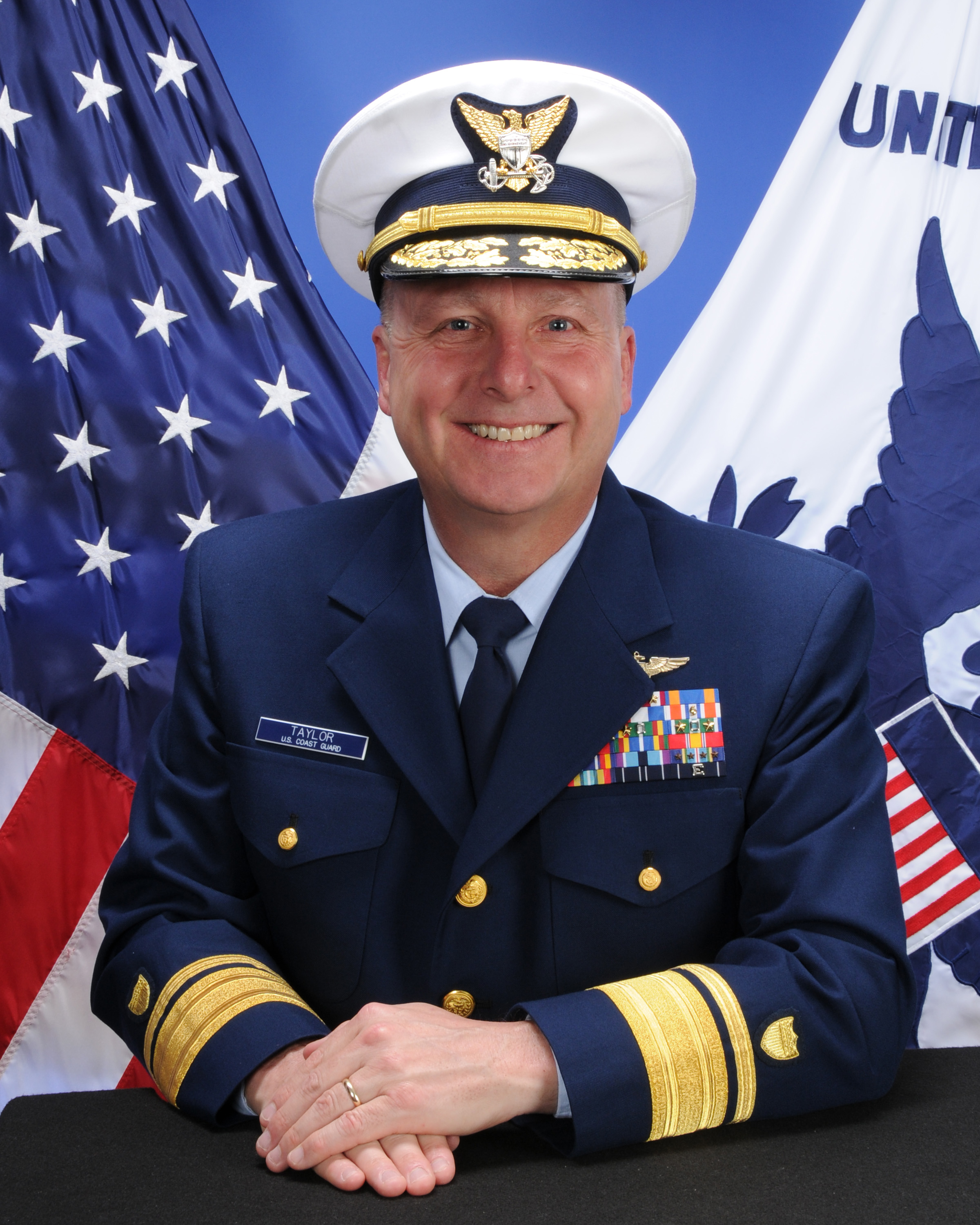
- Born: May 21, 1961 (age 65); Springfield, Massachusetts
- Military career
- Allegiance: United States
- Branch: United States Coast Guard
- Service years: 1983–2013
- Rank: Rear Admiral

Taylor (left) officiates at the retirement ceremony for Coast Guard Captain Michael Gardiner

Keith A. Taylor is an American retired United States Coast Guard Rear Admiral. He is the current Senior Vice President of Fleet Operations at Holland America Line Inc. and Seabourn Cruise Line Limited.

== Early life ==
Taylor was born on May 21, 1961, in Springfield, Massachusetts, and attended the U.S. Coast Guard Academy from 1979 to 1983. He holds a Bachelor of Science with honors, a Master of Science in Industrial Administration from Purdue University, and a Master of Business Administration from the Massachusetts Institute of Technology. While at MIT Taylor was a Sloan Fellow.

== Coast Guard Career ==
Taylor served over 30 years in the U.S. Coast Guard, in a variety of command, operational, engineering, and staff assignments. Taylor worked at Coast Guard headquarters in Washington, D.C., between 1996 and 2000, where he conducted program review and budget development for all Coast Guard law enforcement. In 2003, Taylor was an aviator and aircraft maintenance officer, and became commanding officer of Air Station Miami. From 2006 to 2008, Taylor served as deputy chief of staff of the Coast Guard, until he was promoted to flag officer rank in 2008. He then he served as assistant commandant for resources and chief financial officer of the U.S. Coast Guard. Taylor continued his career as commander of the 13th Coast Guard District.

Taylor eventually rose to the rank of Rear Admiral. He retired on August 29, 2013. His final post was as the Commander of Coast Guard District 13, based in Seattle, Washington, a position he held since July 2011. During his time as commander, the district was responsible for saving the lives of 401 people during 3,284 search and rescue cases; the district also responded to calls for help resulting in the assistance to 6,350 people, as well as responding to 6,000 oil spills or chemical releases. Finally, under his command the district saved $21.75 million in property values.

== Post-military career ==
Upon his retired from the military, Taylor was named senior vice president, fleet operations, for both Holland America Line and Seabourn. Beginning January 1, 2014, Taylor took over the fleet management responsibilities of Dan Grausz, executive vice president of fleet operations.

== Personal life ==
On November 12, 1988, Taylor married his wife, Charlene Brown, in Osterville, Massachusetts.
