= Keith Slatter =

English rugby league footballer

Playing information
- Position: Second-row
Club
Years	Team	Pld	T	G	FG	P
1960–66	Castleford	41	2	0	0	6
1968–69	Hunslet F.C.	24	3	0	0	9
	Total	65	5	0	0	15

Keith Slatter is an English former professional rugby league footballer who played in the 1960s. He played at club level for Castleford and Hunslet F.C.

== Playing career ==
=== County League appearances ===
Keith Slatter played in Castleford's victory in the Yorkshire League during the 1964–65 season.
