= Keith Vallejo =

Mormon bishop convicted of sexual assault

Keith Vallejo is a former Mormon bishop who was convicted of sexually abusing two women in Utah. He was sentenced to up to life in prison in 2017 by Judge Thomas Low, who caused controversy by calling Vallejo an “extraordinarily good man” who did something wrong. Vallejo appealed his conviction, claiming that his previous attorneys were ineffective and that the trial was unfair, but the Utah Supreme Court upheld his conviction in 2019. Vallejo maintained his innocence and said he was bullied into confessing by the justice system.
