= Scramble Campbell =

American live music painter

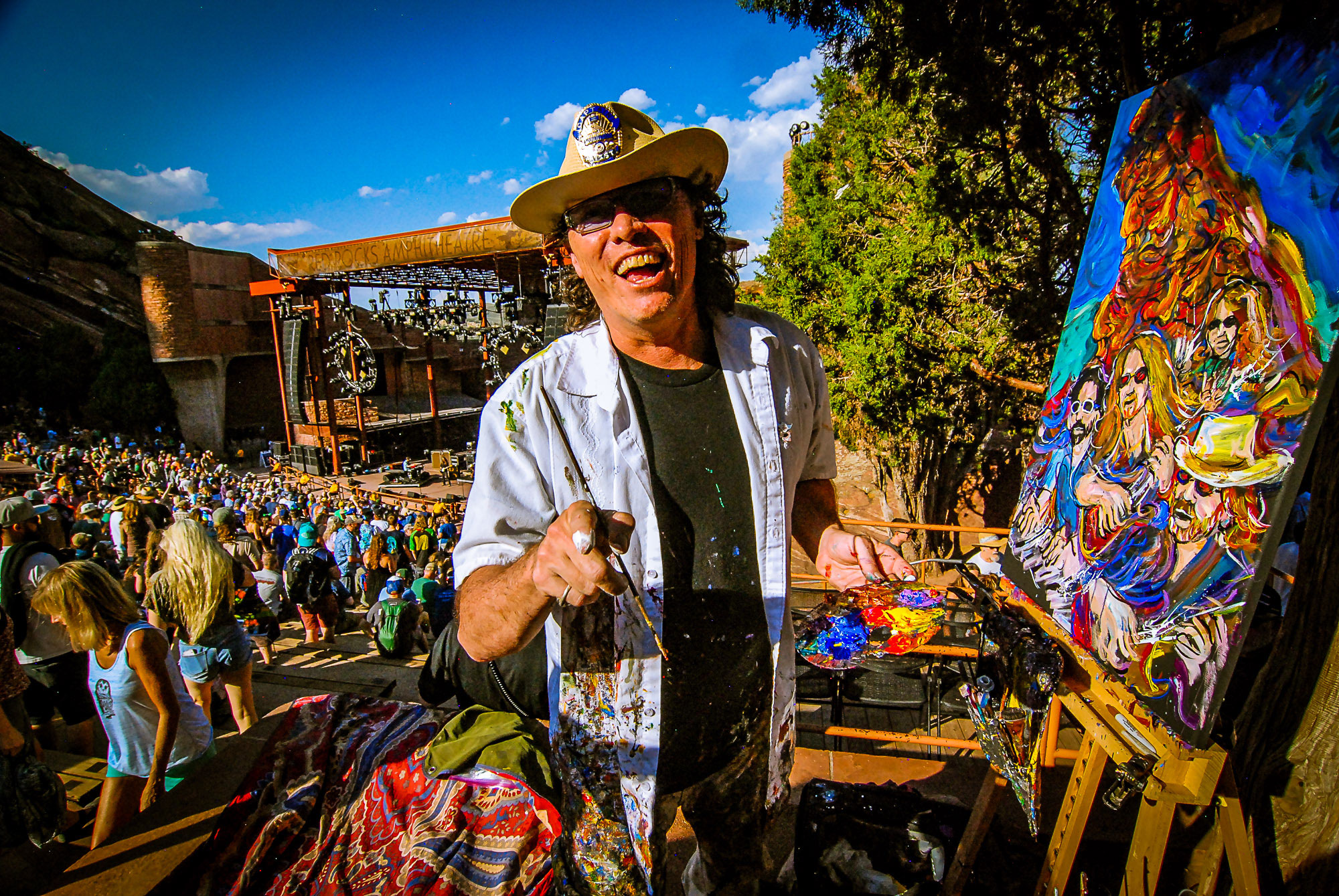
- Keith "Scramble" Campbell live-paints during a Grant Farm set at Red Rocks Amphitheatre in Morrison, Colorado.
- Born: Keith Campbell; 1964 (age 61–62); Manchester, New Hampshire, US
- Occupation: Painter
- Known for: Expressionist paintings
- Spouse: Shay Berry Campbell

Scramble Campbell (born Keith Campbell, 1964) is an American live music painter known for his brightly colored, expressionist paintings and screen prints of bands, musicians, and musical events. He is closely associated with Red Rocks Amphitheatre in Morrison, Colorado, where he has been described as the venue’s artist-in-residence for more than two decades, regularly live-painting concerts on site.

== Early life ==
Scramble Campbell was born Keith 'David' Campbell, 1964, in Manchester, New Hampshire. In 1971 at the age of seven, he moved to Casselberry, Florida. He went to Casselberry Elementary School and Lake Howell High School Maitland, Florida. He attended Tampa Technical Institute for Commercial Art, and graduated 1983 with an Associates of Science Degree.

== Florida years ==
After graduating he moved from Tampa to Altamonte Springs, Florida in 1985 and continued to pursue his artistic career. 1985 Campbell painted his first series of abstract works and signs them Scram 85. After a visit to the Salvador Dalí Museum, in St Petersburg, Florida, Campbell was immensely inspired and proceeded to draw, rapidly filling numerous sketchbooks. A new style of symbols and characters emerged in his studio art, and ScrambleVision was born. His vast vocabulary of symbols began to emerge in 1985–1986. Scramble says: "the fish is society swimming along, the eyeball is the fully focused individual, that's why he's got a big smile and one eye, he's more centered. The little nose character, he's in everybody, and his eyes are in his nose because his life-force is his breath." In the 1990s, Campbell's touring and painting career took off, painting with Djs and exhibiting nightclub installations at the Palace in Sanford, Florida.

== Career ==
Campbell was initially inspired to going out and painting live by LeRoy Neiman. He saw that one could make a living at art. However instead of live sports events, Campbell enjoyed the live-music experience. In 1988 he began his autographed art series of bands by drawing the Ramones, U2, INXS, the B-52's and taking his drawings to the concert to show the bands. Campbell's first one-man art show was a Spaces Gallery in Mount Dora, Florida.

In the 1990s, Campbell's touring and painting career took off, painting with Djs and exhibiting nightclub installations at the Palace in Sanford, Florida. In 1991 he became the Vice President of the Art After Dark program of the Orlando Museum of Art. He was also an invited guest of Perry Farrell to the first Lollapalooza Art Exhibit and installation in Orlando, Florida. This was the beginning of continuing years of special Lollapalooza exhibitions. In 1992 it was titled Scrambled Tuna. He also had many warehouse art installations at the famous raves in central FL. This was an influential year, his first Grateful Dead concert. This was the beginning of much touring. In 1993 he followed the Grateful Dead Spring Tour; twelve cities on the East coast in the Chickens painted Volkswagen called the Ooh Noo Bus.

In 1993 he had his first exposure to the jam-band scene, touring with Phish, Widespread Panic, Blues Traveler, Aquarium Rescue Unit, among many others. 1993 was also the initial year of performance painting with Refried Confusion at the Chicken Ranch in Orlando, Florida. The first being the Psychedelic Easter Egg Hunt.

=== 1994 to 2004 ===
1994 began a tremendous decade of touring and painting for Scramble Campbell. It was the 25th anniversary of Woodstock Music and Art Festival in Saugerties, New York, called Woodstock '94. Scramble had been commissioned to do an 18 ft x12 ft section of the Woodstock Wall surrounding concert grounds.

Also, he was commissioned by Absolut Vodka to create an 8 ft x 40 ft Absolut Love Greenpeace solar powered mural installation in the Eco Village, which was entered into the corporate Greenpeace Collection and was displayed at the home office in Washington, D.C. He then worked on the Absolut Love Absolut Scramble billboard of Art & Love slogan in Seattle. He was at the same time commissioned to perform in Seattle at the Jazz & Yacht Club, where he live performance-painted an 8-foot x 24-foot mural of the billboard. The following year he was commissioned by Absolut Vodka to design the poster for Philadelphia Ballet's program called Leaps & Bounds. He also did performance painting and body-painted dancer that performed in front of Scramble's large mural created during the event.

It was also at Woodstock '94 that he displayed the Ooh Noo Volkswagen Bus.

From 1994 to 2004 Campbell was dedicated to his touring and live art. Ever increasing the number of shows and paintings, each year adding to his widening circle of performance painting destination dates.

In 2003, Campbell was profiled in Gary Monroe’s book Extraordinary Interpretations: Florida’s Self-Taught Artists (University Press of Florida).

Campbell made tradition of Woodstock, H.O.R.D.E., New Orleans Jazz & Heritage Festival, Lilith Tour, and every year being the featured artist at Magfest. Painting his original stage backdrops, props and performance painting the bands.

In 1995 he met artist Shay Berry whom he married in, 2004. They moved to Colorado in 2004.

Campbell remained active in arts advocacy from Florida to Colorado. By the early 2000s, Campbell began live-painting regularly at Red Rocks; he has been described as the venue’s artist-in-residence for over twenty years, and has referred to himself as the venue’s artist-in-residence since 2000.

Campbell also paints during the annual Easter Sunrise service at Red Rocks; editorial photo coverage shows him working on site in 2018 and 2024.

In 2004, Campbell, after touring with the show titled Extraordinary Interpretations: Florida Self-Taught Art, which included over 60 artists from all over the state. Campbell tapped some of this crew of fellow artists: Carl Knickerbocker, Regina Smith, Tony Garan, and Morgan Steele to help open Scramble's Vision Gallery in Winter Park, Florida. The gallery rotated pieces from all five artists. He moved to Colorado shortly after opening the gallery. Campbell then took a break from touring to take classes at the 2004 Visionary Art Intensive at the Omega Institute in Rhinebeck, New York with Alex & Allison Grey.

Living in Morrison, Colorado near Red Rocks Scramble painted in his studio as well. He completed Impressions on the Sacred Stones. Studio painting that depicts the history of Red Rocks Amphitheatre completed at Red Rocks home/studio. Sacred Stones has been on display in the Red Rocks visitor center since 2009.

Campbell continued to travel and paint throughout the last decade. Yearly attending New Orleans Jazz & Heritage Festival, Magfest, New Year's Eve, NedFest, Telluride Blues and Brews Festival, and the Red Rocks Amphitheatre Easter Sunrise Service.

Living in Colorado afforded him opportunity to performance paint at many Colorado events. Campbell also made numerous journeys to Europe. The Netherlands, Spain, London, Mexico, Thailand, Cambodia and Italy are among the many countries he has visited.

Campbell became a Historian and tour guide for the Red Rocks Amphitheatre in 2009. In 2010 he was proclaimed Mayor for a Day at Red Rocks' Leftover Salmon performance. Campbell has completed over 2000 performance paintings over his career. In 2009 Campbell's art was included in the book PhanArt, the art of the fans of Phish. Campbell became involved with the Arvada Center for the Arts and Humanities, becoming their Artist in Residence in 2011. Also in 2011 Campbell was hired by BookCliff Vineyards to make their winebottles his next canvas. Campbell is also involved with the Colorado Symphony Orchestra, and the Colorado Youth Symphony Orchestra.

In 2013 Campbell collaborated with Wagner Custom Skis to use the skis as his canvas. The skis were raffled off at the 2013 Blues and Brews Festival in Telluride, Colorado and won by Jim Woolaway. Campbell was approached by documentary film maker Eric Abramson which resulted in an award-winning documentary called ScrambleVision Released in 2013. Since 2000, Campbell has live-painted hundreds of concerts at Red Rocks, becoming a fixture at the venue. He also paints during the annual Easter Sunrise service at Red Rocks; photojournalistic coverage shows him working on site in both 2018 and 2024.

==== Selected festival appearances since 2014 ====
- Telluride Blues & Brews Festival (2025): The festival’s artist page lists Campbell live-painting “throughout the festival near the main stage sound tower.”
- Telluride Blues & Brews Festival (2014): The festival announced Campbell’s return as a performance painter, with appearances in VIP and at the official art gallery.
- Big Blues Bender (Las Vegas) (2014): Festival archive confirms dates/venue for the inaugural edition; an official festival post documents Campbell on site.
- Big Blues Bender (Las Vegas) (2015): Lineup announcement lists “Scramble Campbell — Multiple Days.”
- Telluride Blues & Brews Festival (2015): The festival again listed Campbell among returning artists.
- Telluride Blues & Brews Festival (2017): The festival’s year-in-review lineup includes “Scramble Campbell.”
- Red Rocks concert coverage (examples): Independent reviews note Campbell live-painting during Big Head Todd and the Monsters at Red Rocks (June 11, 2022) and Tedeschi Trucks Band at Red Rocks (July 26, 2024).
