= Keith Syers =

Soil scientist in New Zealand

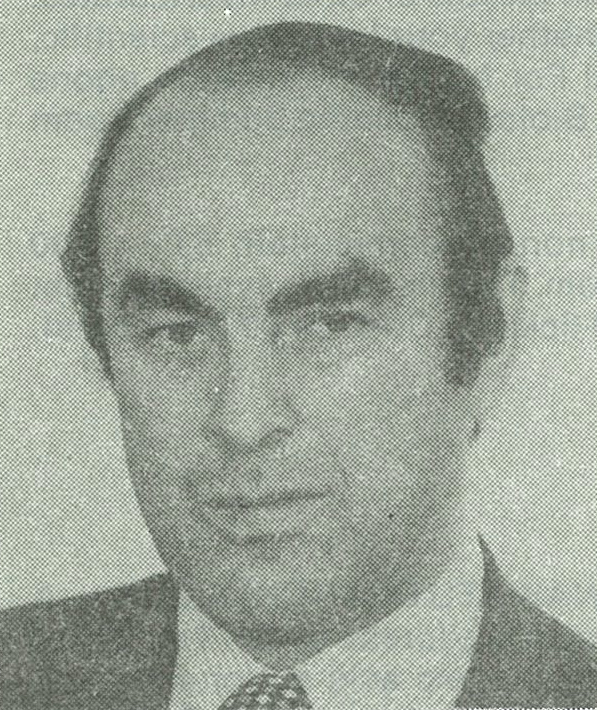
- Born: 1939
- Died: 16 July 2011 (aged 71–72); Thailand
- Education: Durham University
- Scientific career
- Workplaces: Massey University
- Thesis: A study of soil formation on carboniferous limestone, with particular reference to lichens as pedogenic agents. (1964)

John Keith Syers (1939 – 16 July 2011) was an Anglo-New Zealand academic and academic administrator.

== Academic career ==
After a PhD at Durham University Syers spend two years working with T.W. Walker at Lincoln University before moving to the University of Wisconsin–Madison. He moved to Massey University in 1972 to head the new Soil Science department. He primary interest was nutrient cycling in farmland. In 1985 Syers moved to Newcastle University.

== Selected works ==
- Efficiency of soil and fertilizer phosphorus use reconciling changing concepts of soil phosphorus behaviour with agronomic information
- The sustainable management of vertisols
- Nutrient management for sustainable crop production in Asia
