= Jean Twenge =

American psychologist (born 1971)

- Born: Jean Marie Twenge; August 24, 1971 (age 55)
- Education: University of Chicago (BA); University of Michigan (PhD)
- Known for: iGen
- Children: 3
- Scientific career
- Fields: Social psychology
- Workplaces: San Diego State University
- Thesis: Assertiveness, sociability, and anxiety: a cross-temporal meta-analysis, 1928–1993 (1998)
- Website: www.jeantwenge.com

Jean Marie Twenge (born August 24, 1971) is an American psychologist researching generational differences, including work values, life goals, and social attitudes. She is a professor of psychology at San Diego State University, author, consultant, and public speaker. In the September 2017 issue of The Atlantic, Twenge argued that smartphones were the most likely cause behind the sudden increases in mental health issues among teens after 2012. Twenge co-authored a 2017 corpus linguistics analysis that said that George Carlin's "seven dirty words you can't say on television" were used 28 times more frequently in 2008 than in 1950 in the texts at Google Books. Twenge said the increase is due to the dominance of self over social conventions.

== Publications ==
Twenge's publications include:

- Generation Me 2006; revised edition 2014, Atria, ISBN 9781476755564
- The Narcissism Epidemic: Living in the Age of Entitlement, with W. Keith Campbell, 2009, Simon & Schuster, ISBN 9781416576259
- Social Psychology, with David G. Myers, 10th edition (2010), co-author from 12th edition (2017), McGraw Hill, ISBN 9781266580468
- The Impatient Woman's Guide to Getting Pregnant 2012, Atria, ISBN 9781451620702
- Personality Psychology: Understanding Yourself and Others, with W. Keith Campbell, 2016; 2nd edition 2021, Pearson, ISBN 978-0205917426
- iGen: Why Today's Super-Connected Kids Are Growing Up Less Rebellious, More Tolerant, Less Happy and Completely Unprepared for Adulthood 2017, Atria, ISBN 9781501151989
- Generations: The Real Differences Between Gen Z, Millennials, Gen X, Boomers, and Silents — and What They Mean for America's Future 2023, Atria ISBN 9781982181611
- 10 Rules for Raising Kids in a High-Tech World 2025, Atria, ISBN 978-1668099995
