= W. Keith Campbell =

American social psychologist

- Born: William Keith Campbell
- Education: University of California at Berkeley, San Diego State University, University of North Carolina at Chapel Hill
- Known for: Work on narcissism
- Scientific career
- Fields: Social psychology
- Workplaces: University of Georgia
- Thesis: Narcissism and romantic attraction (1997)

William Keith Campbell is an American social psychologist known for his research on narcissism. He is a professor in the Department of Psychology in the University of Georgia's Franklin College of Arts and Sciences. He completed a BA at University of California, Berkeley, MA at University of California, San Diego, and PhD at University of North Carolina at Chapel Hill. He has published over 120 peer-reviewed papers and a number of books, including The Handbook of Narcissism and Narcissistic Personality Disorder: Theoretical Approaches, Empirical Findings, and Treatments (with Joshua Miller) and The Narcissism Epidemic: Living in the Age of Entitlement (with Jean Twenge).

== Books ==
- 2020: The New Science of Narcissism: Understanding One of the Greatest Psychological Challenges of Our Time—and What You Can Do About It (with Carolyn Crist)
- 2011: The Handbook of Narcissism and Narcissistic Personality Disorder By W. Keith Campbell, Joshua D. Miller
- 2010: The Narcissism Epidemic: Living in the Age of Entitlement By Jean M. Twenge, W. Keith Campbell
- 2005: When You Love a Man Who Loves Himself
