= Abundio Sagástegui Alva =

Peruvian plant taxonomist

- Born: October 23, 1932; Guzmango, Contumazá Province, Peru
- Died: May 26, 2012 (aged 79); Trujillo, Trujillo Province, Peru
- Resting place: Cementerio General de Miraflores, Trujillo; 8°06′04″S 79°01′28″W
- Education: Universidad Nacional de Trujillo
- Spouse: Yolanda Cruz de Sagastegui
- Children: 9
- Awards: Medalla de Honor del Congreso, member of the Academia Nacional de Ciencias
- Scientific career
- Fields: Asteraceae systematics, flora of Peru
- Workplaces: Universidad Nacional de Trujillo, Antenor Orrego Private University
- Thesis: (1976)
- Author abbrev. (botany): Sagást.

Abundio Sagástegui Alva (October 23, 1932 – May 26, 2012) was a Peruvian plant taxonomist and specialist of Asteraceae and the flora of Peru, particularly that of Northern Peru.

== Biography ==
Sagástegui was born to a modest family in Guzmango, Contumazá Province, in 1932. His father was Godofrego Sagástegui Chávez and his mother Otilia Alva. He went to the local school, where he finished first in his class. Thanks to this he was granted a scholarship and continued his studies at the Colegio Nacional San Ramón, in Cajamarca where again he excelled in his studies. This dedication allowed him to continue his studies at the Universidad Nacional de Trujillo (UNT), where he would eventually achieve the degree of doctor of biological science in 1976. He is also remembered for his mentorship skills, his ebullient personality and the remarkable enthusiasm he displayed for his work.

In 1956, after spending two years as a secondary education teacher in Otuzco, he entered the staff of the UNT where he would over the years teach botany and phytogeography—eventually achieving the title of "principal exclusive professor" (profesor principal dedicación exclusiva)—as well as becoming the first official curator of the university's herbarium. He then directed the botanical museum until his departure in 1988. He moved on to Antenor Orrego Private University, where he worked for 17 years, during which he also rose to the rank of principal exclusive professor as well as founding and directing the museum of natural history, the university herbarium and the journal Arnaldoa. In 2006 he went back to his alma mater UNT, where he would work until his death at the herbarium.

On the morning of May 26, 2012, he was grievously injured when he was hit by an unlicensed taxi driver in Trujillo. Following radiographies, he was transferred from Docente Regional Hospital to Víctor Lazarte Echegaray National Hospital, where he underwent overnight surgery, but never awoke from the operation and died at 4:00 pm the next day. He was survived by at least one brother, Vigilio, his wife Rita de Sagástegui and nine children. Although he had hoped some of them, who mostly became scientists, would take up botany, the closest he got to this was an agronomist. His funeral services were held at the UNT with speeches by several current and former officials of the university.

== Scientific career ==
"Como quisiera que el sol se estacionara para seguir trabajando"
How I wish the sun would stay in place so I could keep on working.

— Paraphrasing his teacher Nicolás Angulo Espino

Alongside his teachers Nicolás Angulo Espino and Arnaldo López Miranda, which he greatly admired (he named after the later a genus and the journal he founded) and constantly referred to both in daily life and teachings, he is thought of as a pioneer of botany in Northern Peru. He considered fieldwork to be a major component of botanical research, and all his manuals, such as Fitogeografía General y del Perú ("General and Peruvian Phytogeography", six editions), were based on extensive fieldwork. All that fieldwork amounted to some 18 000 specimens distributed in Peruvian and American herbaria (mostly the Herbarium Antenor Orrego and the Herbarium Truxillense). He worked in multiple areas of botany, not only systematics, but also phytogeography, floristics and plant morphology.

Until his postdoctoral work in La Plata, Argentina under Ángel Lulio Cabrera in the late 60s, Sagástegui had been interested primarily in Cyperaceae, with some forays into pteridology. By the time he obtained his doctorate, however, he had cemented a reputation as a specialist in the Asteraceae with over a dozen species to his name, mostly in Coreopsis and Verbesina. He would over the course of his career describe four new genera (Caxamarca, Jalcophila, Parachionolaena and Pseudoligandra) and nearly a hundred species in total, almost all of them composites, with 30 more named after him. He was especially interested in understanding the phytodiversity and floristics of Peru in general, and Northern Peru in particular, and his scientific production comprises approximately a hundred publications alone or in collaboration. Working with his former students, he supported the creation of herbaria in several of the country's university, such as the University of Piura in 2007.

Sagastegui was a two-time president of the Colegio de Biólogos del Perú, a member of the American Society of Plant Taxonomists, the Botanical Society of America and the executive board of the Organization for Flora Neotropica. Amongst other honors, he has been awarded the Palmas Magiosteriales of the Peruvian Ministry of Education (its highest award), the medal of honor of the National Congress of Peru and became a member of the Academia Nacional de Ciencias in 2007. After his death, the Congress' Committee on science, technology and technological innovation moved to award a posthumous distinction to his wife in his name.
