= Gerardo Chávez =

Peruvian artist (1937–2025)

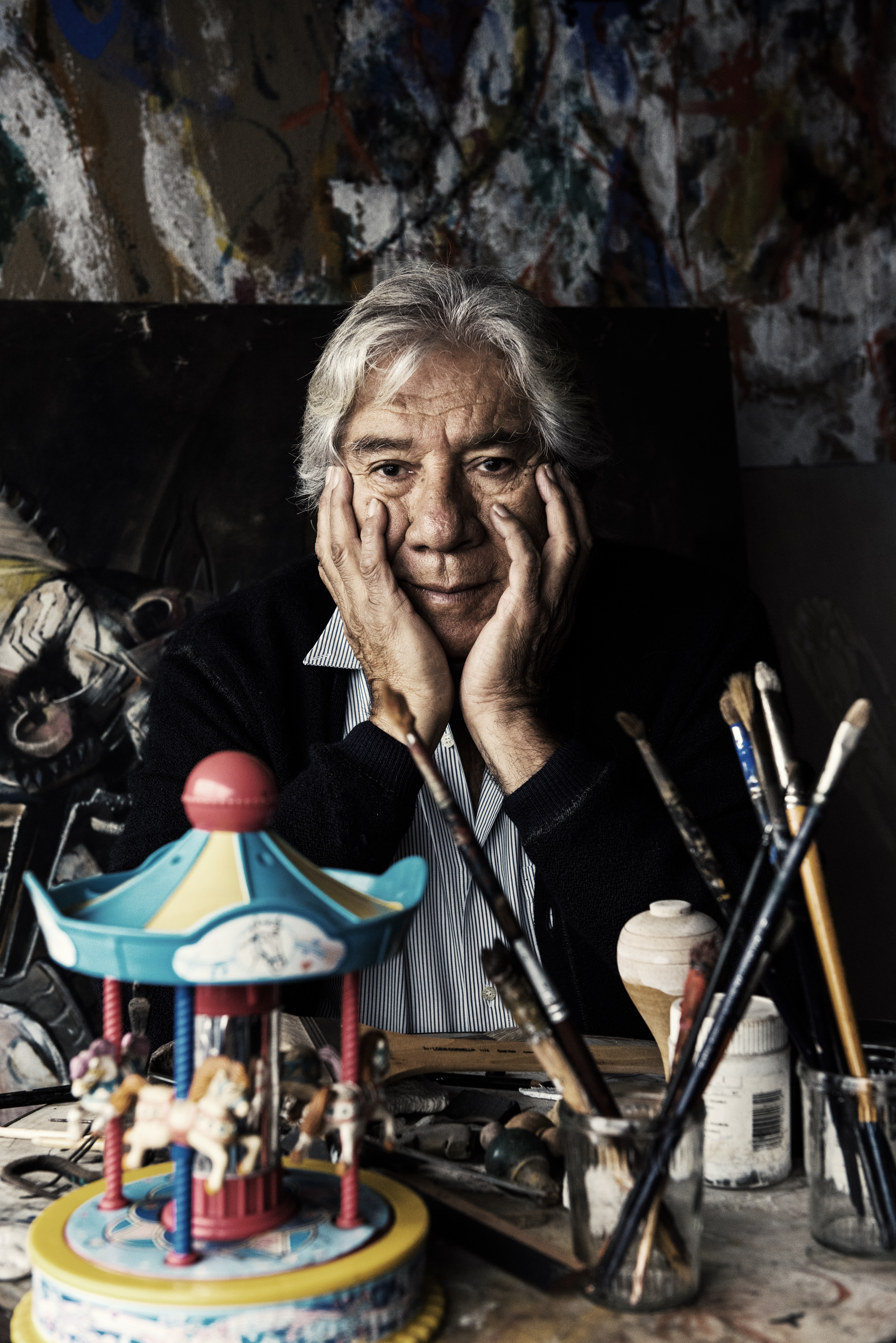
- Born: Gerardo Chávez López; 16 November 1937; Trujillo, Peru
- Died: 22 June 2025 (aged 87); Trujillo, Peru
- Occupations: Artist, painter
- Awards: Grand Officer of the Order of the Sun of Peru (2006)

Gerardo Chávez López (16 November 1937 – 22 June 2025) was a Peruvian artist from Trujillo whose artistic foundation has helped to develop a cultural environment in the city through the Toy Museum that was opened in 2001 and with the Museum of Modern Art which he founded, as well as Cultural Space "Angelmira" in honor of his brother. Chávez was one of the direct successors of the North Group born in the Trujillo city in the first half of the 20th century. In 2012, he was recognized as the most important Peruvian plastic artist in activity. He had been appointed chairman of the board for the Art and Culture of Trujillo. Chávez died on 22 June 2025, at the age of 87.

== Work and expositions ==
- National University of Trujillo Gallery, Peru.
- Lo Sprone Gallery, Florence, Italy.
- Sistine Gallery, Rome, Italy.
- Jacques Desbrieres Gallery, Paris, France.
- D'eendt Gallery, Amsterdam, the Netherlands.

== See also ==
- North Group
