= James Wagner =

James Wagner may refer to:

- James Elvin Wagner (1873–1969), American clergyman
- James Wagner (poet) (born 1969), American poet
- James W. Wagner (born 1953), president of Emory University, Atlanta, Georgia
