= Caxamarca =

Scientific classification
- Kingdom: Plantae
- Clade: Tracheophytes
- Clade: Angiosperms
- Clade: Eudicots
- Clade: Asterids
- Order: Asterales
- Family: Asteraceae
- Subfamily: Asteroideae
- Tribe: Senecioneae
- Genus: Caxamarca; M.O.Dillon & Sagást., 1999

Type species
- Caxamarca sanchezii M.O.Dillon & Sagást., 1999

Genus of flowering plants

Caxamarca is a genus of flowering plants in the daisy family, Asteraceae. It includes two species endemic to Peru.

== Species ==
- Caxamarca ayabacensis S.Leiva, Zapata & M.O.Dillon
- Caxamarca sanchezii M.O.Dillon & Sagást. – Peru
