= Jalcophila =

Scientific classification
- Kingdom: Plantae
- Clade: Embryophytes
- Clade: Tracheophytes
- Clade: Spermatophytes
- Clade: Angiosperms
- Clade: Eudicots
- Clade: Asterids
- Order: Asterales
- Family: Asteraceae
- Subfamily: Asteroideae
- Tribe: Gnaphalieae
- Genus: Jalcophila; M.O.Dillon & Sagást.

Genus of flowering plants

Jalcophila is a genus of flowering plants in the family Asteraceae.

Species

- Jalcophila boliviensis Anderb. & S.E.Freire – Bolivia
- Jalcophila colombiana S.Díaz & Vélez-Nauer – Nariño region in Colombia
- Jalcophila ecuadorensis M.O.Dillon & Sagást. – Nariño region in Colombia, Carchi + Napo Provinces in Ecuador
- Jalcophila peruviana M.O.Dillon & Sagást. – Department of La Libertad in Peru
