= Ramón Kobashigawa =

Peruvian Fujimorist politician (1939–2019)

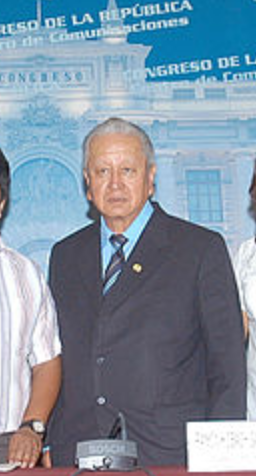
- Ramón Kobashigawa

Member of Congress
- In office 26 July 2011 – 26 July 2016
- Constituency: La Libertad

Personal details
- Born: Ramón Kobashigawa Kobashigawa; 24 August 1939 Trujillo, Peru
- Died: 12 July 2019 (aged 79) Trujillo, Peru
- Party: Popular Force
- Other political affiliations: Alliance for Progress; Vamos Vecino
- Education: National University of Trujillo
- Occupation: Politician

Ramón Kobashigawa Kobashigawa (24 August 1939 – 12 July 2019) was a Peruvian Fujimorist politician and a former Congressman, representing the La Libertad Region between 2011 and 2016 under the Popular Force party.

== Early life and education ==
He carried out his primary studies at the Miguel Grau School and secondary school at the Seminary School San Carlos and San Marcelo and at the San Juan de Trujillo National School. He then studied at the Faculty of Economic Sciences of the National University of Trujillo obtaining the title of Public Accountant.

== Political career ==
=== Congressman ===
In the 2011 elections, he ran for a seat in Congress under the Force 2011 party of Keiko Fujimori, representing La Libertad and was elected for the 2011–2016 term.

== Death ==
He died on 12 July 2020 at the age of 79, a few weeks before he turned 80.
