= Mexerion =

Scientific classification
- Kingdom: Plantae
- Clade: Tracheophytes
- Clade: Angiosperms
- Clade: Eudicots
- Clade: Asterids
- Order: Asterales
- Family: Asteraceae
- Tribe: Gnaphalieae
- Genus: Mexerion; G.L.Nesom

Species
- See text.

Genus of flowering plants

Mexerion is a genus of flowering plants in the tribe Gnaphalieae within the family Asteraceae. As of May 2024, the number of species accepted varies from one to three.

== Taxonomy ==
The genus was erected by Guy L. Nesom in 1990, with two species, M. mexicanum and the type species M. sarmentosum. In 2023, Nesom added a third species, M. stolonatum, transferred from Chionolaena. As of May 2024, Plants of the World Online accepted only M. mexicanum and M. stolonatum, while the World Flora Online accepted only M. mexicanum.

=== Species ===
As of May 2024, Tropicos listed three species:

- Mexerion mexicanum G.L.Nesom
- Mexerion sarmentosum (Klatt) G.L.Nesom
- Mexerion stolonatum (S.F.Blake) G.L.Nesom
