= Carlos Garrido =

Carlos Garrido may refer to:

- Carlos Sampaio Garrido (1883–1960), Portuguese diplomat
- Carlos Hugo Garrido Chalén (born 1951), Peruvian poet
- Carlos Garrido (footballer, born 1977), Chilean football defender
- Carlos Garrido (footballer, born 1994), Spanish football defender

== See also ==
- Juan Carlos Garrido (born 1969), Spanish football manager
