= Yunque =

Yunque may refer to:

== People ==
- Carlos Irizarry Yunqué, Associate Justice of the Supreme Court of Puerto Rico
- Edgardo Vega Yunqué (1936–2008), Puerto Rican novelist and short-story writer

== Places ==
- El Yunque National Forest, a forest located in northeastern Puerto Rico
- El Yunque (organization), a former secret society of Mexican origin
- El Yunque (Cuba), a table-top shaped mountain in Cuba
- El Yunque (Puerto Rico), a mountain in Puerto Rico
- Paco Yunque, a children's story originally written in Spanish by Peruvian poet César Vallejo

== Other uses ==
- El Yunque least gecko, is a species of lizard in the family Sphaerodactylidae
