= Los heraldos negros =

1919 poetry anthology by César Vallejo

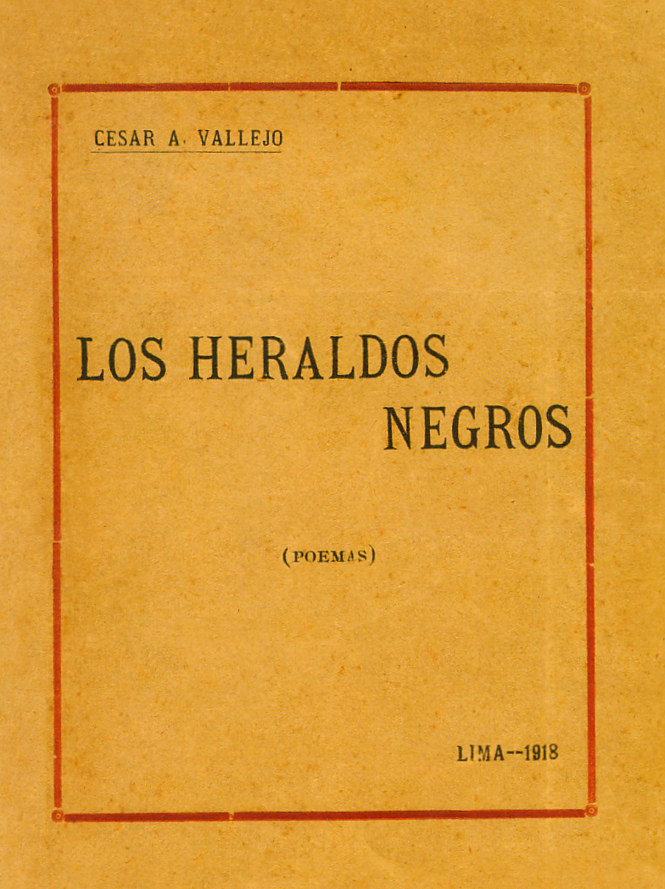
- First edition
- Author: César Vallejo
- Language: Spanish
- Publication date: 1919

Los heraldos negros is the title of a collection of poems written by the Peruvian poet César Vallejo between the years 1915 and 1918 and published in July 1919. It was the first book of Vallejo's to be published. Los heraldos negros is also the name of the first poem in the collection.

== Literary context ==
At the beginning of the 20th century Latin American literature found itself under the influence of modernist poetry, the most salient examples of which were Rubén Darío, José Santos Chocano, Leopoldo Lugones, among others, all of whom were known and read by Vallejo. In the years of the creation of Los heraldos negros (1915-1918), Vallejo was taking part in the literary group in Trujillo known as "La bohemia trujillana" (later known as the Grupo Norte) and became friends with José Eulogio Garrido y Antenor Orrego, both of whom were knowledgeable about the literary developments of their day. It was thanks to these relationships that Vallejo became acquainted with the poetry of Julio Herrera y Reissig, the Uruguayan modernist whose writings also influenced Vallejo.

At the end of 1917 Vallejo moved to Lima where he met writers and intellectuals such as Abraham Valdelomar and his Colónida literary group.

== Publication ==
Los heraldos negros was published by the printing presses of the Lima Penitentiary. The work was originally meant to be published in 1918, but it was delayed on account of Vallejo waiting in vain for his friend Abraham Valdelomar to write the introduction. Los heraldos negros finally appeared in 1919 in a short print run.
