= National University of Trujillo =

Public university in Trujillo, Peru

- Universidad Nacional de Trujillo
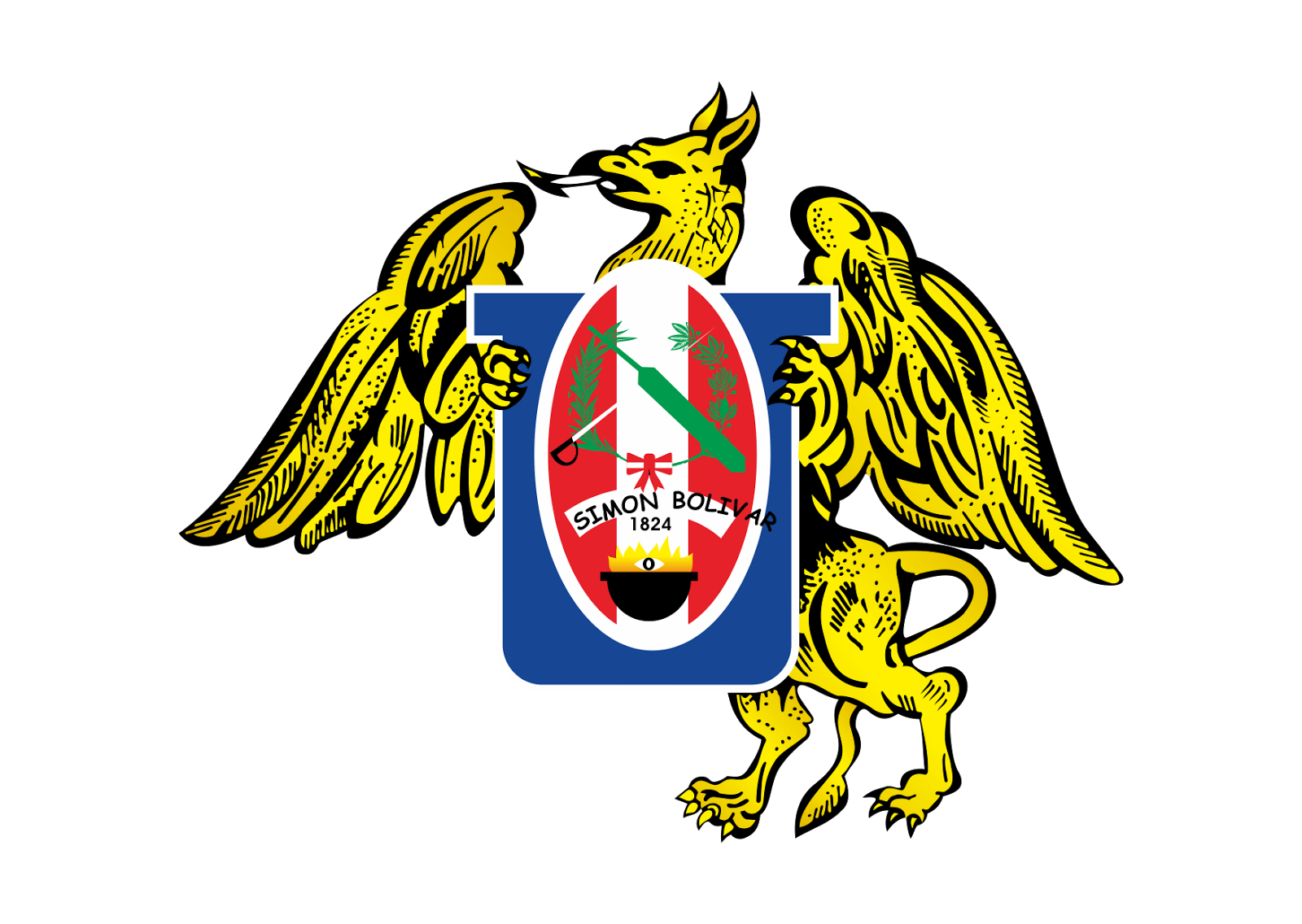
- Motto: República, Ley y Libertad; Scientia Liberet
- Motto in English: Republic, Law and Freedom; Knowledge Frees You
- Type: Public University
- Established: May 10, 1824; 202 years ago
- Founders: Simón Bolívar; José Faustino Sánchez Carrión
- Rector: Carlos Vásquez Boyer
- Faculty: 12
- Administrative staff: 3,000
- Students: 16,453 (2014)
- Location: Diego de Almagro 344, Trujillo, La Libertad, Peru; 8°6′53″S 79°2′19″W
- Campus: Urban 35 acres (14 ha)
- Colors: Blue
- Mascot: Griffin
- Website: www.unitru.edu.pe

The National University of Trujillo (Spanish: Universidad Nacional de Trujillo) (UNT) is a major public university located in Trujillo, Peru, capital of the department of La Libertad. The university was founded by Simón Bolívar and José Faustino Sánchez Carrión, who met in Huamachuco; they signed the decree of foundation on May 10, 1824, before Peru's independence from Spain. National University of Trujillo, was the first republican university founded in Peru.

UNT has approximately 16,000 students in 13 academic faculties, making it one of the largest universities in the country. The current rector is Dr. Carlos Vásquez Boyer.

The UNT is ranked as one of the best universities in Peru.

== History ==
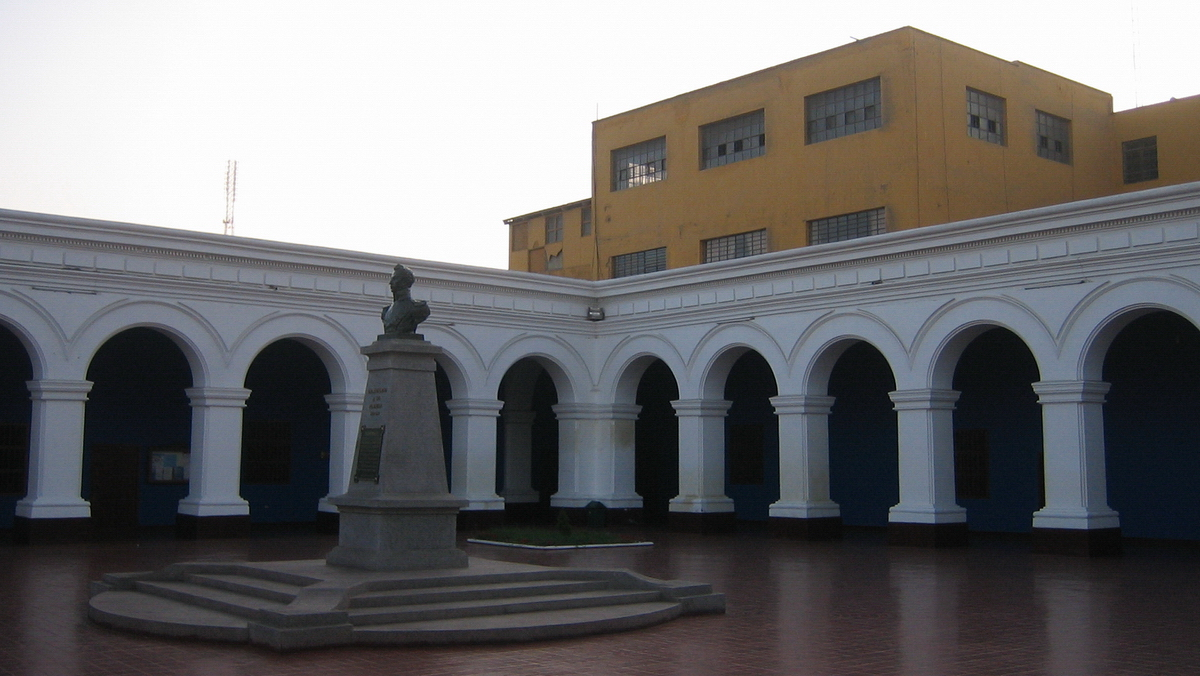
Old campus of the National University of Trujillo in the center of the city

The National University of Trujillo is a Peruvian university located in the city of Trujillo, La Libertad Region in northern Peru whose acronym is UNT. It was founded during the Republican era by General Simón Bolívar, who issued from his headquarters in Huamachuco a decree founding the university on May 10, 1824, having as a secretary Don José Faustino Sánchez Carrión. The first director was Don Carlos Pedemonte y Talavera and whose term begins on October 22, 1831. On 23 November 1831 the Government appointed as supreme patron of the University to St. Thomas and St. Rose of Lima, where it ran. The first colleges environments were inside the school founded by bishops El Salvador. The first classes were Dogmatic and Moral Theology, Canons and Laws, Anatomy and Medicine, Philosophy and Mathematics. The first academic degrees awarded by UNT were those of Bachelor, Master and Doctor of Laws and Sacred Canons. It adopts the College system starting in 1861. From Its classrooms exited the universal poet César Vallejo in 1916, the first political philosopher Antenor Orregoin 1928, Víctor Raúl Haya de la Torre, Eduardo González Viaña, Carlos Hugo Garrido Chalén, among others.

== Schools ==
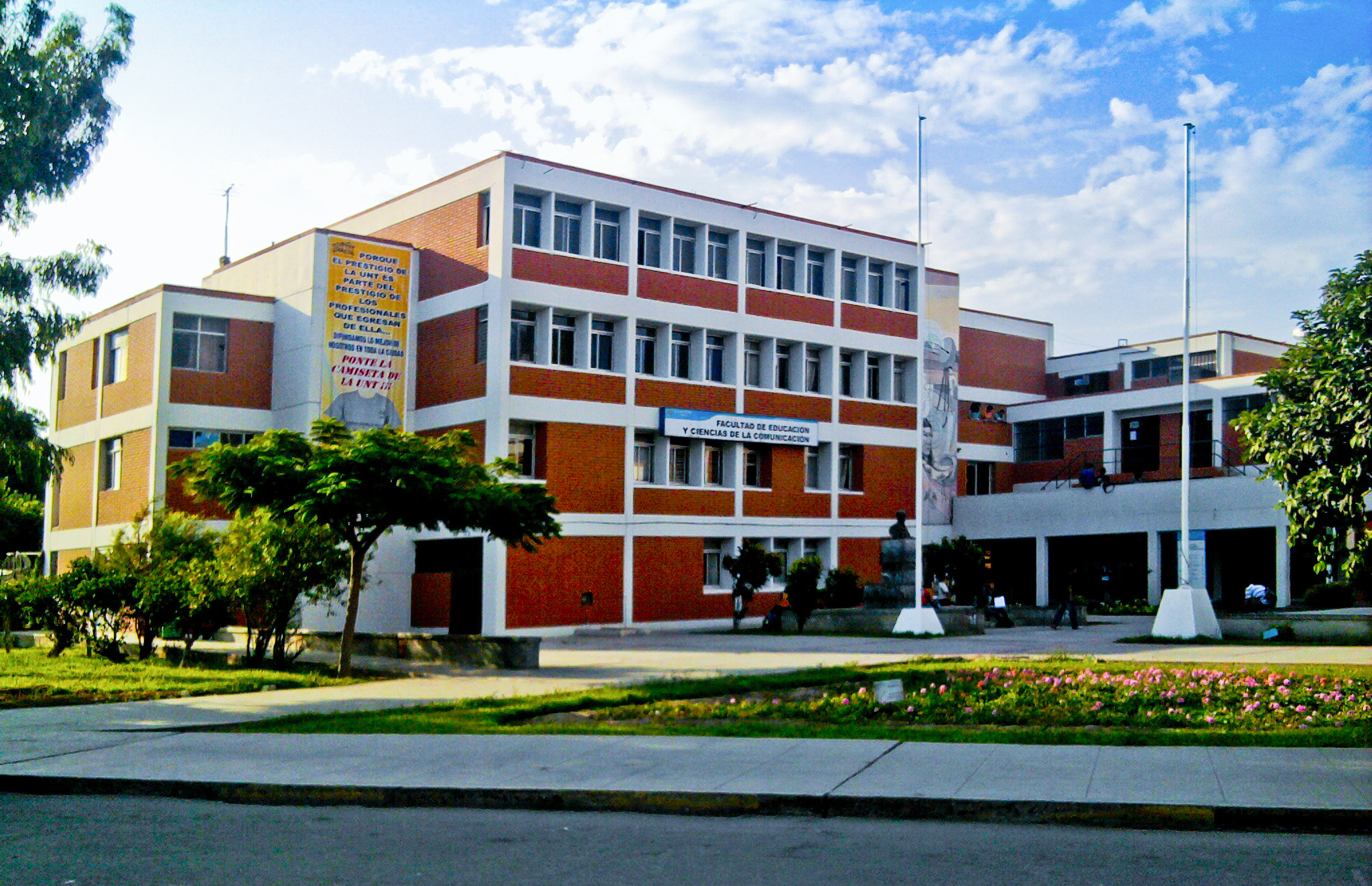
National University of Trujillo

UNT is organized into 13 faculty which contain 40 professional Schools.

Faculty	Professional School
Faculty of Biological Sciences	Biological Sciences
Faculty of Biological Sciences	Microbiology and Parasitology
Faculty of Biological Sciences	Fisheries biology
Faculty of Pharmacy and Biochemistry	Pharmacy and Biochemistry
Faculty of Education and Communication Sciences	Communication Sciences
Faculty of Education and Communication Sciences	Initial Education
Faculty of Education and Communication Sciences	Primary Education
Faculty of Education and Communication Sciences	Secondary Education
Faculty of Medicine	Human Medicine
Faculty of Dentistry	Dentistry
Faculty of Social Sciences	Social Work
Faculty of Social Sciences	Tourism
Faculty of Social Sciences	Anthropology
Faculty of Social Sciences	Archaeology
Faculty of Social Sciences	Geography
Faculty of Social Sciences	History
Faculty of Physical and Mathematical Sciences	Physics
Faculty of Physical and Mathematical Sciences	Computer Science
Faculty of Physical and Mathematical Sciences	Statistics Engineering
Faculty of Physical and Mathematical Sciences	Mathematics
Faculty of Economical Sciences	Administration
Faculty of Economical Sciences	Economics
Faculty of Economical Sciences	Accountancy
Faculty of Law and Political Sciences	Law
Faculty of Law and Political Sciences	Political Sciences and Governability
Faculty of Engineering	Industrial Engineering
Faculty of Engineering	Mechanical Engineering
Faculty of Engineering	Civil Engineering
Faculty of Engineering	Architecture and Urbanism
Faculty of Engineering	Metallurgic Engineering
Faculty of Engineering	Systems Engineering
Faculty of Engineering	Mines Engineering
Faculty of Engineering	Materials Engineering
Faculty of Engineering	Mechatronics Engineering
Faculty of Chemical Engineering	Chemical Engineering
Faculty of Chemical Engineering	Environmental Engineering
Faculty of Nursing	Nursing
Faculty of Agropecuary Sciences	Agroindustrial Engineering
Faculty of Agropecuary Sciences	Agricultural Engineering
Faculty of Agropecuary Sciences	Zootechnics

== Notable alumni ==
Among former renowned professors and students are:

- César Vallejo, poet and journalist. Thomas Merton called him "the greatest universal poet since Dante". The late British poet, critic and biographer Martin Seymour-Smith, a leading authority on world literature, called Vallejo "the greatest twentieth-century poet in any language." He also was leader of the cultural group in Trujillo city called Grupo Norte (North Group).
- Abundio Sagástegui Alva, biologist. He has proposed about four new genus and 88 new species, based on Peruvian botanical diversity.
- Víctor Raúl Haya de la Torre, political leader who founded the American Popular Revolutionary Alliance (APRA) political movement. He is recognized as the most influential Peruvian political leader of the twentieth century and one of the most important Latin American political ideologues.
- María Julia Mantilla García, Miss World 2004.
- Carlos Hugo Garrido Chalén, writer and poet.
- Eduardo González Viaña, writer and journalist.
- Antenor Orrego, political philosopher.
- Ciro Alegría, novelist, writer and journalist.
- Allan Wagner Tizón, diplomat.

== See also ==
- North Group
