= Georgette Vallejo =

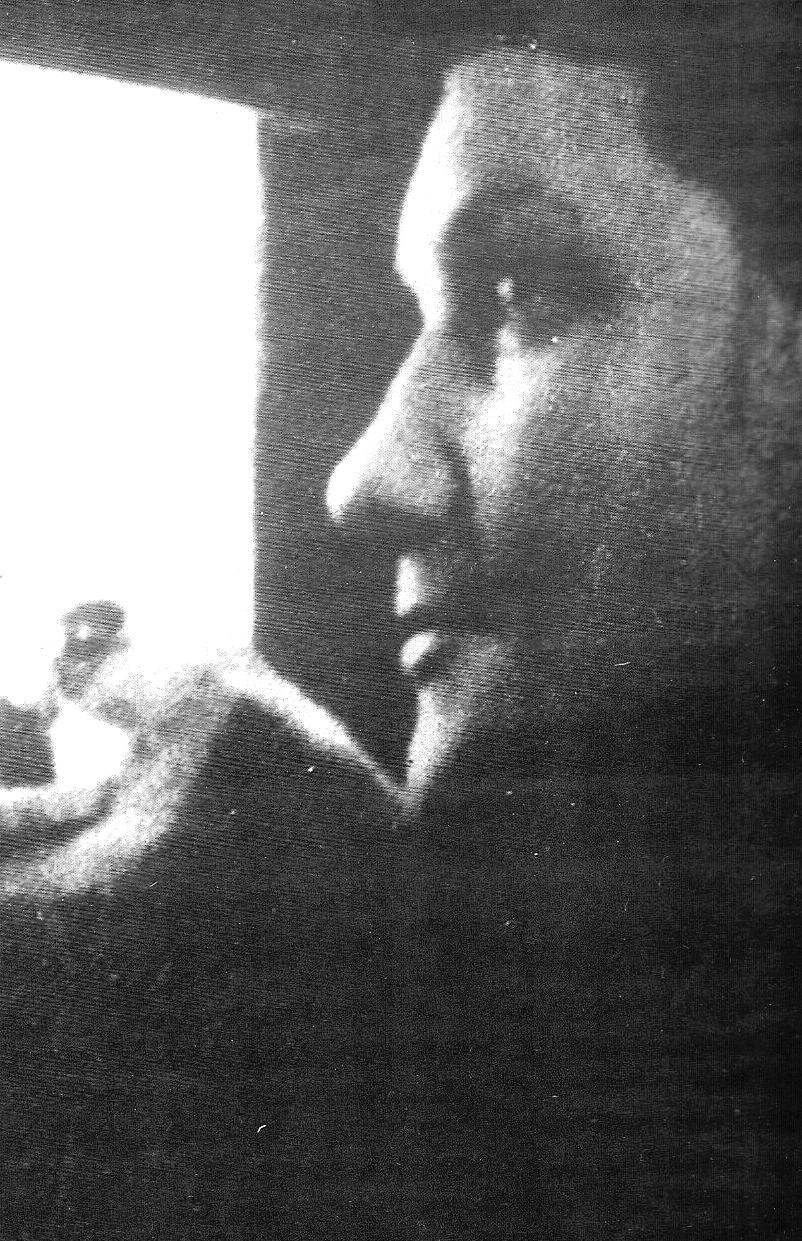
- Born: Georgette Marie Philippart Travers; January 7, 1908; 14th arrondissement, Paris, France
- Died: December 4, 1984 (aged 76); Lima, Peru
- Occupation: Writer, poet
- Spouse: César Vallejo (1934-1938)

Georgette Marie Philippart Travers (Paris, 7 January 1908 – Lima, 1984), French writer and poet. She was the wife of the Peruvian poet César Vallejo of international fame, considered by Mario Benedetti to be a "human paradigm", while the American poet-monk Thomas Merton points out that "the project for the translation of his poetry is of an urgent and enormous importance for the entire human race."

== Biography ==
Georgette Marie Philippart Travers, was born in Paris on 7 January 1908. Her parents were Alexandre Jean Baptiste Philippart and Marie Travers. When Georgette was six years old, her father died fighting off the German Army in the Battle of the Marne World War I on 7 September 1914. Before his passing, he sent a letter home, where he recognized Georgette Marie as his daughter.

Because of the war, she was sent to Brittany where she completed her elementary education in Vitré. She continued her secondary education in the Sevigné School in Vitré, and graduated in 1922. Upon the completion of her studies, she moved to París to work in a seamstress shop with her mother.

In 1925, she began one of the most interesting moments of her life: A fortune-teller read her destiny and announced that a "Prince Charming would come from afar. He has crossed the seas. He is ugly, but is a luminary being. You will always be the first person on his mind.". The famous and long-awaited "Prince Charming" was no one less than a man, who with the passage of time would become a leader in world literature: César Abraham Vallejo Mendoza. The 31-year-old poet had come to Paris on 13 July 1923, and was writing in the "Grands journaux Ibero-Americaines," living on Molière Street, where he would first see Georgette from a window in the front of his room. Although she was only 17, she made a huge impression on him.

In 1927 when Cesar Vallejo eventually talked to her he was much older and lived in her neighborhood. This was also the year of his first trip to Russia. The two eventually became lovers, much to the dismay of her mother. Georgette traveled with Vallejo to Spain the end of December 1930 and returned in January 1932, when she became very ill and required an operation. Back in Paris Vallejo married Georgette Philippart in 1934. She remained a controversial figure concerning the publication of Vallejo's works for many years after his death.
