= César Vallejo =

Peruvian writer & poet (1892–1938)

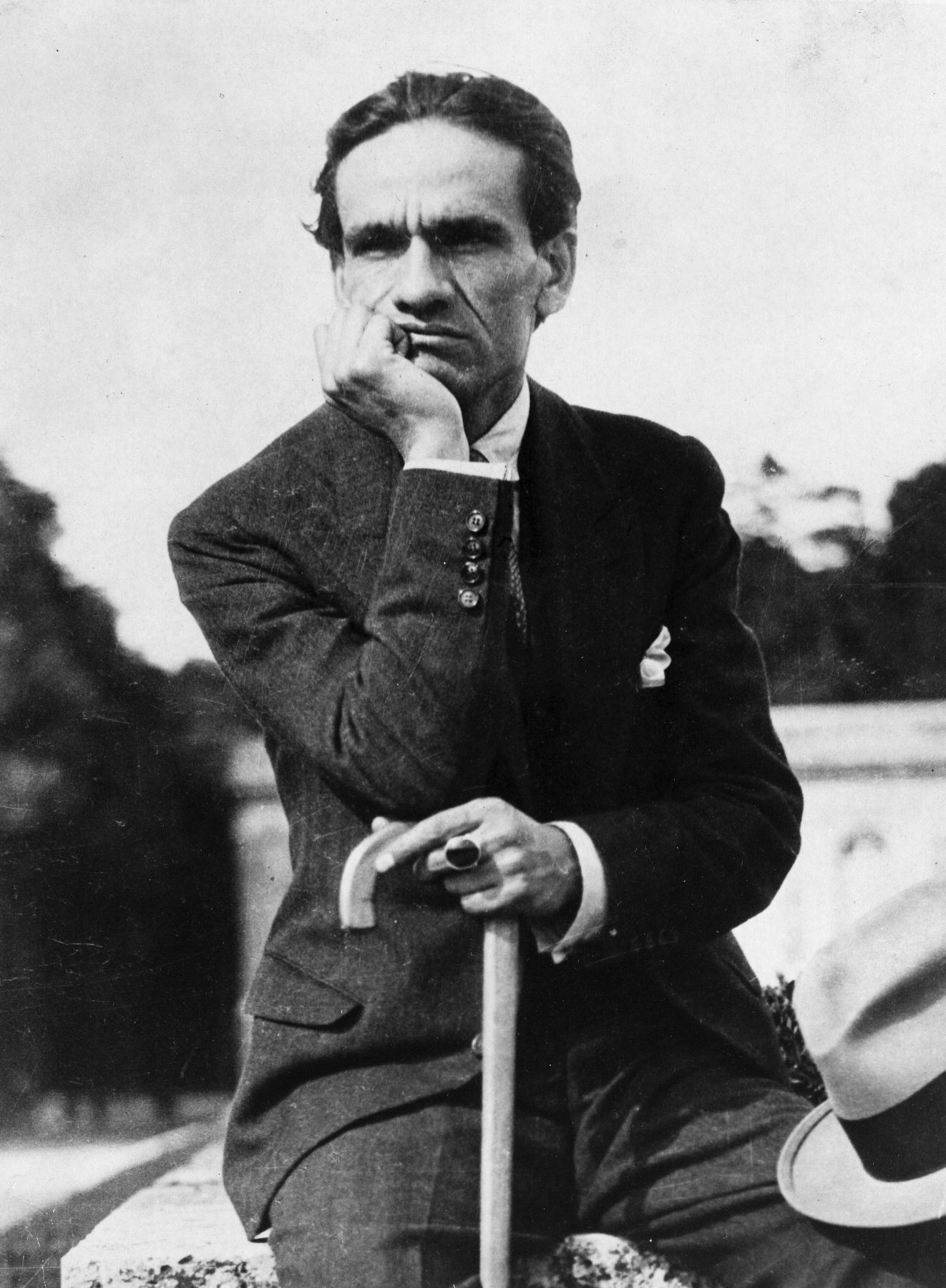
- Vallejo in 1929
- Born: César Abraham Vallejo Mendoza; March 16, 1892; Santiago de Chuco, La Libertad, Peru
- Died: April 15, 1938 (aged 46); Paris, France
- Resting place: Montparnasse Cemetery, Paris, France
- Education: National University of San Marcos
- Occupations: Poet, writer, journalist
- Spouse: Georgette Vallejo (m. 1934)
- Writing career
- Genres: Poetry; novel; short story; drama
- Notable works: Los heraldos negros; Trilce; Spain, take this cup from me
- Movement: Vanguards

César Abraham Vallejo Mendoza (Spanish: [ˈsesaɾ βaˈʝexo]; (Note: In isolation, Vallejo is pronounced [baˈʝexo] in Spanish.) March 16, 1892 – April 15, 1938) was a Peruvian poet, writer, playwright, and journalist. Although he published only two books of poetry during his lifetime, he is considered one of the great poetic innovators of the 20th century in any language. Thomas Merton called him "the greatest universal poet since Dante". The late British poet, critic and biographer Martin Seymour-Smith, a leading authority on world literature, called Vallejo "the greatest twentieth-century poet in any language." He was a member of the intellectual community called North Group formed in the Peruvian north coastal city of Trujillo.

Clayton Eshleman and José Rubia Barcia's translation of The Complete Posthumous Poetry of César Vallejo won the National Book Award for translation in 1979.

Some of his poems have been set to music by the Indonesian composer and pianist Ananda Sukarlan, premiered by the Peruvian baritone Rudi-Fernandez Cardenas with the composer himself on the piano, and have since entered the repertoire of vocal music for baritone and piano.

== Biography ==
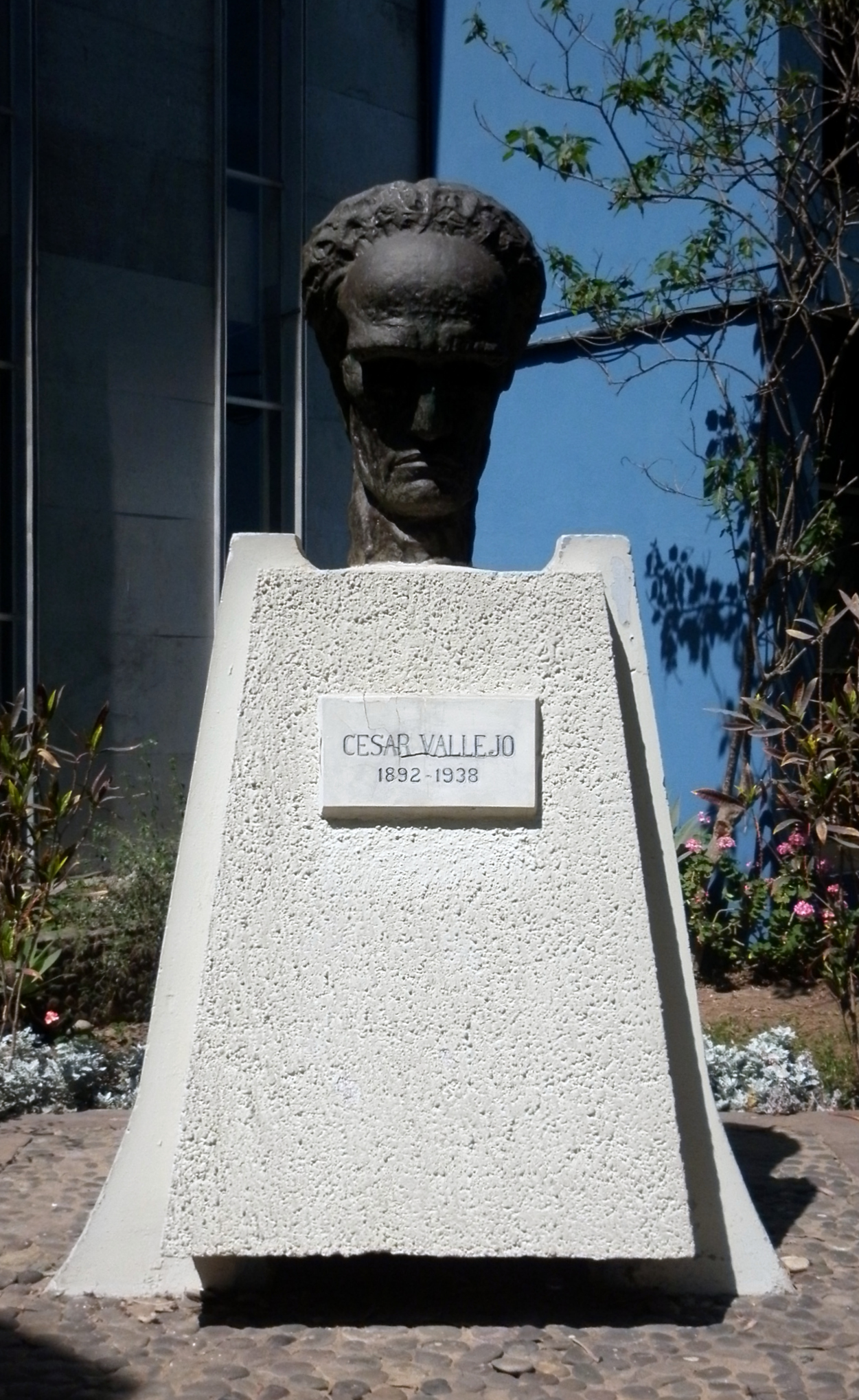
Monument to César Vallejo at National University of San Marcos, where he studied.

César Vallejo was born to Francisco de Paula Vallejo Benítez and María de los Santos Mendoza Gurrionero in Santiago de Chuco, a remote village in the Peruvian Andes. He was the youngest of eleven children. His grandfathers were both Spanish priests, and his grandmothers were both indigenous Peruvians.

Lack of funds forced him to withdraw from his studies for a time and work at a sugar plantation, the Roma Hacienda, where he witnessed the exploitation of agrarian workers firsthand, an experience which would have an important impact on his politics and aesthetics. Vallejo received a BA in Spanish literature in 1915, the same year that he became acquainted with the bohemia of Trujillo, in particular with APRA co-founders Antenor Orrego and Victor Raul Haya de la Torre.

In 1911 Vallejo moved to Lima, where he studied at National University of San Marcos; read, worked as a schoolteacher, and came into contact with the artistic and political avant-garde. While in Lima, he also produced his first poetry collection, Los heraldos negros. Despite its stated publication year of 1918, the book was actually published a year later. It is also heavily influenced by the poetry and other writings of fellow Peruvian Manuel González Prada, who had only recently died. Vallejo then suffered a number of calamities over the next few years: he refused to marry a woman with whom he had an affair; and he had lost his teaching post.

His mother died in 1918. In May 1920, homesickness drove him to return to Santiago de Chuco. On the first of August, the house belonging to the Santa María Calderón family, who transported merchandise and alcohol by pack animals from the coast, was looted and set on fire. Vallejo was unjustly accused as both a participant and instigator of the act. He hid but was discovered, arrested, and thrown in a Trujillo jail where he would remain for 112 days (From November 6, 1920 until February 26, 1921). On December 24, 1920 he won second place (first place was declared void) from the city hall of Trujillo for the poem, "Fabla de gesta (Tribute to Marqués de Torre Tagle)". Vallejo competed by hiding his identity with a pseudonym in an attempt to give impartiality to the competition.

In the work, "Vallejo en los infiernos", the author, a practicing lawyer, Eduardo González Viaña revealed key pieces of judicial documentation against the poet and showed deliberate fabrications by the judge and his enemies to imprison him. It indicted the victims but excluded prosecution to those criminally involved. They invented testimonies and attributed them to people who subsequently declared that they had never been to Santiago de Chuco, the place of the crime. Finally, the material author was escorted to Trujillo to testify before the Supreme Court. However, on the long journey, the gendarmes, French police officers, that guarded him, shot and killed him under the pretext that he had attempted to escape. Moreover, the author has investigated the other actions of the judge ad hoc. In truth, he was a lawyer for the large reed business "Casagrande" and of the "Quiruvilca" mine where the employees operated without a schedule and were victims of horrific working conditions. All of this highlights the political character of the criminal proceedings. With Vallejo it had tried to mock his generation, university students that attempted to rise up against the injustice and embraced anarchism and socialism, utopias of the century.

The judicial process was never closed. The poet left jail on behalf of a temporary release. Years later in Europe, he knew that he could never return to his home country. Jail and the "hells" revealed in this novel awaited him with an open door.

In 2007 the Judiciary of Peru vindicated Vallejo's memory in a ceremony calling to the poet unfairly accused. Nonetheless, 1922 he published his second volume of poetry, Trilce, which is still considered one of the most radically avant-garde poetry collections in the Spanish language. After publishing the short story collections Escalas melografiadas and Fabla salvaje in 1923, Vallejo emigrated to Europe under the threat of further incarceration and remained there until his death in Paris in 1938.

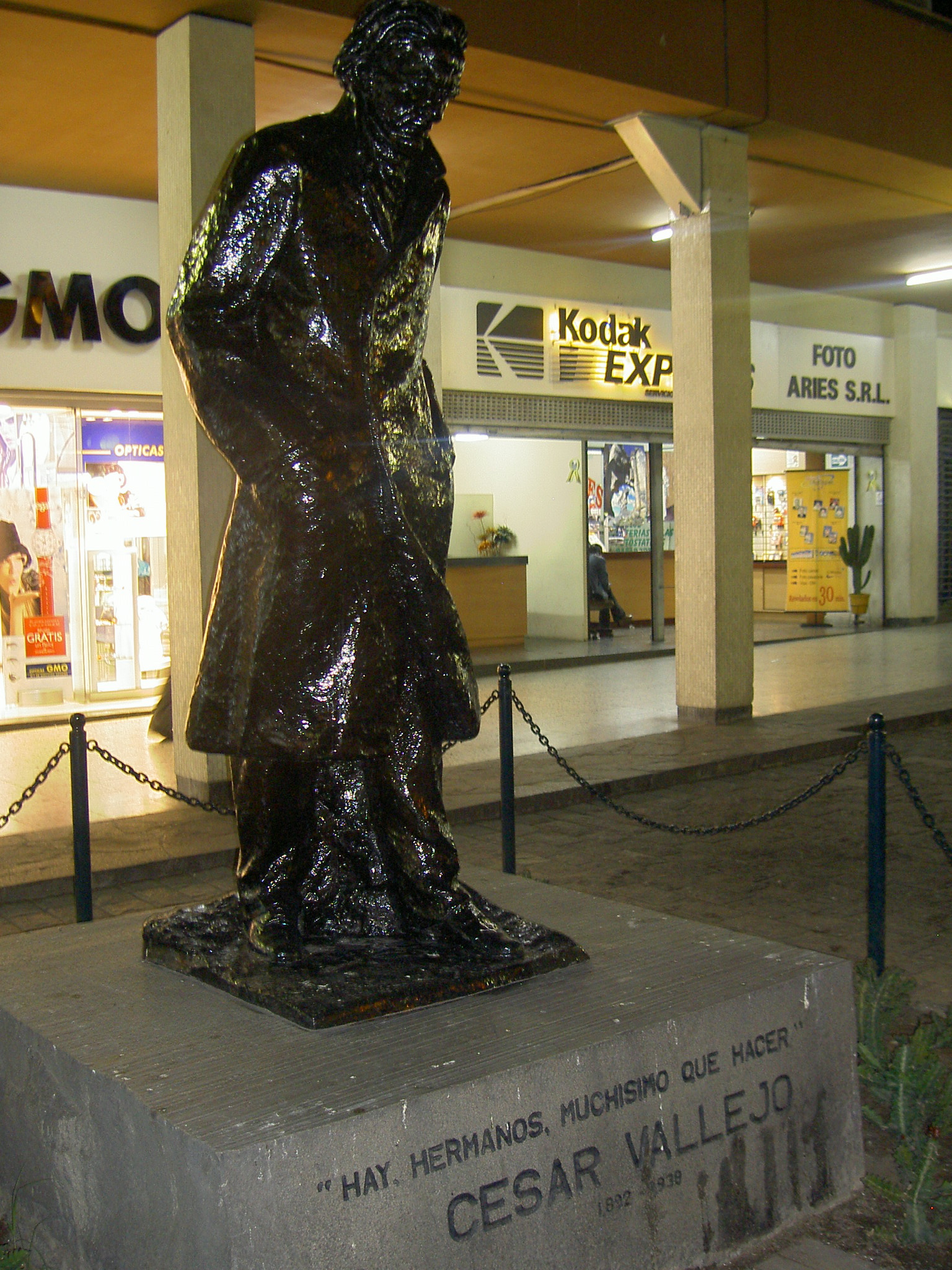
Monument to César Vallejo in Lima. The engraving in Spanish quotes Vallejo "There is, brothers, very much to do."

His European years found him living in dire poverty in Paris, with the exception of three trips to the USSR and a couple of years in the early 1930s spent in exile in Spain. In those years he shared the poverty with Pablo Picasso. In 1926 he met his first French lover, Henriette Maisse, with whom he lived until their breakup in October 1928. In 1927 he had formally met Georgette Marie Philippart Travers (see Georgette Vallejo), whom he had seen when she was 17 and lived in his neighborhood. This was also the year of his first trip to Russia. They eventually became lovers, much to the dismay of her mother. Georgette traveled with him to Spain at the end of December 1930 and returned in January 1932. In 1930 the Spanish government awarded him a modest author's grant. Vallejo became increasingly politically active in the early 1930s, joining the Peruvian Communist Party in 1931. When he returned to Paris, he also went on to Russia to participate in the International Congress of Writers' Solidarity towards the Soviet Regime (not to be confused with the First Congress of Soviet Writers of 1934, which solidified the parameters for Socialist Realism). Back in Paris, Vallejo married Georgette Philippart in 1934. His wife remained a controversial figure concerning the publication of Vallejo's works for many years after his death.

A regular cultural contributor to weeklies in Lima, Vallejo also sent sporadic articles to newspapers and magazines in other parts of Latin America, Spain, Italy, and France. His USSR trips led to two books of reportage he was able to get published early in the 1930s. Vallejo also prepared several theatrical works never performed during his lifetime, among them his drama Colacho Hermanos o Los Presidentes de America which shares content with another work he completed during this period, the socialist-realist novel El Tungsteno. He even wrote a children's book, Paco Yunque. After becoming emotionally and intellectually involved in the Spanish Civil War, Vallejo had a final burst of poetic activity in the late 1930s, producing two books of poetry (both published posthumously) whose titles and proper organization remain a matter of debate: they were published as Poemas humanos and España, aparta de mí este cáliz.

=== Death ===
At the beginning of 1938, he worked as a language and literature professor in Paris, but in March he suffered from physical exhaustion. On March 24 he was hospitalized for an unknown disease (it was later understood that it was the reactivation of a kind of malaria, which he had suffered as a child), and on April 7 and 8 he became critically ill. He died a week later, on April 15, a holy, rainy Friday in Paris. It was not a Thursday, as he seemed to have predicted in his poem «"Black Stone on a White Stone"». His death was fictionalized in Roberto Bolaño's novel Monsieur Pain. He was embalmed. His funeral eulogy was written by the French writer Louis Aragon. On April 19, his remains were transferred to the Mansion of Culture, and later to the Montrouge cemetery.

On April 3, 1970, his widow, Georgette Vallejo, had his remains moved and reinterred in the Montparnasse cemetery.

== Works ==
=== Los Heraldos Negros (1919) ===
Los Heraldos Negros (The Black Messengers) was completed in 1918, but not published until 1919. In the 1993 edited volume Neruda and Vallejo: Selected Poems, Robert Bly describes this collection as "a staggering book, sensual, prophetic, affectionate, wild," and as "the greatest single collection of poems I have ever read." The title is likely suggestive of the Four Horsemen of the Apocalypse, as the book touches on topics of religiosity, life and death.

- Poem: "The Black Heralds"

There are blows in life, so powerful . . . I don't know!
Blows as from God's hatred; as if before them,
the backlash of everything suffered
were to dam up in the soul . . . I don't know!

They are few; but they are . . . They open dark furrows
in the fiercest face and in the strongest side.
Maybe they could be the horses of barbarous Attilas;
or the black heralds Death sends us.

They are the deep abysses of the soul's Christs,
of some revered faith Destiny blasphemes.
Those gory blows are the cracklings of a bread
that burns-up on us at the oven's door.

And man . . . Poor . . . poor! He turns his eyes,
as when a slap on the shoulder calls us;
he turns his crazed eyes, and everything lived
is dammed up, like a pond of guilt, in his gaze.
There are blows in life, so powerful . . . I don't know!

=== Trilce (1922) ===
Trilce, published in 1922, anticipated much of the avant-garde movement that would develop in the 1920s and 1930s. Vallejo's book takes language to a radical extreme, inventing words, stretching syntax, using automatic writing and other techniques now known as "surrealist" (though he did this before the Surrealist movement began). The book put Latin America at the center of the Avant-garde. Like James Joyce's Finnegans Wake, Trilce borders on inaccessibility.

=== España, Aparta de Mí Este Cáliz (1939) ===
In España, aparta de mí este cáliz (Spain, Take This Chalice from Me), Vallejo takes the Spanish Civil War (1936–1939) as a living representation of a struggle between good and evil forces, where he advocates for the triumph of mankind. This is symbolised in the salvation of the Second Spanish Republic (1931–1939) that was being attacked by fascist allied forces led by General Franco. In 1994 Harold Bloom included España, Aparta de Mí Este Cáliz in his list of influential works of the Western Canon.

=== Poemas Humanos (1939) ===
Poemas Humanos (Human Poems), published by the poet's wife after his death, is a leftist work of political, socially oriented poetry. Although a few of these poems appeared in magazines during Vallejo's lifetime, almost all of them were published posthumously. The poet never specified a title for this grouping, but while reading his body of work, his widow found that he had planned a book of "human poems", which is why his editors decided on this title. Of this last written work, it was said"... after a long silence, as if the presentiment of death might have urged him, he wrote in a few months the Poemas humanos."

=== Plays ===
Vallejo wrote five plays, none of which was staged or published during his lifetime.

Mampar is the subject of a critical letter from French actor and theatre director Louis Jouvet which says, in summary, "Interesting, but terminally flawed". It deals with the conflict between a man and his mother-in-law. The text itself is lost, assumed to have been destroyed by Vallejo.

Lock-Out (1930, written in French; a Spanish translation by Vallejo himself is lost) deals with a labour struggle in a foundry.

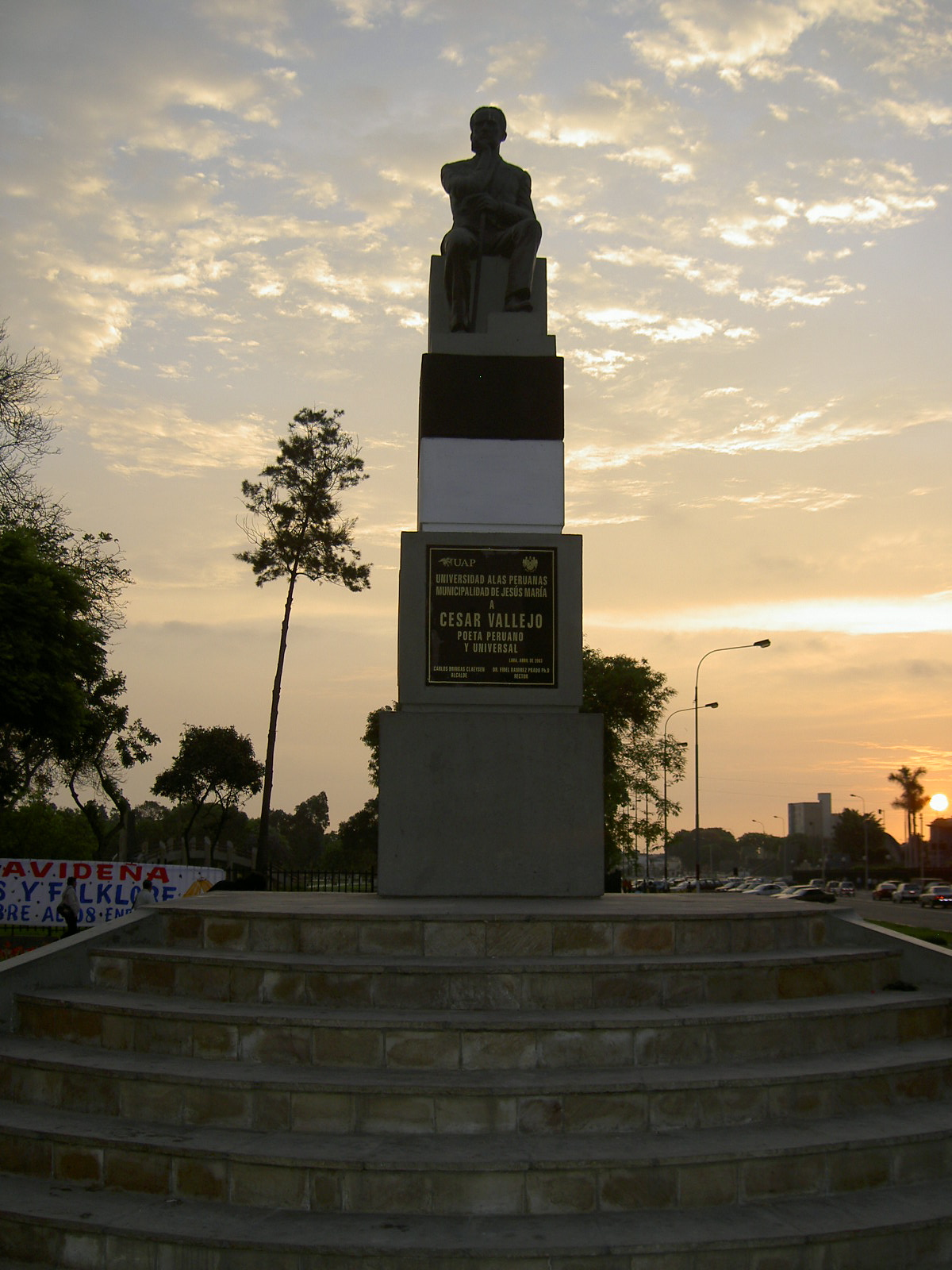
Monument to César Vallejo in the Jesus Maria District of Lima, Peru.

Entre las dos orillas corre el río (1930s) was the product of a long and difficult birth. Titles of earlier versions include Varona Polianova, Moscú contra Moscú, El juego del amor, del odio y de la muerte and several variations on this latter title.

Colacho hermanos o Presidentes de América (1934). Satire displaying Peruvian democracy as a bourgeois farce under pressure from international companies and diplomacy.

La piedra cansada (1937), a poetic drama set in the Inca period and influenced by Greek tragedy.

=== Essay ===
Vallejo published a chronicles book entitled Russia in 1931. Reflections at the foot of the Kremlin (Madrid, 1931) and prepared another similar book for the presses titled Russia before the second five-year plan (finished in 1932 but was later published in 1965).

Also, he organized two prose books about essay and reflection: Against Professional Secrecy (written, according to Georgette, between 1923 and 1929), and Art and Revolution (written between 1929 and 1931), which bring together diverse articles, some which were published in magazines and newspapers during the lifetime of the author. No Spanish editorial wanted to publish these books because of their Marxist and revolutionary character. They would later be published in 1973.

=== Novels ===
El tungsteno (1931). A social realist novel depicting the oppression of native Peruvian miners and their communities by a foreign-owned tungsten mine.

Towards the kingdom of the Sciris (1928) is a historic short story dealing with the Incan theme.

Fabla Salvaje (1924) Literally 'Wild Language', is a short novel which follows the insanity of a character who lives in the Andes.

The children's book, "Paco Yunque", was rejected in Spain in 1930 for being too violent for children. But after it was published in Peru in the 1960s, it became mandatory reading in the elementary schools in Peru.

=== Non-fiction ===
Rusia en 1931, reflexiones al pie del Kremlin (Russia in 1931, reflections at the foot of the Kremlin), first published in 1931, is a journalistic work describing Vallejo's impressions of the new socialist society that he saw being built in Soviet Russia.

Rusia ante el II Plan Quinquenal is a second work of Vallejo's chronicles of his travels in Soviet Russia, focusing on Joseph Stalin's second Five Year Plan. The book, originally written in 1931, was not published until 1965.

== Selected works available in English ==
- The Complete Poetry of César Vallejo (Edited and Translated by Clayton Eshleman. With a Foreword by Mario Vargas Llosa, an Introduction by Efrain Kristal, and a Chronology by Stephen M. Hart.) University of California Press. ISBN 978-0-520-24552-5 (shortlisted for the 2008 International Griffin Poetry Prize)
- The Complete Posthumous Poetry of César Vallejo (Translators: Clayton Eshleman and José Rubia Barcia), University of California Press ISBN 978-0-520-04099-1
- Malanga Chasing Vallejo: Selected Poems of César Vallejo with New Translations and Notes (Edited, Translated and with an Introduction by Gerard Malanga; also includes original and translated correspondence between the translator and Vallejo's widow Georgette de Vallejo) Three Rooms Press. ISBN 978-0-9895125-7-2 (Trade Paperback) and 978-1-9411101-0-2 (ebook).
- Trilce (Translators: Michael Smith, Valentino Gianuzzi). Shearsman Books. ISBN 978-0-907562-72-6
- The Complete Later Poems 1923–1938 (Translators: Michael Smith, Valentino Gianuzzi). Shearsman Books. ISBN 978-0-907562-73-3
- The Black Heralds (Translator: Rebecca Seiferle) Copper Canyon Press ISBN 978-1-55659-199-0
- Trilce (Translator: Rebecca Seiferle) Sheep Meadow Press. ISBN 978-1-878818-12-6
- The Black Heralds (Translator: Barry Fogden) Allardyce, Barnett Publishers. ISBN 978-0-907954-23-1
- The Black Heralds (Translators: Richard Schaaf and Kathleen Ross) Latin American Literary Review Press. ISBN 978-0-935480-43-6
- Trilce (Translator: Dave Smith) Mishima Books. ISBN 978-0-670-73060-5
- Autopsy on Surrealism (Translator: Richard Schaaf) Curbstone Press. ISBN 978-0-915306-32-9
- Cesar Vallejo (Translators: Gordon Brotherstone and Edward Dorn) Penguin. ISBN 978-0-14-042189-7
- Neruda and Vallejo: Selected Poems (Translators: Robert Bly and James Wright) Beacon Press. ISBN 978-0-8070-6489-4
- I'm going to speak of hope (Translator: Peter Boyle) Peruvian Consulate Publication.
- Cesar Vallejo: An Anthology of His Poetry (Introduction by James Higgins) The Commonwealth and International Library. ISBN 978-0-08-015761-0
- Selected Poems of Cesar Vallejo (Translator: H. R. Hays) Sachem Press. ISBN 978-0-937584-01-9
- Poemas Humanos, Human Poems, by César Vallejo, a bilingual edition translated by Clayton Eshleman. Copyright 1968. Grove Press, 1969, xxv + 326 pp. ISBN 978-84-376-0731-3.
- The Mayakovsky Case (Translator: Richard Schaaf) Curbstone Press. ISBN 978-0-915306-31-2
- Tungsten (Translator: Robert Mezey) Syracuse University Press. ISBN 978-0-8156-0226-2
- Songs of Home (Translators: Kathleen Ross and Richard Schaaf) Ziesing Brothers Book Emporium. ISBN 978-0-917488-05-4
- Spain Take This Cup from Me (Translator: Mary Sarko ) Azul. ISBN 978-1-885214-03-4
- Spain, Let This Cup Pass from Me (Translator: Álvaro Cardona-Hine) Azul. ISBN 978-1-885214-42-3
- Trilce (Selections from the 1922 Edition), Vols. 38/39 and 40/41 (Translator: Prospero Saiz) Abraxas Press. ISBN 978-0-932868-07-7
- Trilce (Homophonic translator: James Wagner). Calamari Press. ISBN 978-0-9770723-2-3

== See also ==
- Peruvian literature
- List of Peruvian writers
- Latin American Literature
