= Trilce =

Poety anthology by César Vallejo

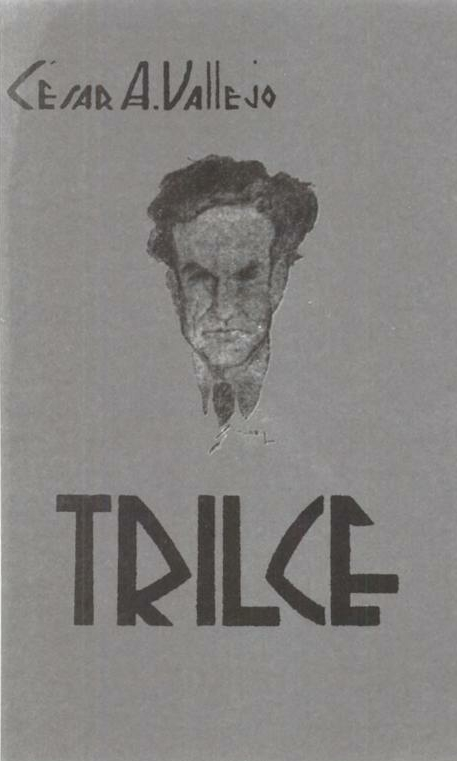
- First edition cover
- Author: César Vallejo
- Original title: Trilce
- Language: Spanish
- Genre: Poetry
- Publication date: October 1922
- Publication place: Peru
- Media type: Print
- Pages: 121 pages of text and XVI of preface

Trilce (Lima, 1922) is the best-known book by the Peruvian poet César Vallejo, and is considered, thanks to its lexicographical and syntactical boldness, as a major work of international modernism and a poetic masterpiece of the avant-garde in Spanish.

== First edition ==
Vallejo began writing the book in 1918. For the most part it was written in 1919, and the last two poems in 1922. The first edition was printed in the workshops of the Penitentiary of Lima, in a short print run of 200 copies.

Trilce began circulating in October 1922. It consisted of 121 pages of text and 16 of prologue, the latter written by Antenor Orrego, fraternal friend of Vallejo. On the cover is a pencil portrait of the poet by Victor Morey Peña.

The selling price of each copy was 3 soles. Publication cost Vallejo 150 soles, which he funded from his winnings in a literary contest held in Lima by the cultural society "Entre nous" in December 1921 (the winning story was Beyond Life and Death, which would later form part of his book of stories Escalas melografiadas).

== In popular culture ==
The Los Angeles-based poet Wanda Coleman mentions Trilce in the second line of her poem "Zed Chronology," which was published originally in Bathwater Blues of 1998.
