= Carlos Hugo Garrido Chalén =

Peruvian writer, poet, journalist and lawyer

- Born: Carlos Hugo Garrido Chalén; 16 October 1951 (age 74); Tumbes, Peru
- Education: National University of Trujillo
- Occupations: Writer; poet; journalist; lawyer; consultant; professor

Carlos Hugo Garrido Chalén (born 16 October 1951 in Tumbes) is a Peruvian writer, poet, journalist and lawyer award winner World Literature "Andres Bello" version poetry, 2009 in Venezuela, this poet has been declared living cultural Heritage of the Nation by the National Institute of Culture (INC) of the Peruvian republic. He studied journalism and law at the National University of Trujillo. Garrido Chalén is one of the present representatives of the North Group that was born in Trujillo city in the first half of the twentieth century.

== Biography ==
He was born in Zorritos district of the Tumbes Province, Peru on October 16, 1951. He studied upper in careers of laws (1970-1976) and journalism (1990-1995) at the National University of Trujillo and postgraduate studies in university teaching at the Federico Villarreal National University. He is a notable student of the National University of Trujillo. He was recognized in 1997 by the National Institute of Culture (INC), with the distinction "Living Cultural Heritage of the Nation".

The writer Carlos Hugo Garrido Chalén is one of the world's most award-winning poets. He is the creator of the literary movement known as the Literature of Totality.

The writer Carlos Garrido Chalén has been a candidate for the Nobel Prize in Literature.

Garrido Chalén is the founding executive president of the Hispanomundial Union of Writers (UHE).

== Work ==
Carlos Garrido Chalén has written poems, some of his work is:

- La Casa del Mamut (2020) Poetry.
- Ni Dios ni los Ángeles tienen religión (2019) Novel.
- La rebelión de los insignificantes (2019) Essay.
- El Muro del abismo (2017) Novel.
- La Estafa Siniestra (2015) Essay.
- Concilio de Luciérnagas (2015) Poetry, personal Literary Anthology.
- No sé leer, pero me escriben (2014) Poetry.
- Si esa es la paz, devuélvannos la Guerra (2013) Essay.
- El Muro del abismo (2013) Novel.
- El Señor de los Tiempos (2012) Essay.
- El Paradigma de la Justicia en El Quijote (2012) Essay.
- El Paradigma de la lealtad en Sancho Panza (2012) Essay.
- Mi mujer me espía (2012) Poetry.
- La función poética del lenguaje (2012) Essay.
- Midiendo a los Decanos (2012) Essay (in collaboration with Sixto Lozano Mayta).
- La vergüenza de los Egrégores (2012) Essay.
- Escribiendo en el humedal (2012) Poetry.
- La noche del coyote (2011) Novel (in partnership with Milagros Hernández Chiliberti).
- La muerte del gallo, según San Pedro (2011) Poetry.
- Los ángeles del viento (2011) Essay.
- La voz de la violencia (2011) Novel (in collaboration with Bella Clara Ventura).
- La Misión del relámpago (2011) Essay (in partnership with Milagros Hernández Chiliberti).
- Un Ángel en el Edén (2010) Poetry.
- La Opulencia Ignorante (2009) Essay.
- La Guerra del engaño (2009) Essay.
- La sombra descubierta (2008) Story.
- Idioma de los espejos (2008) Poetry.
- El sol nunca se pone en mis dominios (2008) Poetry.
- El Regreso a la tierra prometida (2008) Poetry.
- Puntada de zapatero (2008) Essay.
- Confesiones de un árbol, 3rd Edition (2008) Poetry.
- Confesiones de un árbol, 2nd Edition (2004) Poetry.
- Confesiones de un árbol, 1st Edition (1997) Poetry.
- El Sol nunca se pone en mis dominios (1993) Poetry.
- Itinerario del Amor en Vallejo (1991) Essay.
- El Regreso a la tierra Prometida (1986) Poetry.
- La Palabra Secreta (1977) Poetry.
- En Pie de Guerra (1970) Poetry.
- Llamado a la llamarada (1970) Poetry.
- Informes y Contiendas (1969) Poetry.

== Awards and recognitions ==
Among the awards and recognitions he has received are:

- Winner of the award World Literature "Andres Bello" poetry version, in 2009 in Venezuela. Ernesto Kahan, former vice president of the association IPPNW and personal of the Nobel Prize ceremony at IPPNW Peace in 1985, about Chalén Garrido said: "Poets of the stature of the Peruvian poet are like rare gems that appear in special periods of human history".
- World Peace and Justice Prize, Morocco (2014).
- Emeritus Journalist of the Americas – UNESCO, Puerto Rico (2014).
- Honorary Doctor of Literature from the World Academy of Arts and Culture (WAAC), Wisconsin USA (2011).
- International Consultant for the National Peace Center Human Rights of Iraq.
- Founding Executive President of the Hispanomundial Union of Writers (UHE) (1992).
- Co-president of World Nations Writers Union (1992).
- "Living cultural Heritage of the Nation" of the National Institute of Culture, Lima, Peru (1997).
- Full Academician of the Hispano-American Academy of Good Letters of Spain (2014).
- Corresponding Academic of the Academy of Arts and Sciences of Puerto Rico (2014).
- Full Academician of the Ibero-American Scientific and Cultural Academy of Puerto Rico (2015).
- Academic of the Royal Academy of Sciences, Fine Arts and Noble Arts of Córdoba, Spain (2016).
- Doctor honoris causa in Literature from the Latin American Academy of Modern Literature and Society of Mexico (2016).
- Doctor honoris causa from AHCASA Morocco/Mexico: the IFCH of the Kingdom of Morocco and Mil Mentes por México Internacional with the support of the Dicormo Institute and allied organizations (2021).
- Doctor honoris causa from the National University of Tumbes, Peru (2021).
- Doctor of Doctors Honoris Causa of the Hispanic-World Doctoral Cloister of Global Leaders Honoris Causa of Mexico (2022).
- Doctor honoris causa in Humanities from the Latin American Academy of Modern Literature of Mexico (2022).
- Knight of Grace and Magistrate of the Principality of Salina, Italy (2017).
- Universal Ambassador of Peace, Circle of Ambassadors of Geneva-Switzerland-France (2005).
- Professor of the Free Chair of Andalusian Culture, National University of La Plata (2017).

== See also ==
- North Group
- National University of Trujillo
- Trujillo
