= Spain, take this cup from me =

Posthumous collection of poems by César Vallejo

- Title page for España, aparta de mí este cáliz (1939)
- Author: César Vallejo
- Publication date: 1939

Spain, take this cup from me (Spanish: España, aparta de mí este cáliz) is a collection of poems written by the Peruvian poet César Vallejo in the final months of 1937, framed within socialist realism and published after his death in 1939.

The collection comprises a set of fifteen poems, the last of which gives the title to the work. It corresponds to the last period of Vallejo's poetic production, contemporary with the last "Poemas humanos", but the author himself wanted it to form a separate collection of poems, whose unity resided in its theme, inspired by the Spanish Civil War that bled the Iberian Peninsula dry in 1936. The collection of poems was already organized and ready to be submitted to the press at the time of Vallejo's death (April 1938), although the version that says it was still being corrected is false.

In 1994 Harold Bloom included España, Aparta de Mí Este Cáliz in his list of influential works of the Western Canon.

== Bibliography ==
- César Vallejo. Poemas humanos. España, aparta de mi este cáliz. Edited with an introduction and notes by Francisco Martínez García. Madrid, Ediciones Castalia, 1988.
- André Coyné: Medio siglo con Vallejo. Lima, PUCP Publishing House, 2000
- Obra poética de César Vallejo. Lima, Ediciones PEISA, 2002. Included in the Great Library of Latin American Literature of El Comercio, Volume 2, with reading guide.
- España aparta de mí este cáliz. Madrid, Árdora Ediciones, 2013. Facsimile edition of the copy printed in 1938, preserved at the Abbey of Montserrat. With a prologue by Juan Larrea and a drawing by Pablo Picasso. Edited by Manuel Altolaguirre. The facsimile also includes a study by Alan Smith Soto, professor of Spanish Literature at Boston University.
