= Eduardo González Viaña =

Peruvian writer (born 1941)

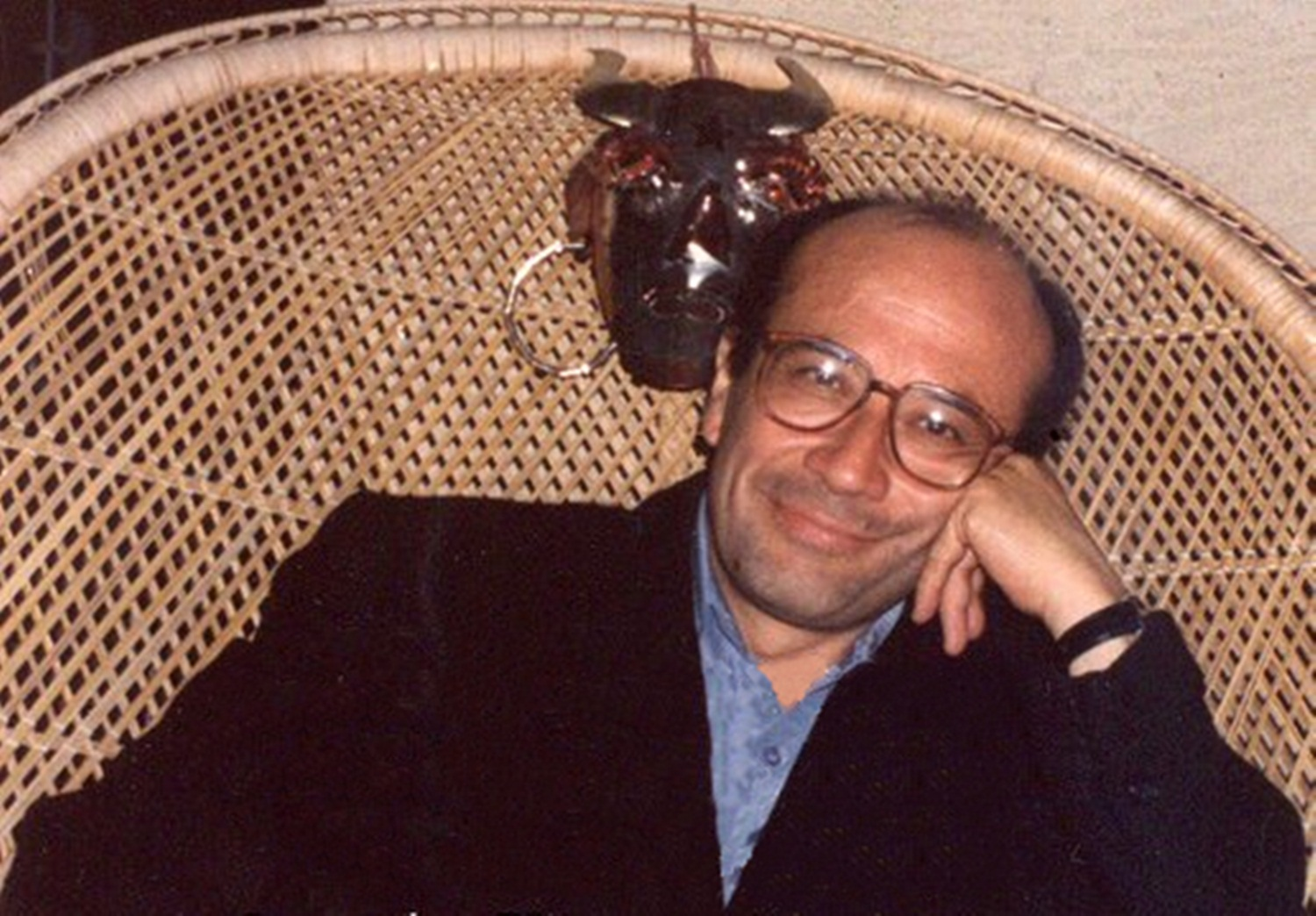
- Peruvian writer Eduardo González Viaña
- Born: Eduardo González Viaña; November 13, 1941 (age 84); Chepén, La Libertad – Peru
- Known for: Novelist, writer, journalist
- Notable work: "Vallejo en los Infiernos" (Vallejo in hells)
- Awards: Novel International Latino Award from the U.S. 2007 (New York. by "El corrido de Dante")

Eduardo González Viaña (born November 13, 1941, in Chepén, La Libertad, Peru) is a writer and professor of Spanish at Western Oregon University.

González Viaña earned a doctorate in Spanish language literature from the National University of Trujillo in Peru, where he also earned a law degree. He moved to the United States in 1990 to become a visiting professor at the University of California, Berkeley. In 1994, he joined the faculty at Western Oregon University where he teaches Spanish language, literature and history.

In 1999, González Viaña was awarded the Juan Rulfo Award for best short stories for the short piece "Siete Noches en California." His novels include Sarita Colonia viene volando (1987), El tiempo del amor (1984), Los sueños de América (2001), Vallejo en los infiernos (2008), and El corrido de Dante (2008).

== Publications ==
- American Dreams, Arte Público Press, 2005. (English translation by Heather Moore Cantarero)
- Dante's Ballad, Arte Público Press, 2007. (English translation by Susan Giersbach Rascon)
- El amor de Carmela me va a matar, Axiara Editions, 2010.

== See also ==
- North Group
