= Jalcophila ecuadorensis =

Conservation status
- Near Threatened (IUCN 3.1)

Scientific classification
- Kingdom: Plantae
- Clade: Tracheophytes
- Clade: Angiosperms
- Clade: Eudicots
- Clade: Asterids
- Order: Asterales
- Family: Asteraceae
- Genus: Jalcophila
- Species: J. ecuadorensis

Binomial name
- Jalcophila ecuadorensis M.O.Dillon & Sagást.

Species of flowering plant

Jalcophila ecuadorensis is a species of flowering plant in the family Asteraceae. It is found only in Ecuador. Its natural habitat is subtropical or tropical high-altitude grassland. It is threatened by habitat loss.
