= James Wagner (poet) =

American poet (born 1969)

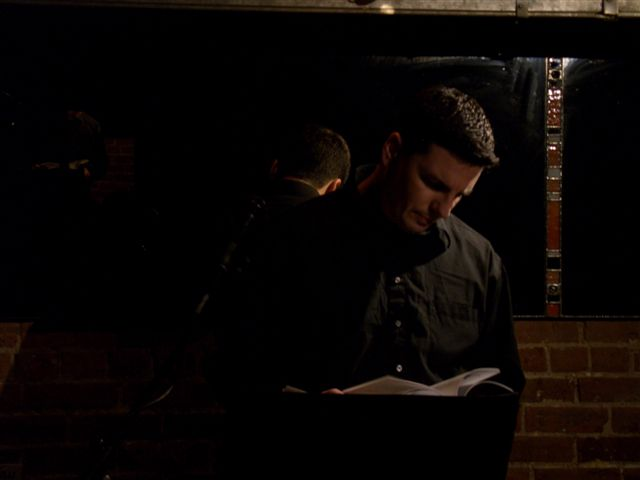
James Wagner (poet)

James Wagner (born 1969) is an American poet. The poet and critic Joyelle McSweeney wrote that the poems in his first collection, the false sun recordings, "form a semi-coherent push-me/pull-you-type dialogue about stability and wholeness, by turns humorous... and serious. In recent works such as The Idiocy and Query/Xombies, Wagner focuses on the searching qualities of human existence, whether through logical argument (and its attendant pitfalls), or through the medium of the search engine, nominally the modern oracle. His third and most recent collection of poetry, Thrown, poems to paintings by Bracha L. Ettinger, was cited by poet Eileen Tabios for its imaginative intensity, ambition and lyrical prowess.

The literary scholar and critic Carla Billitteri has written in an introduction to Wagner’s work given at the University of Maine:

The quality of Wagner’s own poetry reflect the profound cognitive turn caused by homophonic translations, and reflect Wagner’s translinguistic sensibility—his way of thinking his own language from the vantage point of other languages and other cultures. Thus Wagner’s writing often seems to call us—and demands our attention—from a region close, but not too familiar, a region dislocated in time and languages—a region of radical dislocation.

Further, the poet and critic Rachel Galvin has written: “Wagner’s Trilce stakes out its ludic freedom somewhat in the spirit of Vallejo and emphasizes above all its indifference to questions of “fidelity” in translation.” And Michael Smith (poet) and Valentino Gianuzzi, editors and translators of a 2012 edition of Vallejo's poems, call Wagner's Trilce, "the latest homage to Vallejo’s most difficult book."

The poet and critic Laura Sims has written of his first book, the false sun recordings:

James Wagner’s debut collection strikes the reader instantly as a highly musical, humorous and playful chaos …This varied blend of elements supports the inquiry Wagner conducts, via poetry, into how language relates (and does not relate) to meaning and human existence. He prefaces his entire collection, in fact, with a quote from Wittgenstein’s Philosophical Investigations, ‘Can I say ‘bububu’ and mean ‘If it doesn’t rain I shall go for a walk’?,’ which sets the stage perfectly. Instead of feeding us an easy answer, Wagner grapples in plain sight with this and other questions. We, in turn, are inspired to struggle with the ambiguities ourselves, and this greatly enriches our reading experience.

In addition, Wagner has written two books of stories, Work Book and Geisttraum—Tales from the Germans, which focuses on a rural community in Wisconsin haunted, in part, by a priest. The poet and critic Vanessa Place has said of Geisttraum: “Language as solid and fearsome as the religious American Middle West: plain, transparent and similarly constituent of its own allegorical surface. A sussurating surface that threatens always to slip under itself and away.”

Significant influences on his work include: Paul Celan, Marjorie Welish, Leslie Scalapino, César Vallejo, Clark Coolidge, Lissa Wolsak, Tan Lin, Steve Timm, Michael Burkard, Julian Talamantez Brolaski, Paul Maliszewski, John Cage, Buddhist philosophy, Samuel Beckett, Peter Handke, and Werner Herzog.

== Bibliography ==
the false sun recordings (3rd bed, 2003)

Trilce, (Calamari Press, 2006)

Work Book, with drawings by Edgar Arceneaux, (Nothing Moments, 2007)

Geisttraum—Tales from the Germans (Esther, 2010)

Query/Xombies (Esther, 2010)

The Idiocy: Plays (Esther, 2012)

Thrown, poems to paintings by Bracha L. Ettinger (There Press, 2014)

Traces Poems to Paintings, Nava Waxman & James Wagner

https://www.spdbooks.org/Products/9780990800415/traces.aspx
