= Colegio de Biólogos del Perú =

Professional association of biology graduates

Colegio de Biólogos del Perú or College of Biologists of Peru is a professional association in Peru. This college accepts only graduates in biology that have opted to be licensed through a special inter-university procedure called Licenciatura. It was founded in 1972 and its creation was sanctioned by Law.

According to Peruvian law, to work as a professional biologist one must be registered and be a dues-paying active member of the Colegio de Biólogos del Perú. It is governed by a National Dean or President, who is elected every two years by general elections, and presided over a National Council. The National Council is constituted by 18 Regional Councils. As of 2007 it had over 7,000 registered members nationwide; who must be active dues-paying members to exercise their right to vote. Regional Councils are headed by regional deans elected (by popular vote in their respective circumscriptions) by biologists registered in those regions.

In 2006, Peruvian Congress passed Law 28847 that regulates the work of biologists and requires them to be duly registered in the Colegio de Biólogos del Perú to work for government, academia or the private world.

Past National Deans are Isabel Martos, Soledad Osorio, Sandro Chavez, Magdalena Pavlich, and Damisela Coz. The present National Dean is Ernesto Bustamante elected in April 2007 to serve the term 2007–2009.

== See also ==
- Education in Peru
