= Antenor Orrego Private University =

Private University in Peru

- Universidad Privada Antenor Orrego
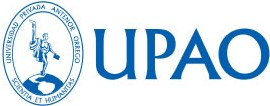
- Motto: Scientia et Humanitas
- Motto in English: Science and Humanities
- Type: Private university
- Established: 26 July 1988
- President: Yolanda Peralta
- Location: Av. América Sur Nº 3145, Urb. Monserrate, Trujillo, Peru; 8°7′38″S 79°1′54″W
- Website: www.upao.edu.pe

The Antenor Orrego Private University is a Peruvian private university located in Trujillo, La Libertad Region. The university was named after the Peruvian journalist and political philosopher Antenor Orrego Espinoza.

== Faculties ==
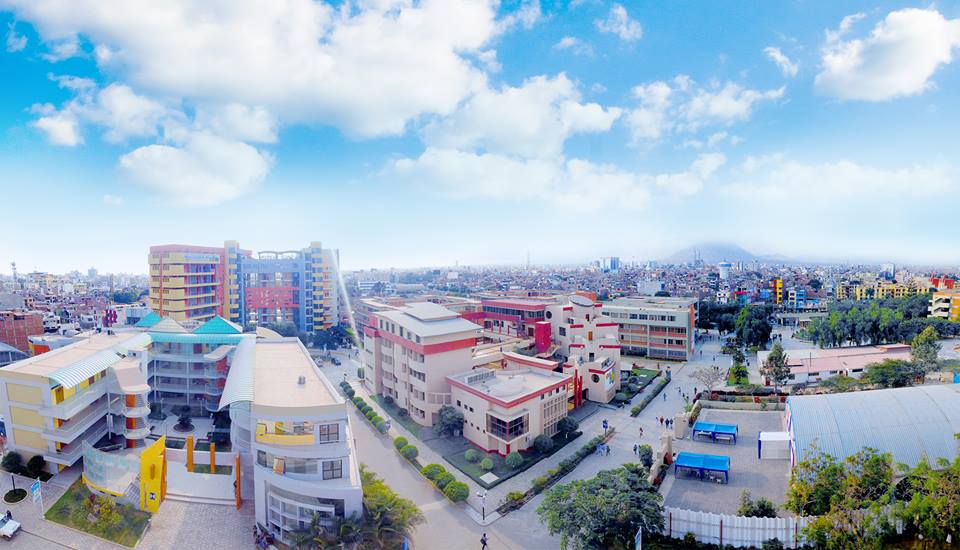
Campus UPAO

=== Faculty of Engineering ===
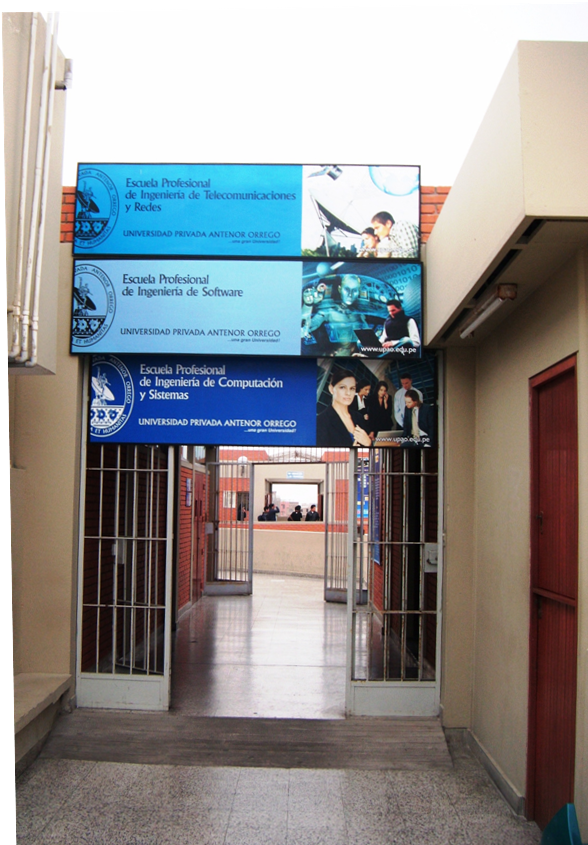
Telecommunications Engineering Department "C" Building - 4th. Floor

- Telecommunications Engineering
- Software Engineering
- Civil Engineering
- Computer Science
- Electrical Engineering
- Industrial engineering

=== Faculty of Human Medicine ===
- Human Medicine
- Psychology
- Dentistry

=== Faculty of Communication Studies ===
- Communication Studies

=== Faculty of Health Science ===
- Nursing
- Obstetrics

=== Faculty of Education and Humanities ===
- Early childhood education
- Primary education

=== Faculty of Economic Sciences ===
- Economics
- Administration
- Accountancy

=== Faculty of Law and Politic Sciences ===
- Law

=== Faculty of Architecture, Urbanism and Arts ===
- Architecture

=== Faculty of Agricultural Sciences ===
- Veterinary medicine
- Agronomy
- Food Engineering

== See also ==
- Victor Larco Herrera District
- List of universities in Peru
