= Paco Yunque =

Children's story by César Vallejo

Paco Yunque is a children's story originally written in Spanish by Peruvian poet César Vallejo and first published (posthumously) in 1951.

== History ==
The story draws on Vallejo's own life experience; for some months, Vallejo had tutored the son of a land owner in the Sierra de Pasco. Vallejo wrote Paco Yunque in April 1931, in response to a request from an editor that he write a children's story. Upon reading the story, the editor rejected it as "too sad"; the work was not published until 1951. It later became required reading in Peruvian schools. Juan Acevedo created a widely read comic-book version of the story.

== Synopsis ==
Paco Yunque is the son of a poor Indian maid, who works for Dorian Grieve, an Englishman. Grieve, a railway manager and the town's mayor, has a son, Humberto, who is the same age as Paco. The story begins with their first school day. At school, Paco Yunque finds a friend in another boy, Paco Fariña, who is protective of him. Humberto however behaves like a nasty bully, and the teacher lets him get away with it, because of the standing Humberto's father has in the community.

When the teacher gives the class a test, Paco Yunque works very hard, while Humberto just doodles in his notebook. When the class goes for a break, Humberto steals Paco's work, rubs out his name, and puts his own name on the paper instead. He then hands Paco's work in, passing it off as his own. Paco, unable to explain what happened to his work, is punished by the teacher with a detention. Humberto, however, gets a good grade and a commendation, on the strength of Paco's work. Paco Yunque is reduced to impotent grief; his friend Paco Fariña tries to console him.
