= Michael O. Dillon =

American botanist (born 1947)

Michael Owen Dillon (born 1947) is an American botanist with the botanical abbreviation M.O.Dillon. He received his BA and MA from the University of Northern Iowa and his Ph.D. from the University of Texas at Austin. He acts as Emeritus Curator of the Field Museum of Natural History and is noted for research on Andean flora. He also contributed work for the Magnolia Society.
