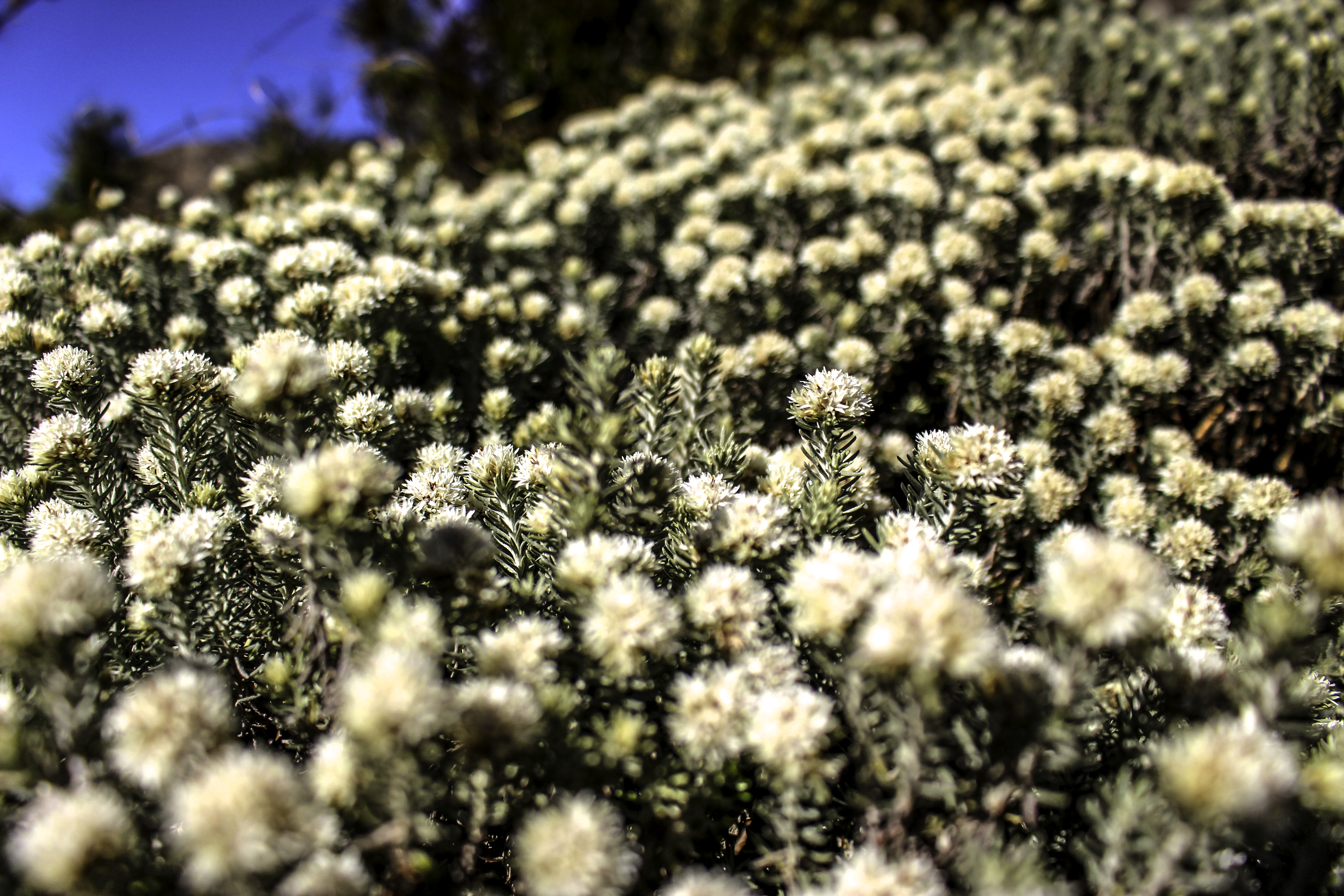
- Chionolaena capitata

Scientific classification
- Kingdom: Plantae
- Clade: Tracheophytes
- Clade: Angiosperms
- Clade: Eudicots
- Clade: Asterids
- Order: Asterales
- Family: Asteraceae
- Subfamily: Asteroideae
- Tribe: Gnaphalieae
- Genus: Chionolaena; DC.

Type species
- Chionolaena arbuscula DC.

Synonyms
- Leucopholis Gardner; Parachionolaena M.O.Dillon & Sagást.; Pseudoligandra M.O.Dillon & Sagást.

= Chionolaena =

Genus of flowering plants

Chionolaena is a genus of flowering plants in the family Asteraceae. It is native to tropical and subtropical regions in the Americas, with species occurring discontinuously from central Mexico to southern Brazil. About half occur in southeastern Brazil.

Plants in this genus are small, woody shrubs and subshrubs. They have leaves with rolled edges, phyllaries with white to opaque tips, and staminate central florets. The plants grow in high-elevation habitat types.

Species

- Chionolaena adpressifolia
- Chionolaena aecidiocephala
- Chionolaena arbuscula
- Chionolaena campestris
- Chionolaena canastrensis
- Chionolaena capitata
- Chionolaena chrysocoma
- Chionolaena columbiana
- Chionolaena concinna
- Chionolaena costaricensis
- Chionolaena cryptocephala
- Chionolaena durangensis
- Chionolaena eleagnoides
- Chionolaena isabellae
- Chionolaena jeffreyi
- Chionolaena juniperina
- Chionolaena latifolia
- Chionolaena lychnophorioides
- Chionolaena macdonaldii
- Chionolaena phylicoides
- Chionolaena salicifolia
- Chionolaena sartorii
- Chionolaena stolonata
- Chionolaena wittigiana
