= Antenor Orrego =

Peruvian writer and philosopher

- Born: 22 May 1892; Lajas, Cajamarca, Peru
- Died: 17 July 1960 (aged 68); Lima, Peru
- Education: National University of Trujillo
- Occupations: Philosopher, politician and journalist

Antenor Orrego Espinoza (22 May 1892 – 17 July 1960) was a Peruvian writer and political philosopher of Basque ancestry. He was a member of the American Popular Revolutionary Alliance (APRA). The Universidad Privada Antenor Orrego (Antenor Orrego Private University), founded in Trujillo, Peru in 1988, is named after him.

Antenor Orrego was born in 1892 to José Asunción Orrego and Victoria Espinoza Villanueva in the Chota Province in the Department of Cajamarca in Peru. He died in Lima, Peru in 1960.

== See also ==
- North Group
