= North Group =

Peruvian intellectual community

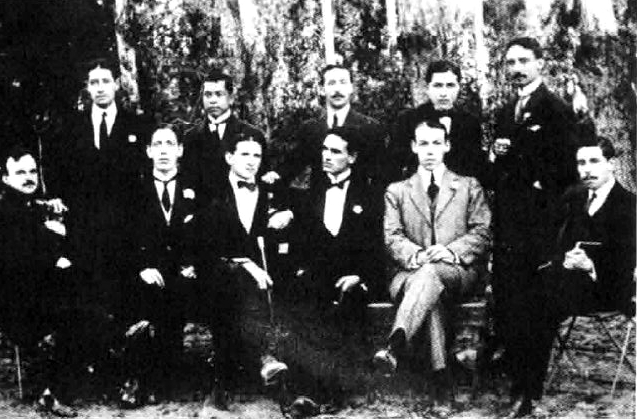
The "bohemia trujillana" or "North Group" in 1916. From left to right, sitting: José Eulogio Garrido, Juvenal Chávarry, Domingo Parra del Riego, César Vallejo, Santiago Martín Lynch, Óscar Imaña. Standing: Luis Sánchez Ferrer, Federico Esquerre, Antenor Orrego, Alcides Spelucín, Gonzalo Sumarán.

The North Group was an intellectual community comprising various writers, artists, philosophers, politicians, and intellectuals from Northern Peru, especially from the La Libertad Region. It was founded in 1915 in the city of Trujillo. At first known as the "Bohemians of Trujillo," the community adopted the name "the North Group" in 1923. Early leaders included journalist Antenor Orrego and poet José Eulogio Garrido. Its most prominent members included poet Cesar Vallejo, politician Victor Raul Haya de la Torre, Alcides Spelucín, Macedonio de la Torre, Juan Espejo Asturrizaga, Francisco Xandóval, and Ciro Alegría. This group inspired the work of Eduardo González Viaña, one of its modern successors.

The North Group was started in order to create artistic and social renewal during the time of global cultural crisis that occurred after the First World War. It was extremely important to the cultural development of Peru, and several of its members were prominent in the fields of literature, philosophy, and social action at the national and international levels.

== History ==
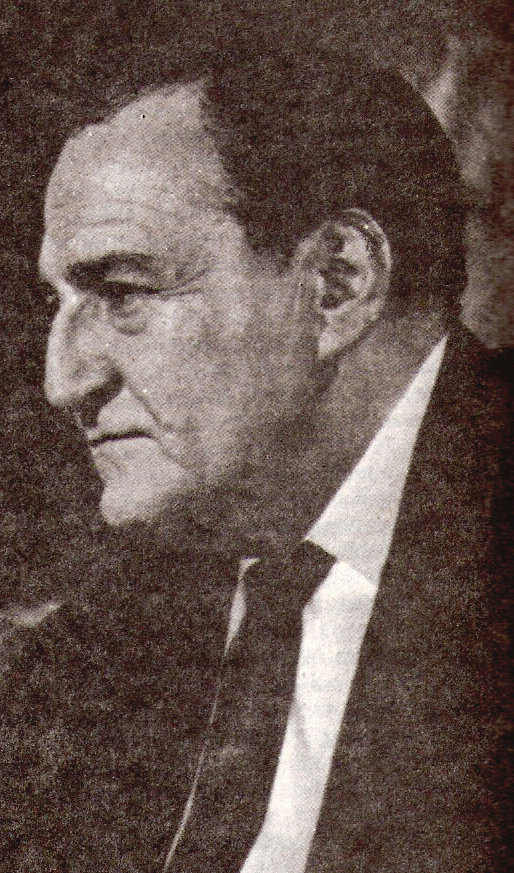
Victor Raul Haya de la Torre, President of the Constituent Assembly of 1978 of the Republic of Peru; he is considered among the most important people of the 20th century in Peru

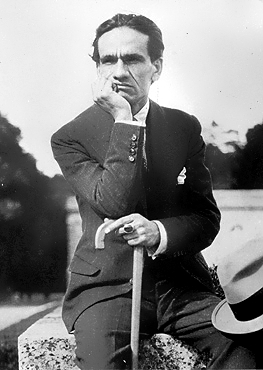
César Vallejo

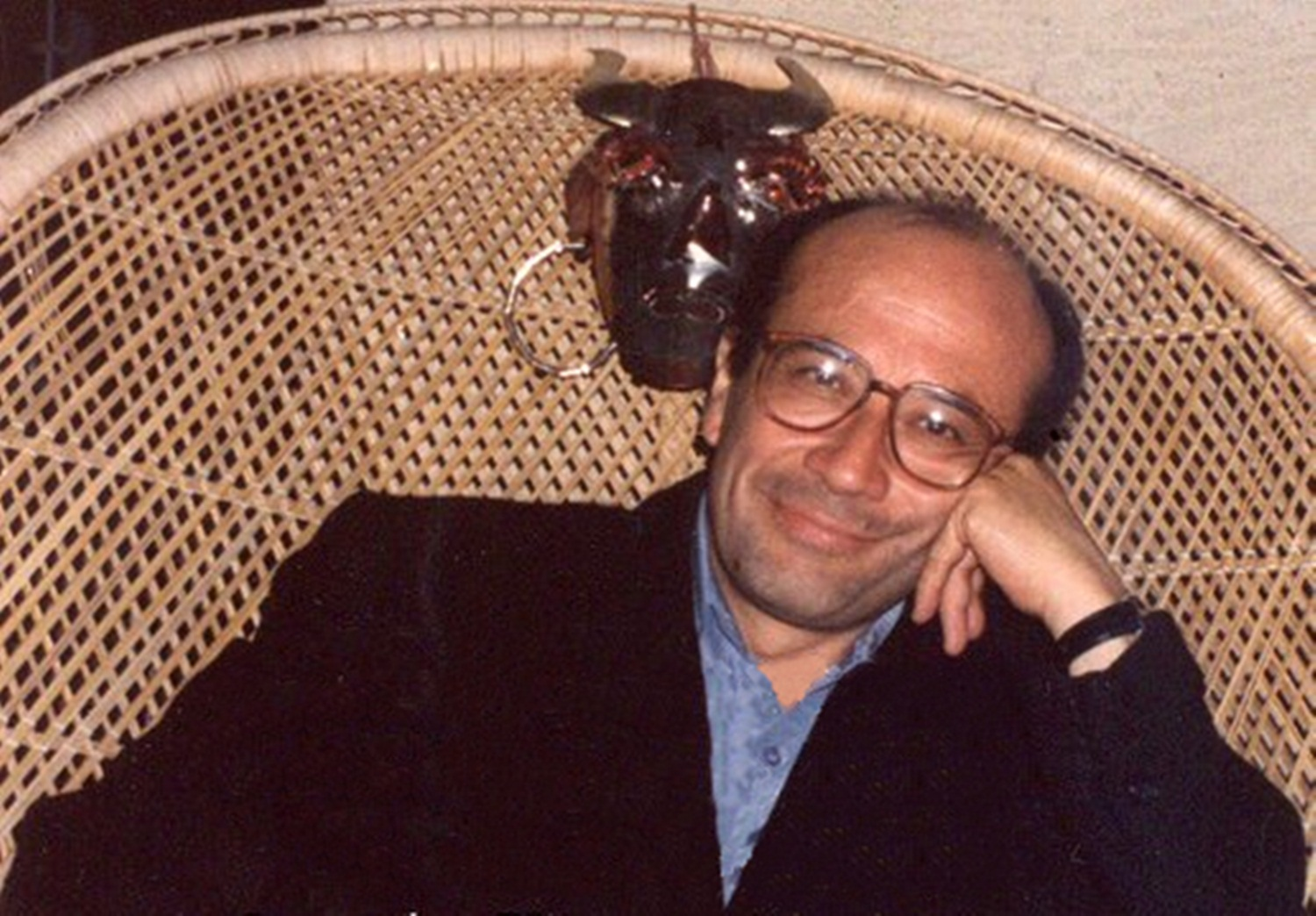
Eduardo González Viaña, author of novel Vallejo in hells.

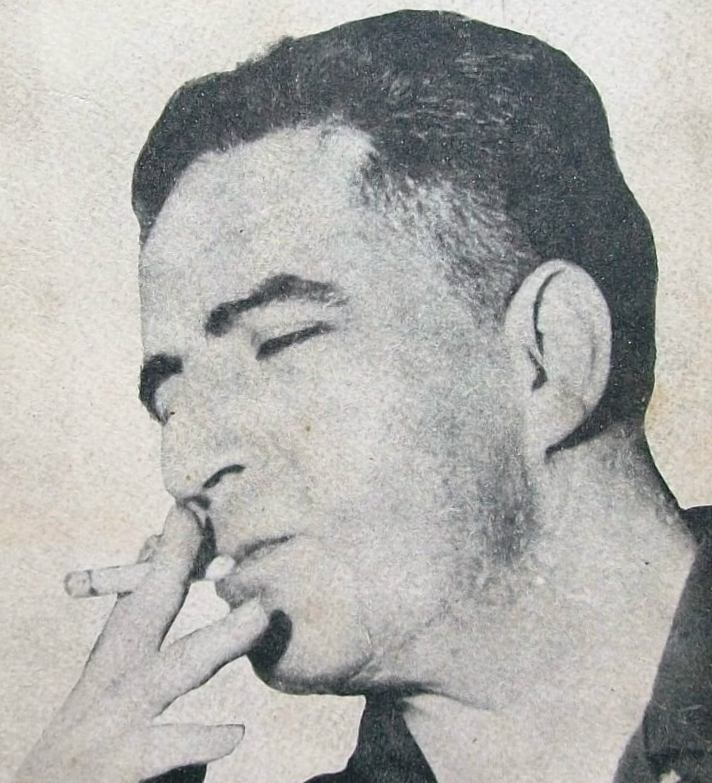
Ciro Alegría classic novelist in Peru.

The North Group, which brought together young students from the National University of Trujillo, was initially led by animator, writer, and philosopher Antenor Orrego. As the author of several books and as the editor of a newspaper and magazine, he led the group in opposition to another trujillano intellectual group, led by the poet Victor Alejandro Hernandez, which was considered to be more traditional and aristocratic. The North Group's purpose, as made explicit later in the prologue to Orrego Trilce (Vallejo poems), was to enhance the "culture and the mental elevation of Trujillo".

The Group adopted the name "Bohemians of Trujillo" following an article written by the poet Juan Parra in Lima magazine (22 October 1916). Parra, who was warmly received on a recent visit to Trujillo, wrote of his admiration for the literary group, calling it by that name. He praised, among others, the poet Vallejo, citing one of his verses.

== Members ==
Representative members of the group and its successors include the following:

- César Vallejo, poet and educator
- Víctor Raúl Haya de la Torre, journalist and political leader
- Eduardo González Viaña, novelist and journalist
- José Eulogio Garrido, poet
- Antenor Orrego, writer, journalist and philosopher
- Alcides Spelucín, poet
- Macedonio de la Torre, painter, sculptor and musician
- Eloy Espinoza, poet
- Óscar Imaña, poet
- Federico Esquerre
- Julio Esquerre
- Belisario Espelucín
- Juan Espejo Asturrizaga, poet and educator
- Francisco Xandóval, poet
- Alfonso Sánchez Arteaga (Camilo Blas), painter
- Carlos Manuel Cox, political leader
- Carlos Valderrama Herrera, musician
- Domingo Parra del Riego
- Juan José Lora, poet
- Jorge Eugenio Castañeda Peralta, Doctor of Laws
- Francisco Dañino
- Manuel Vásquez Díaz
- Néstor Alegría
- José Agustín Haya de la Torre
- Crisólogo Quesada
- Daniel Hoyle, musician
- Alfredo Rebaza Acosta, educator
- Ciro Alegría, novelist and journalist
- Luis Sánchez Ferrer, political leader
- Gerardo Chávez, artist
- Pedro Azabache Bustamante, painter

== See also ==
- La Libertad Region
- Trujillo, Peru

== Selected works available in English ==
- The Black Heralds (Translator: Rebecca Seiferle) Copper Canyon Press ISBN 1-55659-199-3
- Trilce (Translator: Dave Smith) Mishima Books. ISBN 0-670-73060-2
- Autopsy on Surrealism (Translator: Richard Schaaf) Curbstone Press. ISBN 0-915306-32-8
