= List of Peruvians =

Flag of Peru

Coat of arms

This is a list of notable Peruvians.

== Scientists ==
- Santiago Antúnez de Mayolo (1887–1967)
- Javier Arias Stella
- Anthony Atala
- Oswaldo Baca
- Alberto Barton
- G. E. Berrios
- Carlos Bustamante
- Ramiro Castro de la Mata
- Rubén Castillo Anchapuri
- A. Roberto Frisancho
- Juan de Dios Guevara
- Enrique Guzmán y Valle
- Rafael Larco Hoyle
- Federico Kauffmann Doig
- Javier Mariátegui
- Juan Mezzich
- Modesto Montoya
- Carlos M. Ochoa
- Piermaria Oddone
- Orlando Olcese
- Carlos Carrillo Parodi
- Pedro Paulet
- Gustavo R. Paz-Pujalt
- Mariano Felipe Paz Soldán
- Aracely Quispe Neira
- Susana Pinilla
- Gastón Pons Muzzo
- Abundio Sagástegui Alva
- Ruth Shady
- Fernando Silva Santisteban
- Julio C. Tello
- José Tola Pasquel
- Alfredo Torero
- Jose L. Torero
- Mariano Eduardo de Rivero y Ustáriz
- Fabiola Leon Velarde
- Federico Villarreal
- Barton Zwiebach

=== Social scientists ===
- Jorge Aliaga Cacho
- Jorge Basadre
- José Antonio del Busto Duthurburu
- Hildebrando Castro Pozo
- Antonio Cornejo Polar
- Honorio Delgado
- Hernando de Soto
- Alejandro Deustua
- Alberto Flores Galindo
- Maria Elena Foronda Farro
- Gustavo Gutiérrez, theologian
- Mariano Iberico Rodríguez
- Víctor Li-Carrillo Chía
- Guillermo Lohmann Villena
- Manuel de Mendiburu
- Francisco Miró Quesada Cantuarias
- Antenor Orrego
- Walter Peñaloza
- Anibal Quijano
- Liliana Rojas-Suarez
- María Rostworowski
- Rubén Vargas Ugarte
- César Vásquez Bazán
- Carlos Wiesse Portocarrero
- Pedro Zulen

=== Physicians ===
- Daniel Alcides Carrión
- Carlos Manuel Chávez
- Maria Freire
- Max González Olaechea
- Humberto Guerra Allison
- Cayetano Heredia
- Augusto Huaman Velasco
- Arturo Jiménez Borja
- Carlos Monge Medrano
- Augusto Pérez Araníbar
- Hugo Pesce
- Ernesto Pinto-Bazurco
- Laura Esther Rodriguez Dulanto
- Carlos Alberto Seguín
- Hipólito Unanue
- Hermilio Valdizán
- Carlos Vallejos Sologuren

== Writers ==
- Martín Adán (1908–1985), poet
- Katya Adaui (born 1977), novelist
- Ciro Alegría (1909–1967), indigenous novelist
- Marie Arana (born 1949), Peruvian-American novelist, biographer, journalist
- José María Arguedas (1911–1969), indigenous novelist and poet
- Federico Barreto (1862–1929), poet
- Jaime Bayly (born 1965), contemporary novelist
- Michael Bentine (1922–1996), Anglo-Peruvian comedian
- Alfredo Bryce Echenique (born 1939), novelist
- Guillermo Carnero Hoke (1917–1985), writer and journalist
- Carlos Castaneda (1925–1998), literary anthropologist
- Gamaliel Churata (1897–1957), socialist essayist and journalist
- José María Eguren (1874–1942), poet
- Jorge Eduardo Eielson (1924–2006), poet
- Inca Garcilaso de la Vega (c. 1539–1616), chronicler
- Manuel González Prada (1844–1918), modernista poet
- Eduardo González Viaña (born 1941), short story writer and novelist
- Javier Heraud (1942–1963), poet and would-be guerrilla
- Rodolfo Hinostroza (born 1941), influential poet, writer, novelist and essayist
- Luis Jochamowitz (born 1953), journalist and biographer
- José Carlos Mariátegui (1894–1930), socialist essayist and journalist
- Jose Luis Mejía (born 1969), poet, novelist
- Gloria Macher Peruvian Canadian writer
- Clorinda Matto de Turner (1853–1909), novelist
- Angélica Palma (1878–1935), writer, journalist and biographer
- Clemente Palma (1872–1946). writer of fantastic and horror fiction
- Ricardo Palma (1833–1919), folklorist
- Felipe Guaman Poma de Ayala (c. 1535–after 1616), indigenous chronicler
- Santiago Roncagliolo (born 1975), writer, scriptwriter, translator and journalist.
- Julio Ramón Ribeyro (1929–1994), short story writer
- Isabel Sabogal (born 1958), novelist, poet and translator
- Sebastián Salazar Bondy (1924–1964), essayist and poet
- José Santos Chocano (1875–1934), poet
- Manuel Scorza (1928–1983), novelist and poet
- Hernando de Soto (economist) (born 1941), economist and essayist
- Carlos Thorne Boas (1923–2021), novelist, writer and lawyer
- Álvaro Torres-Calderón (born 1975), poet
- Abraham Valdelomar (1888–1919)
- Blanca Varela (1926–2009), poet
- Mario Vargas Llosa (1936–2025), novelist of the Latin American Boom
- Virginia Vargas (born 1945), sociologist
- Cesar Vallejo (1892–1938), influential poet, writer, journalist
- Chalena Vásquez (1950–2016), ethnomusicologist and folklorist
- José Watanabe (1946–2007), poet

== Artists ==
- Pablo Amaringo (1938–2009)
- Mario Urteaga Alvarado (1875–1957)
- Grimanesa Amorós (b. 1962)
- Ana Teresa Barboza (b. 1981), textile artist
- Hugo Orellana Bonilla (1932–2007)
- Teófilo Castillo (1857–1922)
- Diana Quijano (b. 1968), veteran actress
- Martín Chambi (1891–1973), photographer
- Andrea Hamilton (b. 1968), fine-art photographer
- Daniel Hernández (1856–1932)
- Elena Izcue (1889–1970), illustrator, graphic artist
- Daniela Lalita (b. 1992), musician, model, artist
- Mondonguito (1959–2026), comedian and comedic actor
- Carlos Enrique Polanco (b. 1953)
- Irma Poma Canchumani (b. 1969)
- Martina Portocarrero (1949–2022)
- Jorge Vinatea Reinoso (1900–1931)
- José Sabogal (1888–1956)
- Josué Sánchez (b. 1945)
- Basilio Santa Cruz Pumacallao (1635–1710)
- Fernando de Szyszlo (1925–2017)
- Ricardo Silva (b. 1982), musician and artist
- Antonio Sinchi Roca Inka (17th century)
- Diego Quispe Tito (1611–1681)
- Boris Vallejo (b. 1941)
- Alberto Vargas (1896–1982)
- César Yauri Huanay (b. 1962)
- Marcos Zapata (c. 1710–1773)
- Gerardo Chávez (1937–2025)
- Víctor Delfín (b. 1927)
- Elena Tejada-Herrera
- Mario Testino (b. 1954), photographer
- Tom Segura (b. 1979), Comedian

== Public service ==
=== Military ===
- Óscar R. Benavides, early military leader
- Francisco Morales Bermudez, dictator, 1975–80
- Juan Velasco Alvarado, dictator, 1969–1975
- Miguel Grau
- José Olaya
- Jorge Chávez
- Alfonso Ugarte y Moscoso
- Andrés Avelino Cáceres
- Leonor Ordóñez
- Leoncio Prado
- Emilio Cavenecia
- Julio Vargas Garayar, last person executed in Peru

=== Politics ===
- Javier Alva Orlandini
- Antonio Arenas
- Víctor Andrés Belaúnde
- Napoleón Becerra
- Luis Bedoya Reyes
- José Bustamante y Rivero
- Ramón Castilla
- Liz Chicaje (born 1982), indigenous environmentalist
- Yolanda Coco Ferraro (1909–2019), activist and politician
- Héctor Cornejo Chávez
- Nicolás de Piérola
- Graciela Fernández-Baca (1933–2020), economist and politician
- Alberto Fujimori, president, 1990–2000
- Aída García Naranjo (born 1951), educator, singer, and politician
- Alan García Pérez, president, 1985–90, 2001–06
- Juan Manuel Guillén
- Víctor Raúl Haya de la Torre
- Ollanta Humala Tasso, president, 2011–16
- Humberto Lay
- Augusto B. Leguía
- José Carlos Mariátegui
- Sandro Mariategui Chiappe
- Marcela Mitaynes
- Vladimiro Montesinos
- Luis José de Orbegoso
- Jose Pardo y Barreda
- Manuel Pardo y Lavalle
- Javier Pérez de Cuéllar, 5th United Nations Secretary General, 1982–91
- Mariano Ignacio Prado
- Manuel Prado Ugarteche
- Albina Ruiz
- Fernando Belaunde Terry, president, 1963–68, 1980–85
- Patricia Salas O'Brien, Minister of Education, 2011–13
- Luis Alberto Sánchez
- Luis Miguel Sánchez Cerro
- María del Socorro Heysen (born 1960), economist and banker
- Alejandro Toledo, president, 2001–2006
- Mercedes Aráoz, Vice President of Peru, 2016–2020
- Pedro Pablo Kuczynski, prime minister and President, 2016–18
- Martín Vizcarra, governor, vice president and President of Peru, 2018–2020
- Bruno Pacheco, former secretary of the President
- José Manuel Valdés

== Revolutionaries ==
- Túpac Amaru II, Incan revolutionary
- Mariano Melgar
- Mateo Pumacahua

== Terrorists ==
- Abimael Guzmán
- Elena Yparraguirre

== Ancient civilizations ==
=== Hurin dynasty ===
- Manco Cápac
- Sinchi Roca
- Mayta Cápac
- Cápac Yupanqui

=== Hanan dynasty ===
- Inca Roca, Incan emperor
- Yahuar Huaca, Incan ruler
- Pachacuti Inca Yupanqui
- Huayna Capac, Incan ruler
- Huáscar, Inca ruler, 1527–32
- Atahualpa, last Incan ruler

=== Vilcabamba (Colonial Era) ===
- Manco Inca Yupanqui, de facto Incan leader
- Titu Cusi Yupanqui, de facto Incan leader
- Túpac Amaru, de facto Incan leader

== Athletes ==
=== Boxers ===
- Mauro Mina
- Orlando Romero
- Oscar Rivadeneira
- Marcelo Quiñones
- Kina Malpartida

=== Chess players ===
- Esteban Canal
- Jorge Cori
- Deysi Cori
- Julio Granda
- Oscar Quiñones
- Guillermo Ruiz

=== Association football players ===
- Julio Baylón
- José Luis Carranza
- Roberto Challe
- Héctor Chumpitaz
- Luis Cruzado
- Teófilo Cubillas
- César Cueto
- José del Solar
- Jefferson Farfán
- Raúl Fernández
- Teodoro "Lolo" Fernández
- Nicolás Fuentes
- Alberto Gallardo
- José Paolo Guerrero
- Pedro León
- Valeriano López
- Roberto Martínez Vera-Tudela
- Julio Meléndez
- Ramón Mifflin
- Xavi Moreno
- Claudio Pizarro
- Percy Rojas
- Oswaldo Ramírez
- Nolberto Solano
- Hugo Sotil
- Alberto Terry
- Juan Manuel Vargas
- Alejandro Villanueva
- Santiago Acasiete
- Jair Baylón
- Leao Butron
- Daniel Chávez
- Rinaldo Cruzado
- Juan Cominges
- Johan Fano
- Martín Hidalgo
- Hernan Rengifo
- Alberto Junior Rodríguez Valdelomar
- Carlos Zambrano

=== Surfers ===
- Sofía Mulánovich

=== Tennis players ===
- Laura Gildemeister
- Luis Horna
- Alejandro Olmedo
- Jaime Yzaga
- Iván Miranda
- Mauricio Echazú
- Laura Arraya
- Duilio Beretta
- Ignacio Buse

=== Volleyball players ===
- Denisse Fajardo
- Rosa García
- Gina Torrealva
- Natalia Málaga
- Gabriela Pérez del Solar
- Cecilia Tait
- Leyla Chihuán

=== Other ===
- Edgar Prado, jockey
- Jorge F. Chávez, jockey
- Kenny Florian, mixed martial arts
- Antonio Oré, Olympic basketball player
- Jorge Andres, sportscaster

== Beauty queens and models ==
- Juana Burga Cervera
- Helena Christensen, model
- Madeleine Hartog Bell, Miss World – 1967
- Claudia Hernández, Miss Perú Mundo – 2002/2003
- María Julia Mantilla, Miss World – 2004
- Tilsa Lozano, Miss Playboy TV Latinoamerica & Iberia
- Danella Lucioni
- Natalie Vértiz, Miss Peru – 2011
- Gladys Zender, Miss Universe – 1957

== Religion ==
- Sarita Colonia, folk saint
- Saint Rose of Lima
- Saint Martin de Porres
- Pope Leo XIV (Robert Francis Provost), current head of the Catholic Church

== Other ==
- Gaston Acurio, chef
- Lady Bardales
- Analí Cabrera (1959–2011), actress, vedette, and athlete
- Jorge Chávez, airplane pilot
- Raúl Chávez Sarmiento, math prodigy, second youngest bronze, silver, gold medalist at the International Mathematical Olympiad
- Alicia Delgado, folk singer
- Ángel Díaz Balbín, triple murderer and suspected serial killer
- Virgilio Martínez Véliz, chef
- Carlos I. Noriega, astronaut
- Gonzalo Castro de la Mata, ecologist
- Amanda Portales, singer, author, composer, and Peruvian folklore performer
- Luis Miró Quesada Garland, architect
- Richiardi Jr, stage magician
- Pamela Rodríguez (born 1983), singer
- Wenceslao Sarmiento, modernist architect
- Pamela Silva Conde, Emmy award-winning journalist
- Valentina Shevchenko, UFC Women's Flyweight champion
- Luzmila Mahuanca, human rights activist advocating for the rights of Amazonian people
