= Graciela Fernández =

Graciela Fernández may refer to:

- Graciela Fernández Meijide (born 1931), Argentine politician and human rights activist
- Graciela Fernández-Baca (1933–2020), Peruvian economist and politician
- Graciela Fernández, wife of Mexican actor and comedian Chespirito
