= Carlos Ochoa =

Carlos Ochoa may refer to:

- Carlos M. Ochoa (1920-2008), Peruvian plant breeder and botanist
- Carlos Ochoa (footballer) (born 1978), Mexican footballer
- Carlos Ochoa (cyclist) (born 1980), Venezuelan road cyclist
