= Puerto Ricans =

Puerto Ricans: Puertorriqueños
Boricuas
- Flag of Puerto Rico

Total population
- Puerto Ricans: ~9 million Diaspora: ~6 million

Regions with significant populations
- Puerto Rico (2024): 3,063,719
- United States (2024): 6,110,356
- U.S. Virgin Islands (2020): 7,759
- Dominican Republic (2015): 6,083
- Canada (2016): 3,405
- Mexico (2000): 1,970
- Brazil (2025): 621
- Netherlands (2019): 241

Languages
- Mostly Spanish; also English and Spanglish

Religion
- Catholicism; Protestantism

Related ethnic groups
- Spaniards; Canarians; Taínos; Black Latin Americans; White Latin Americans; Dominicans; Cubans; Venezuelans; Colombians; Panamanians; Mexicans; Brazilians; Virgin Islanders; other Americans mainland USA; other Latin Americans; other Caribbean people; Mulatto; Mestizo

Puerto Ricans (Spanish: Puertorriqueños, [pweɾtoriˈkeɲos]), commonly referred to using the endonym Boricuas, (Note: The term Boricua is gender-neutral, whereas the terms Puertorriqueño, Borinqueño, Borincano, and Puertorro are male-specific when ending in "o" and female-specific when ending in "a".) but also occasionally referred to as Borinqueños, Borincanos, (Note: The terms Boricua, Borinqueños, and Borincanos derive from "Boriquen"/"Borinquen", an Indigenous Taíno name for Puerto Rico.) or Puertorros, (Note: The term Puertorro/-a is used popularly, spontaneously, and politely to refer to Puerto Ricans or Puerto Rico. It is occasionally mistaken for a pejorative, but the term is not considered offensive by Puerto Ricans. It has been most famously used by Puerto Rican musicians, including Bobby Valentín in his song "Soy Boricua" (1972), Andy Montañez in "En Mi Puertorro" (2006), and Bad Bunny in "ACHO PR" (2023).) are an ethnic group based in the Caribbean archipelago and island of Puerto Rico, and a nation identified with the Commonwealth of Puerto Rico through ancestry, culture, or history. Puerto Ricans are predominately a tri-racial pardo, Spanish-speaking, Christian society, descending in varying degrees from Indigenous peoples (including the Ciguayos, Macorix, and Taínos), Spanish and other European colonists, and West and Central African slaves, freedmen, and free Blacks. As citizens of a U.S. territory, Puerto Ricans have automatic birthright American citizenship, and are considerably influenced by American culture. The population of Puerto Ricans is between 9 and 10 million worldwide, with the overwhelming majority residing in Puerto Rico and the mainland United States.

== Overview ==
The culture held in common by most Puerto Ricans is referred to as a Western culture largely derived from the traditions of Spain, and more specifically Andalusia and the Canary Islands. Puerto Rico has also received immigration from other parts of Spain such as Catalonia, as well as from other European countries such as France, Ireland, Italy and Germany. Puerto Rico has also been influenced by African culture, with many Puerto Ricans partially descended from Africans; Afro-Puerto Ricans of unmixed African descent are a minority. Studies in population genetics have concluded that Puerto Rican gene pool is on average predominantly European, with a significant Sub-Saharan African, North African Guanche, and Indigenous American substrate, the latter two originating partly from the Indigenous people of the Canary Islands as well as Indigenous peoples of the Americas, such as Puerto Rico's pre-Columbian Taíno inhabitants.

The population of Puerto Ricans and descendants is estimated to be between 8 and 10 million worldwide, with most living on the islands of Puerto Rico and in the United States mainland. Within the United States, Puerto Ricans are present in all states, and the states with the largest populations of Puerto Ricans are New York, Florida, New Jersey, and Pennsylvania, with large populations also in Massachusetts, Connecticut, California, Illinois, and Texas.

For 2009, the American Community Survey estimates give a total of 3,859,026 Puerto Ricans classified as "Native" Puerto Ricans. It also gives a total of 3,644,515 (91.9%) of the population being born in Puerto Rico and 201,310 (5.1%) born in the United States. The total population born outside Puerto Rico is 322,773 (8.1%). Of the 108,262 who were foreign born outside the United States (2.7% of Puerto Ricans), 92.9% were born in Latin America, 3.8% in Europe, 2.7% in Asia, 0.2% in Northern America, and 0.1% in Africa and Oceania each.

== Number of Puerto Ricans ==
=== Population (1765–1897) ===
The demographics during Spanish rule of Puerto Rico were:

Ethnic composition of Puerto Rico 1765 – 1897
1765	Population	Percent	1802	Population	Percent	1897	Population	Percent
White	17,572	39.2%	White	78,281	48.0%	White	573,187	64.3%
African^{2}	5,037	11.2%	African	16,414	10.0%	African	75,824	8.6%
Other (incl: African, Mulatto, Indigenous)^{1}	22,274	49.6%	Mulatto	55,164	33.8%	Mixed	241,900	27.1%
-	-	-	Other African^{2}	13,333	8.2%	-	-	-
Puerto Rico	44,833	100.0%	(Spain) Puerto Rico	163,192	100.0%	(Spain) Puerto Rico	890,911	100.0%
Sources: 1765 (First) Census, 1802 Census, 1897 Census. ^1Indigenous: Taíno and Arawak peoples. ^2Slave population.

=== Current population and ethnic identity (2020) ===
Self-identified racial and ethnic composition in Puerto Rico – 2020 Census
Ethnicity
White (560,592)	17.1%
Black or African American (228,711)	7.0%
Asian (4,001)	0.1%
Two or more races (1,635,791)	49.8%
American Indian (17,870)	0.5%
Native Hawaiian and Other Pacific Islander (593)	0.0%
Other races (838,316)	25.5%
Total: 3,285,874	100.0%

== Ancestry and genetics ==
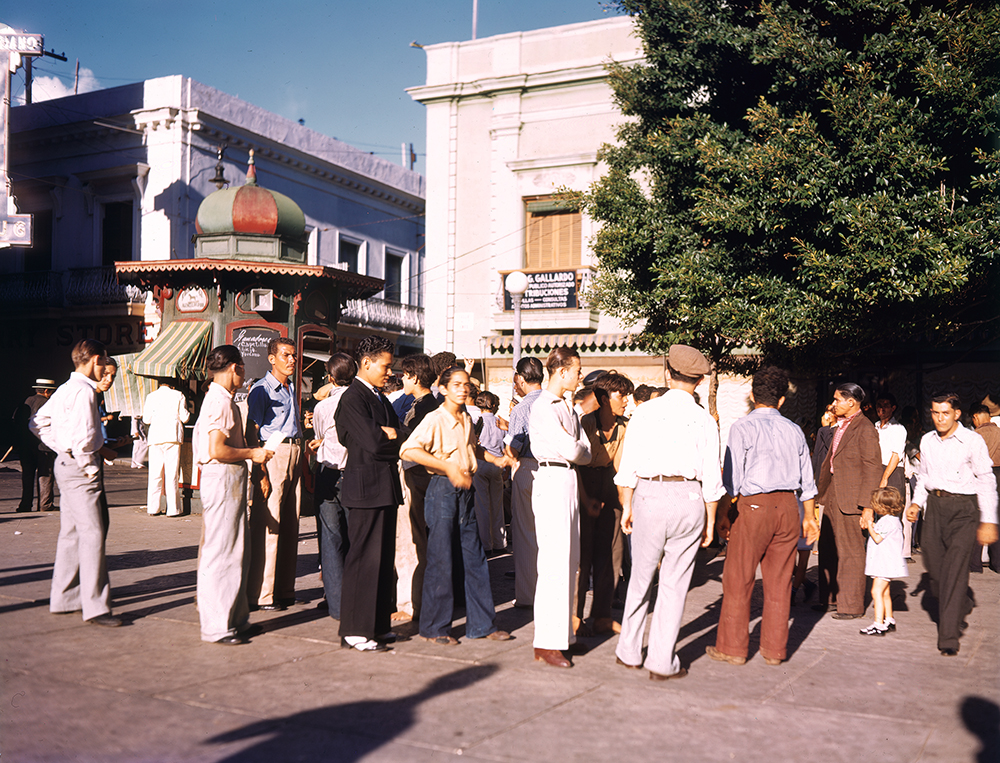
Crowd gathering on a street in Puerto Rico in 1939, photographed by Robert Yarnall Richie

The original inhabitants of Puerto Rico were Indigenous peoples, including the Taíno, who called the island Borinquen or Boriquen; however, as in other parts of the Americas, the Native people soon diminished in number after the arrival of Spanish settlers. Besides miscegenation, the negative impact on the numbers of Amerindian people, especially in Puerto Rico, was almost entirely the result of Old World diseases that the Amerindians had no natural/bodily defenses against, including measles, chicken pox, mumps, influenza, and even the common cold. In fact, it was estimated that the majority of all the Amerindian inhabitants of the New World died out due to contact and contamination with those Old World diseases, while those that survived were further reduced through deaths by warfare with Spanish colonizers and settlers.

Thousands of Spanish settlers also immigrated to Puerto Rico from the Canary Islands during the 18th and 19th centuries, so many so that whole Puerto Rican villages and towns were founded by Canarian immigrants, and their descendants would later form a majority of the population on the island.

In 1791, the slaves in Saint-Domingue (Haiti) revolted against their French masters. Many of the French escaped to Puerto Rico via what is now the Dominican Republic and settled in the west coast of the island, especially in Mayagüez. Some Puerto Ricans are of British heritage, most notably Scottish people and English people who came to reside there in the 17th and 18th centuries.

When Spain revived the Royal Decree of Graces of 1815 with the intention of attracting non-Spanish Europeans to settle in the island, thousands of Corsicans (though the island was French since 1768 the population spoke an Italian dialect similar to Tuscan Italian) during the 19th century immigrated to Puerto Rico, along with German immigrants as well as Irish immigrants who were affected by the Great Famine of the 1840s, immigrated to Puerto Rico. They were followed by smaller waves from other European countries and China.

During the early 20th century Jews began to settle in Puerto Rico. The first large group of Jews to settle in Puerto Rico were European refugees fleeing German–occupied Europe in the 1930s and 1940s. The second influx of Jews to the island came in the 1950s, when thousands of Cuban Jews fled Cuba after Fidel Castro came to power.

=== Ethnogenesis ===
The Native Taíno population began to dwindle, with the arrival of the Spanish in the 16th century, through disease and intermarriage. Many Spaniard men took Taíno and West African wives and in the first centuries of the Spanish colonial period the island was overwhelmingly racially mixed. "By 1530 there were 14 Native women married to Spaniards, not to mention Spaniards with concubines." Under Spanish rule, mass immigration shifted the ethnic make-up of the island, as a result of the Royal Decree of Graces of 1815. Puerto Rico went from being two-thirds black and mulatto in the beginning of the 19th century, to being nearly 80% white by the middle of the 20th century. This was compounded by more flexible attitudes to race under Spanish rule, as epitomized by the Regla del Sacar. Under Spanish rule, Puerto Rico had laws such as Regla del Sacar or Gracias al Sacar, which allowed persons of mixed ancestry to pay a fee to be classified as white, which was the opposite of the one-drop rule in US society after the American Civil War.

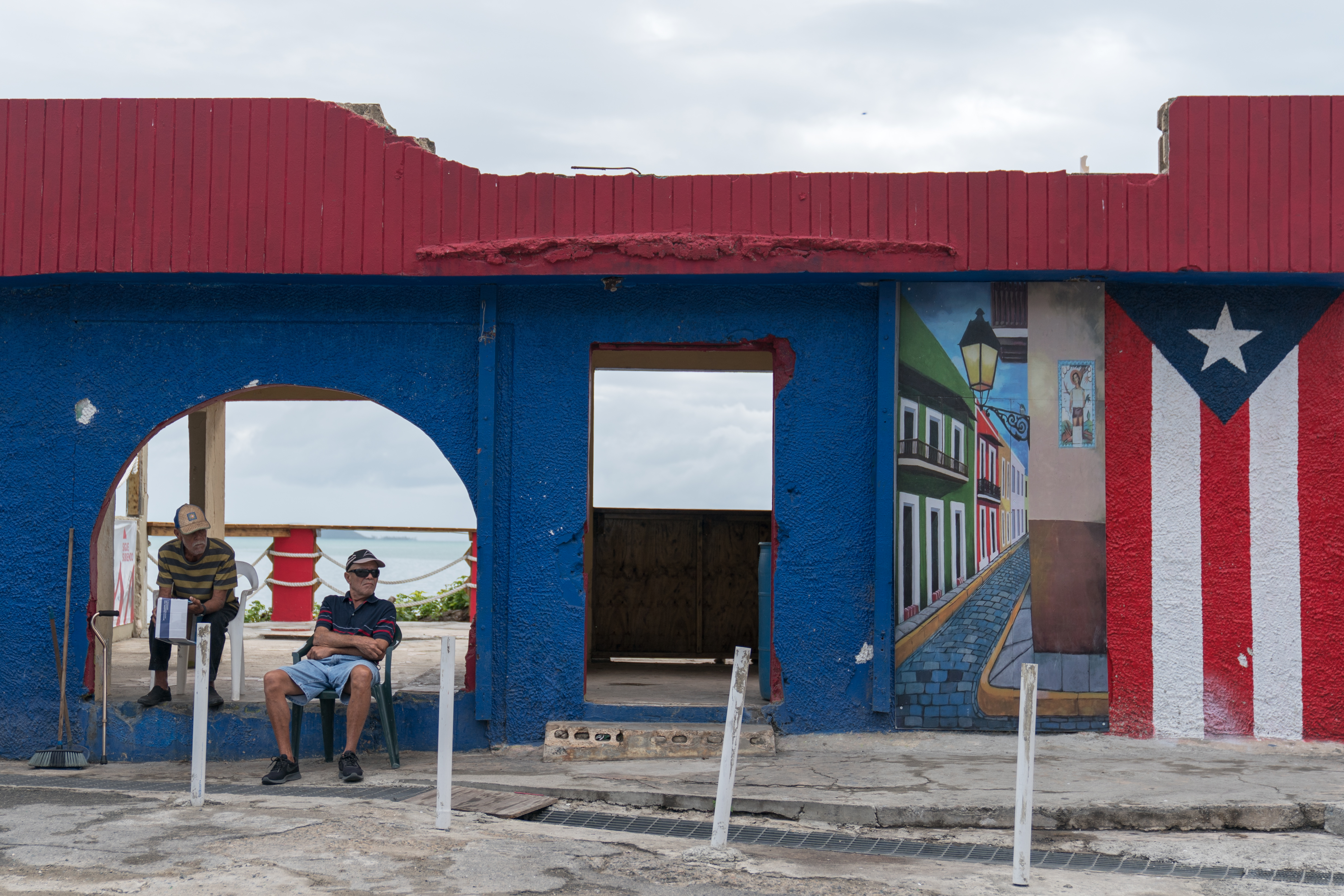
Two men sit by the side of a road with the ocean behind them in Puerto Rico.

Studies have shown that the racial ancestry mixture of the average Puerto Rican (regardless of racial self-identity) is about 64% European, 21% African, and 15% Indigenous, with European ancestry strongest on the west side of the island and West African ancestry strongest on the east side, and the levels of Indigenous ancestry (which, according to some research, ranges from about 5%-35%) generally highest in the southwest of the island.

A study of a sample of 96 healthy self-identified White Puerto Ricans and self-identified Black Puerto Ricans in the U.S. showed that, although all carried a contribution from all 3 ancestral populations (European, African, and Amerindian), the proportions showed significant variation. Depending on individuals, although often correlating with their self-identified race, African ancestry ranged from less than 10% to over 50%, while European ancestry ranged from under 20% to over 80%. Amerindian ancestry showed less fluctuation, generally hovering between 5% and 20% irrespective of self-identified race.

The majority of the European ancestry in Puerto Ricans comes from southern Spain, more specifically the Canary Islands; this is also true for many Dominicans and Cubans. Canarians are of partial Guanche ancestry, a North African Berber ethnic group who were the original inhabitants before Spanish conquest. This means that by extension, many Puerto Ricans have minuscule amounts of North African blood through the Indigenous Guanches of the Canary Islands.

== Race and ethnicity ==
=== White ===
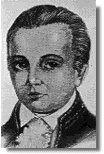
Ramón Power y Giralt was a Puerto Rican military officer and politician

In the 1899 census, taken the year Spain ceded Puerto Rico to the United States following its invasion and annexation in the Spanish–American War, 61.8% of the people were identified as White. In the 2020 United States census the total of Puerto Ricans that self-identified as White was 17.1% or 560,592 out of the 3,285,874 people living in Puerto Rico, down from 75.8% in the 2010 Census, reflecting a change in perceptions of race in Puerto Rico. For every United States census until 2010, most Puerto Ricans self identified as "white".

The European ancestry of Puerto Ricans comes primarily from one source: Spaniards (including Canarians, Catalans, Castilians, Galicians, Asturians, Andalusians, and Basques). The Canarian cultural influence in Puerto Rico is one of the most important components in which many villages were founded from these immigrants, which started from 1493 to 1890 and beyond. Many Spaniards, especially Canarians, chose Puerto Rico because of its Hispanic ties and relative proximity in comparison with other former Spanish colonies. They searched for security and stability in an environment similar to that of the Canary Islands and Puerto Rico was the most suitable. This began as a temporary exile which became a permanent relocation and the last significant wave of Spanish or European migration to Puerto Rico.

Other sources of European populations are Corsicans, French, Italians, Portuguese (especially Azoreans), Greeks, Germans, Irish, Scots, Maltese, Dutch, English, and Danes.

=== Black ===
In the 2020 census, 7.0% of people self-identified as Black. Africans were brought by Spanish Conquistadors. The vast majority of the Africans who were brought to Puerto Rico did so as a result of the Atlantic slave trade, which took people from many groups in the African continent. The slave trade particularly took West Africans including the Yoruba and Igbo peoples, and Central Africans like the Kongo people.

=== Indigenous ===
Indigenous people make up the third largest racial identity among Puerto Ricans, comprising 0.5% of the population, although this self-identification may be ethno-political in nature since unmixed Indigenous people no longer exist as a discrete genetic population. Native American admixture in Puerto Ricans ranges between about 5% and 35%, with around 15% being the approximate average.

Puerto Rico's self-identified Indigenous population therefore consist mostly of Indigenous-identified persons (oftentimes with predominant Indigenous ancestry, but not always) from within the genetically mestizo population of mixed European and Amerindian ancestry, even when most other Puerto Ricans of their exact same mixture would identify either as mixed-race or even as white.

=== Asian ===
For its 2020 census, the U.S. Census Bureau listed the following groups to constitute "Asian": Asian Indian, Bangladeshi, Bhutanese, Cambodian, Chinese, Filipino, Hmong, Indonesian, Japanese, Korean, Laotian, Malaysian, Nepalese, Pakistani, Sri Lankan, Taiwanese, Thai, Vietnamese, and Other Asian. Though, the largest groups come from China and India. These groups represented 0.1% of the population.

=== Other ===
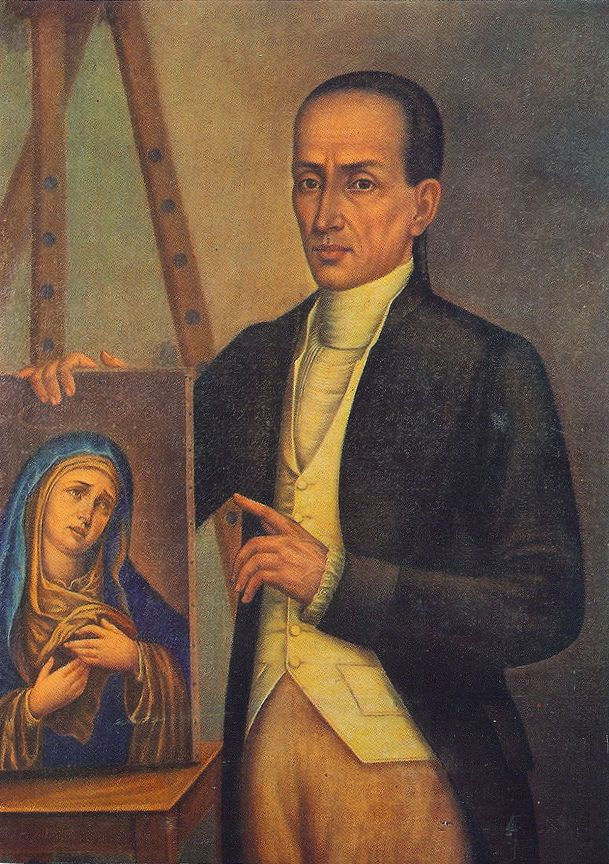
José Campeche is the first known Puerto Rican visual artist.

People of "Some other race alone" or "Two or more races" constituted 75.3% of the population in the 2020 Census.

Although the average Puerto Rican is of mixed race, few actually identified as multiracial ("two or more races") in the 2010 census; only 3.3% did so. They more often identified with their predominant heritage or phenotype. However, in the 2020 census, the amount of Puerto Ricans identifying as multiracial went up to 49.8% and an additional 25.5% identified as "some other race", showing a marked change in the way Puerto Ricans view themselves. This may show that Puerto Ricans are now more open to embracing all sides of their mixed-race heritage and do not view themselves as part of the standard race dynamic in the United States—hence the high number of people identifying as "some other race." A similar phenomenon went on in the mainland United States with the overall US Hispanic/Latino population. Most have significant ancestry from two or more of the founding source populations of Spaniards, Africans, and Indigenous people, although Spanish ancestry is predominant in a majority of the population. Small amounts of Puerto Ricans may have additional ancestries from other parts of the world. Similar to many other Latin American ethnic groups, Puerto Ricans are multi-generationally mixed race, though most are European-dominant in ancestry; Puerto Ricans who are "evenly mixed" can accurately be described as "Mulatto", "Quadroon", or Tri-racial, very similar to mixed populations in Cuba and the Dominican Republic. According to the National Geographic Genographic Project, "the average Puerto Rican individual carries 12% Native American, 65% West Eurasian (Mediterranean, Northern European and/or Middle Eastern) and 20% Sub-Saharan African DNA."

In genetic terms, even many of those of pure Spanish origin would have North and, in some cases, West African ancestry brought from founder populations, particularly in the Canary Islands. Along with European, West African, and Indigenous, many Puerto Ricans have small amounts of North African blood due to settlers from Canary Islands, the Spanish province from which most Puerto Ricans draw their European ancestry, being of partial North African blood. Very few self-identified Black Puerto Ricans are of unmixed African ancestry, while a genetically unmixed Amerindian population in Puerto Rico is technically extinct despite a minuscule segment of self-identified Amerindian Puerto Ricans due to a minor Amerindian component in their ancestral mixture. Research data shows that 60% of Puerto Ricans carry maternal lineages of Native American origin and the typical Puerto Rican has between 5% and 15% Native American admixture.

=== Modern identity ===
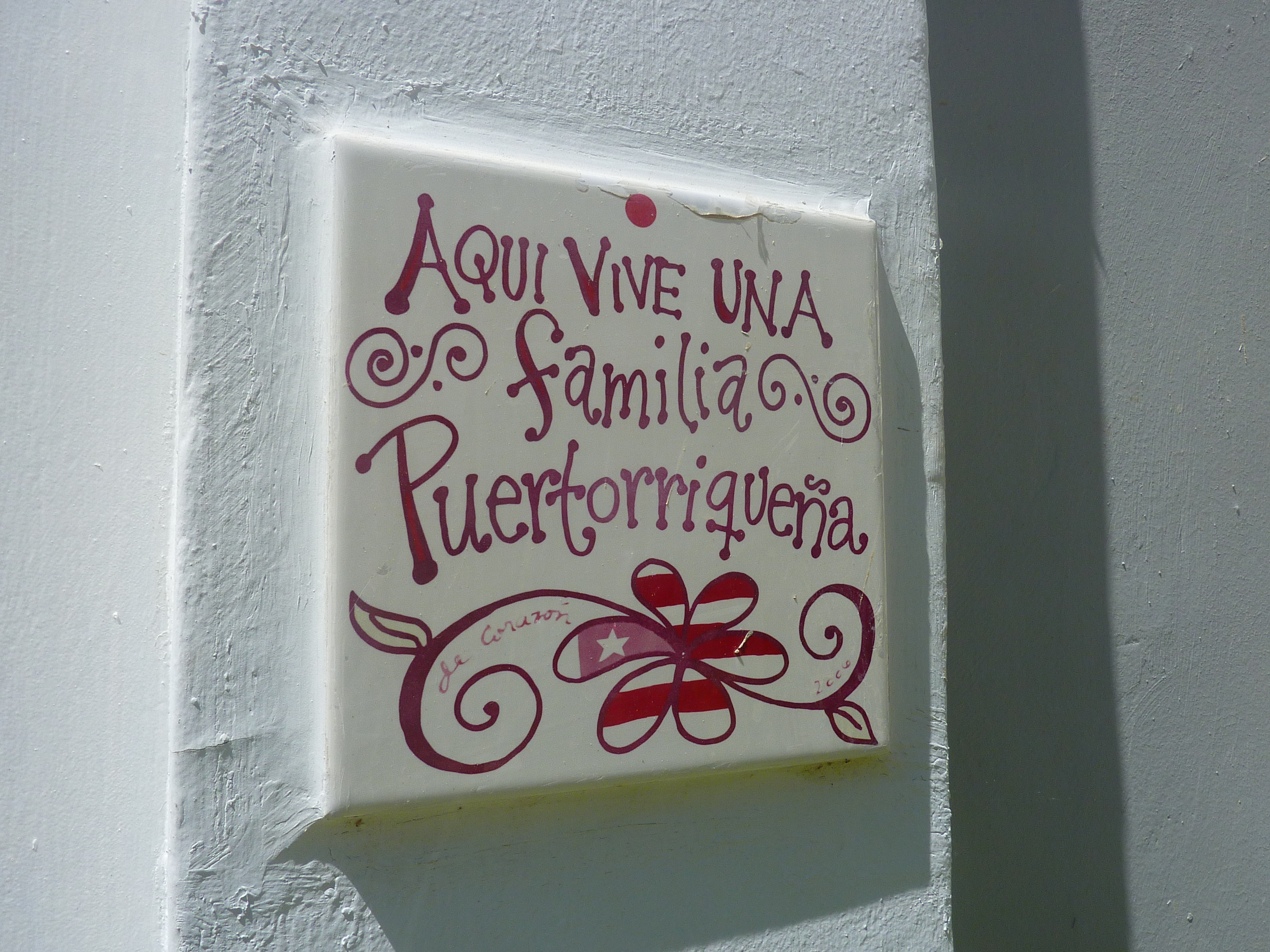
"A Puerto Rican family lives here" sign on a wall in San Juan

The Puerto Rico of today has come to form some of its own social customs, cultural matrix, historically rooted traditions, and its own unique pronunciation, vocabulary, and idiomatic expressions within the Spanish language, known as Puerto Rican Spanish. Even after the attempted assimilation of Puerto Rico into the United States in the early 20th century, the majority of the people of Puerto Rico feel pride in their Puerto Rican nationality, regardless of the individual's particular racial, ethnic, political, or economic background. Many Puerto Ricans are consciously aware of the rich contribution of all cultures represented on the island. This diversity can be seen in the everyday lifestyle of many Puerto Ricans such as the profound Latin, African, and Indigenous influences regarding food, music, dance, and architecture.

== Emigration ==
During the Spanish colonial period, there was significant migration from Puerto Rico to Santo Domingo, Cuba, the Virgin Islands, and Venezuela, and vice versa, because migration between neighboring colonies especially under the same European power, was common. Nearly all Puerto Ricans who migrated to these areas during these times, assimilated and intermixed with the local populations. In the early days of US rule, from 1900 to the 1940s, the Puerto Rican economy was small and undeveloped, it relied heavily on agriculture. At this time, Puerto Rican migration waves were mainly to Dominican Republic, the Virgin Islands, and US cities such as Boston, Philadelphia, Baltimore, Miami, New Orleans, and most importantly metropolitan area surrounding New York City and North Jersey. Over 5,000 Puerto Ricans migrated to Hawaii from 1900 to 1901. Puerto Rican migration to the US northeast started as early as the 1890s; however, it was a very, very small flow at the time. During the 1940s, Puerto Rican desire for independence slowly started to decline while desire for statehood and dependence on the US started rise, due to this more Puerto Ricans started to look at the US more favorably and take full advantage of their US citizenship, huge flows of Puerto Ricans started to arrive in the United States, particularly industrial cities in the Northeast and Midwest, coinciding with a strong decline in Puerto Ricans migrating to other countries and even other areas in the US like Baltimore, New Orleans, and Hawaii. From 1940 to 1960, the stateside Puerto Rican population rose from 69,967 to 892,513, the majority of which went to the New York metro area. For the bulk of the 1900s, New York City was the center of the Puerto Rican diaspora. However, since the start of the 2000s, the Puerto Rican population in the NYC area has declined and the total Puerto Rican population in the mainland United States has since spread out, with Florida (especially the Orlando area) being the most popular destination.

In the modern day, there are about 5.9 million Puerto Ricans in the US mainland. Large concentrations can be found in the Northeast region and in Florida, in the metropolitan areas of New York, Orlando, Philadelphia, Miami, Chicago, Tampa, and Boston, among others. Although over 95% of Puerto Ricans living outside of Puerto Rico live in the mainland United States, there is a significant and growing number of Puerto Ricans – mainly from Puerto Rico itself but also to a lesser degree from the 50 states – living in other countries. Puerto Rican populations in other countries are very small, not large enough to have dominance over certain neighborhoods and cities like in Florida and the US Northeast. Unsurprisingly, Puerto Rico's neighbors have the biggest Puerto Rican communities outside Puerto Rico and the US mainland, to the west Dominican Republic with as high as 34,000 Puerto Ricans according to some sources, and to the east US Virgin Islands with 7,759, 8.9% of the territory's population, second highest percentage of any US state or territory, after Puerto Rico (95.5%) and before Connecticut (8.0%). There are small numbers of Puerto Ricans in other countries like Canada, Spain, Mexico, United Kingdom, and other countries in Europe and the Caribbean/Latin America. Due to Puerto Rico being a US territory, the vast majority of Puerto Ricans leaving the island go to the mainland United States, comprising Puerto Ricans of all income brackets and lifestyles. However, majority of the small number of Puerto Ricans living outside of the United States, including outside of Puerto Rico and other territories, are usually financially well-off and entrepreneurial, owning homes and businesses in the countries they choose to settle in. Statistical counts of Puerto Rican populations in other countries usually only center on ethnic Puerto Ricans born in Puerto Rico. Other ethnic groups born in Puerto Rico who move away usually wouldn't be included in a Puerto Rican population count, especially if they have ancestry of at least one parent born in target country – for example people of Dominican, Cuban, or Mexican etc. ancestry born in Puerto Rico and later returning to their ancestral country – wouldn't be counted in a Puerto Rican population count, but likely rather counted as a "returning emigrant". Similarly, Puerto Ricans born in the mainland United States would be counted under an "American" statistic, so the Puerto Rican populations abroad may be slightly larger as some may be stateside-born and counted as "American" rather than "Puerto Rican" on local government statistics on immigrants.

== Language ==
Spanish and English are the official languages of the entire Commonwealth. A 1902 English-only language law was abolished on April 5, 1991. Then on January 28, 1993, the Legislative Assembly of Puerto Rico approved Law Number 1 again making Spanish and English the official languages of Puerto Rico. All official business of the U.S. District Court for the District of Puerto Rico is conducted in English. The official languages of the executive branch of government of Puerto Rico are Spanish and English, with Spanish being the primary language. English is the primary language of less than 10% of the population.

Puerto Rican Spanish is the dominant language of business, education and daily life on the island. The US Census Bureau's 2015 update provides the following: 94.1% of adults speak Spanish, 5.8% speak only English and little to no Spanish, 78.3% do not speak English "very well", 15.8% are fully bilingual in both English and Spanish, 0.1% speak other languages.

Public school instruction in Puerto Rico is conducted almost entirely in Spanish. There have been pilot programs in about a dozen of the over 1,400 public schools aimed at conducting instruction in English only. Objections from teaching staff are common, perhaps because many of them are not fully fluent in English. English is taught as a second language and is a compulsory subject from elementary levels to high school.

Puerto Rico is home to a sizeable deaf community; the actual numbers are unknown due to unavailable source data. A 1986 estimate places the Puerto Rican deaf population between 8,000 and 40,000. Due to ongoing colonization from the US mainland, the larger American Sign Language (ASL) is supplanting the local Puerto Rican Sign Language (PRSL, also known as LSPR: Lenguaje de Señas Puertorriqueño). Although assumed to be a dialect or variant of ASL, the degree of mutual intelligibility between Puerto Rican Sign Language is currently unknown, as is whether it is even a Francosign language like ASL. Indeed, there is a hesitancy amongst Puerto Rican Deaf to even mention LSPR after heavy-handed oralist education of English, Spanish, and Signed English. Today, there is much contact between ASL, PRSL, and Signed Spanish.

The Spanish of Puerto Rico has evolved into having many idiosyncrasies in vocabulary and syntax that differentiate it from the Spanish spoken elsewhere. While the Spanish spoken in all Iberian, Mediterranean and Atlantic Spanish Maritime Provinces was brought to the island over the centuries, the most profound regional influence on the Spanish spoken in Puerto Rico has been from that spoken in the present-day Canary Islands. The Spanish of Puerto Rico also includes occasional Taíno words, typically in the context of vegetation, natural phenomena or primitive musical instruments. Similarly, words attributed to primarily West African languages were adopted in the contexts of foods, music or dances.

== Religion ==
There are many religious beliefs represented in the island. Religious breakdown in Puerto Rico (as of 2006) is given in the table on the right.

Religions in Puerto Rico (2006)
Religion	Adherents	% of Population
Christian	3,752,544	97.00%
Non-religious/other	76,598	1.98%
Spiritist	27,080	0.70%
Muslim	5,029	0.13%
Hindu	3,482	0.09%
Jewish	2,708	0.07%
Buddhist	1,161	0.03%

The majority of Puerto Ricans in the island are Christians. Spiritists have a large secondary following. Muslims, Hindus, Jews, and Buddhists all have a small presence as well. Roman Catholicism has been the main Christian denomination among Puerto Ricans since the arrival of the Spanish in the 15th century, but the presence of Protestant, Mormon, Pentecostal, and Jehovah's Witnesses denominations has increased under U.S. sovereignty, making modern Puerto Rico an inter-denominational, multi-religious community. The Afro-Caribbean religion Santería is also practiced.

In 1998, a news report stated that "Puerto Rico [was] no longer predominantly Catholic". Pollster Pablo Ramos wrote that the population was 38% Roman Catholic, 28% Pentecostal, and 18% were members of independent churches. However, an Associated Press article in March 2014 stated that "more than 70 percent of [Puerto Ricans] identify themselves as Catholic". The CIA World Factbook reports that 85% of the population of Puerto Rico identifies as Roman Catholic, while 15% identify as Protestant and Other.

== Political and international status ==
Puerto Ricans became citizens of the United States as a result of the passage of the Jones–Shafroth Act of 1917. Since this law was the result of Congressional legislation, and not the result of an amendment to the United States Constitution, the current U.S. citizenship of Puerto Ricans can be revoked by Congress, as they are statutory citizens, not 14th Amendment citizens. The Jones Act established that Puerto Ricans born prior to 1899 were considered naturalized citizens of Puerto Rico, and anyone born after 1898 were U.S. citizens, unless the Puerto Rican expressed his/her intentions to remain a Spanish subject. Since 1948, it was decided by Congress that all Puerto Ricans, whether born within the United States or in Puerto Rico, were naturally born United States citizens.

Puerto Ricans and other U.S. citizens residing in Puerto Rico cannot vote in presidential elections as that is a right reserved by the U.S. Constitution to admitted states and the District of Columbia through the Electoral College system. Nevertheless, both the Democratic Party and Republican Party, while not fielding candidates for public office in Puerto Rico, provide the islands with state-sized voting delegations at their presidential nominating conventions. Delegate selection processes frequently have resulted in presidential primaries being held in Puerto Rico. U.S. citizens residing in Puerto Rico do not elect U.S. representatives or senators. However, Puerto Rico is represented in the House of Representatives by an elected representative commonly known as the Resident Commissioner, who has the same duties and obligations as a representative, with the exception of being able to cast votes on the final disposition of legislation on the House floor. The Resident Commissioner is elected by Puerto Ricans to a four-year term and does serve on congressional committee. Puerto Ricans residing in the U.S. states have all rights and privileges of other U.S. citizens living in the states.

As statutory U.S. citizens, Puerto Ricans born in Puerto Rico may enlist in the U.S. military and have been included in the compulsory draft when it has been in effect. Puerto Ricans have fully participated in all U.S. wars and military conflicts since 1898, including World War I, World War II, the Korean War, the Vietnam War, the Gulf War, the War in Afghanistan, and the Iraq War.

Since 2007, the Puerto Rico State Department has developed a protocol to issue certificates of Puerto Rican citizenship to Puerto Ricans. In order to be eligible, applicants must have been born in Puerto Rico; born outside of Puerto Rico to a Puerto Rican-born parent; or be an American citizen with at least one year residence in Puerto Rico. The citizenship is internationally recognized by Spain, which considers Puerto Rico to be an Ibero-American nation. Therefore, Puerto Rican citizens have the ability to apply for Spanish citizenship after only two years residency in Spain (instead of the standard 10 years).

Puerto Rican voters, despite not voting in the 2024 election for the President on the island, nevertheless were a surprisingly important political "hot potato" for both parties, due to the large number of Puerto Rican voters on the mainland.

=== Decolonization and status referendums ===
Since 1953, the UN has been considering the political status of Puerto Rico and how to assist it in achieving "independence" or "decolonization." In 1978, the Special Committee determined that a "colonial relationship" existed between the US and Puerto Rico.

The UN's Special Committee has referred often to Puerto Rico as a nation in its reports, because, internationally, the people of Puerto Rico are often considered to be a Caribbean nation with their own national identity. Most recently, in a June 2016 report, the Special Committee called for the United States to expedite the process to allow self-determination in Puerto Rico. More specifically, the group called on the United States to expedite a process that would allow the people of Puerto Rico to exercise fully their right to self-determination and independence. ... allow the Puerto Rican people to take decisions in a sovereign manner, and to address their urgent economic and social needs, including unemployment, marginalization, insolvency and poverty".

Puerto Rico has held four referendums to determine whether to retain its status as a territory or to switch to some other status such as statehood. The fourth, the Puerto Rican status referendum, 2012 occurred on November 6, 2012. The result a 54% majority of the ballots cast against the continuation of the island's territorial political status, and in favor of a new status. Of votes for new status, a 61.1% majority chose statehood. This was by far the most successful referendum for statehood advocates. In all earlier referendums, votes for statehood were matched almost equally by votes for remaining an American territory, with the remainder for independence. Support for U.S. statehood has risen in each successive popular referendum.

The fifth Puerto Rican status referendum of 2017, was held on June 11, 2017, and offered three options: "Statehood", "Independence/Free Association", and "Current Territorial Status." With 23% of registered voters casting ballots, 97% voted for statehood. Benefits of statehood would include an additional $10 billion per year in federal funds, the right to vote in presidential elections, higher Social Security and Medicare benefits, and a right for its government agencies and municipalities to file for bankruptcy. The latter is currently prohibited.

Even with the Puerto Ricans' vote for statehood, action by the United States Congress would be necessary to implement changes to the status of Puerto Rico under the Territorial Clause of the United States Constitution.

== See also ==
- Criollo people
- Demographics of Puerto Rico
- Hispanics
- History of Puerto Ricans
- History of Puerto Rico
- History of women in Puerto Rico
- List of Puerto Rican Presidential Citizens Medal recipients
- List of Puerto Rican Presidential Medal of Freedom recipients
- List of Puerto Ricans
- List of Stateside Puerto Ricans
- Military history of Puerto Rico
- Nuyoricans
- Puerto Rican citizenship and nationality
- Puerto Rican migration to New York
- Puerto Rican status referendum, 2017
- Puerto Ricans in the United States
