= Liset Rodríguez Achata =

Peruvian chemist

- Born: Cusco, Peru
- Education: National University of Saint Anthony the Abbot in Cuzco (UNSAAC) National University of Educación Enrique Guzmán y Valle
- Known for: Chemist and professor, specialist in environmental and sustainable education.
- Awards: "Challenges, Opportunities, and Perspectives of Women in Science" "H2O Research from 2021"

Liset Rodríguez Achata (Cusco, 1978) is a chemist and professor, specializing in environmental management and sustainable development. Her research has focused on sustainability, actively participating in projects on the use of non-polluting technologies, such as the development of eco-friendly plastics and studies related to water quality.

== Biography ==
Liset Rodríguez Achata was born in 1978 in the San Blas neighborhood of Cusco, Peru. She pursued a degree in Chemistry at the National University of San Antonio Abad of Cusco (UNSAAC).

In 2003, she began her academic career as a teaching assistant at the National Amazonian University of Madre de Dios (UNAMAD). She later became a professor at the same institution, focusing on environmental research and sustainable development in the Amazon region. Her work includes studies on non-polluting technologies, eco-friendly materials, and water quality.

=== Career ===
Rodríguez is a registered researcher in the National Registry of Researchers of the National Council for Science, Technology, and Innovation (CONCYTEC). She is a member of the coordination team of the UNAMD Scientific Collection of Ichthyofauna and has served as a consultant for the Ministry of Energy and Mines, contributing to the development of the Regional Energy Balance.

In the institutional sphere, she served as head of the Environmental Laboratory and Director of the Office of Quality Control and Laboratory Management at the National Amazonian University of Madre de Dios. She is currently the editor-in-chief of the Amazonian Biodiversity Journal, published by the same academic institution. In the field of education, she advocates for environmental education in higher academic training.

== Research ==
In 2022, she collaborated with the National University of Engineering (UNI) in the design of a clean and high-efficiency technology system for gold extraction and remediation of environmental liabilities without the use of mercury. She also worked with the University of Engineering and Technology (UTEC) in scaling up waste-processing technologies from artisanal gold mining to support sustainable mine closure. That same year, she published in the Amazonian Biodiversity Journal of the Amazonian University of Madre de Dios (UNAMAD) an article on 'UNAMAD's scientific output available to the academic and scientific community' and another on the 'Environmental assessment of water quality in ponds formed by non-metallic mining extraction activities in Madre de Dios'.

In 2021, she advised a project focused on the assessment of surface water quality in urban areas of the Peruvian Amazon. In 2019, she collaborated with Inkaterra on the isolation, barcoding, and production technology of wild Amazonian fungi for their introduction into the gastronomic market in Tambopata.

In 2018, she worked with the Pontifical Catholic University of Peru on the production of graphene from Amazonian forest waste, and in 2019, on the development of eco-friendly plastics derived from biopolymers sourced from agroforestry residues.

In 2018, she was part of the team that presented the project "Recovery Systems for Areas Degraded by Alluvial Gold Mining Using Local Plant Species with Economic and Ecosystem Potential in Madre de Dios," funded by Peruvian Amazon Research Institute (IIAP–MINAM). In 2019, she collaborated with Dr. Omar Troncoso from the Pontifical Catholic University of Peru in the production of eco-friendly plastics using biopolymers derived from agroforestry waste.

In 2016, she collaborated with José Carlos Mariátegui University on the generation of renewable energy from by-products of cattle and pig slaughtering through a pilot biodigester

== Awards and recognitions ==
On March 8, 2023, Rodríguez was recognized in the discussion panel "Challenges, Opportunities, and Perspectives for Women in Science" for her contributions to environmental research in the Amazon.

On December 12, 2022, she was one of the researchers honored in the Fifth Edition of the National Water Culture Award, "H_{2}O Research 2021," granted by the National Water Authority (ANA) through Resolution No. 0403-2022-ANA.
