= Ian McKay (disambiguation) =

Ian McKay (1953–1982) was a British soldier who won a posthumous Victoria Cross in the Falklands War.

Ian McKay may also refer to:

- Ian McKay (footballer) (1923–2010), Australian rules footballer with North Adelaide
- Ian McKay (writer) (born 1962), English art critic, writer, and academic
- Ian McKay (historian) (born 1953), Canadian historian
- Ian McKay (judge) (1929–2014), New Zealand judge
- Ian G. McKay (born 1963), Canadian director of the Liberal Party of Canada

== See also ==
- Ian MacKaye (born 1962), American rock musician
- Ian Mackay (disambiguation)
- Iain Mackay (disambiguation)
