= Olaechea =

Olaechea is a surname. Notable people with the surname include:

- Jorge Olaechea (born 1956), Peruvian footballer
- Marcelino Olaechea (1889-1972), Spanish Roman Catholic bishop
- Max González Olaechea (1867–1946), Peruvian medical doctor, clinician, and university professor
- Pedro Olaechea (born 1954), Peruvian economist, vintner businessman, and politician
