= Gracias al Sacar =

Spanish colonial legal mechanism

Gracias al Sacar (literally "Thanks for Removal") was a legal mechanism instituted by the Spanish Crown in 1795 that allowed colonial subjects of mixed ancestry to obtain official documentation elevating their racial classification.

== Origins and legal framework ==
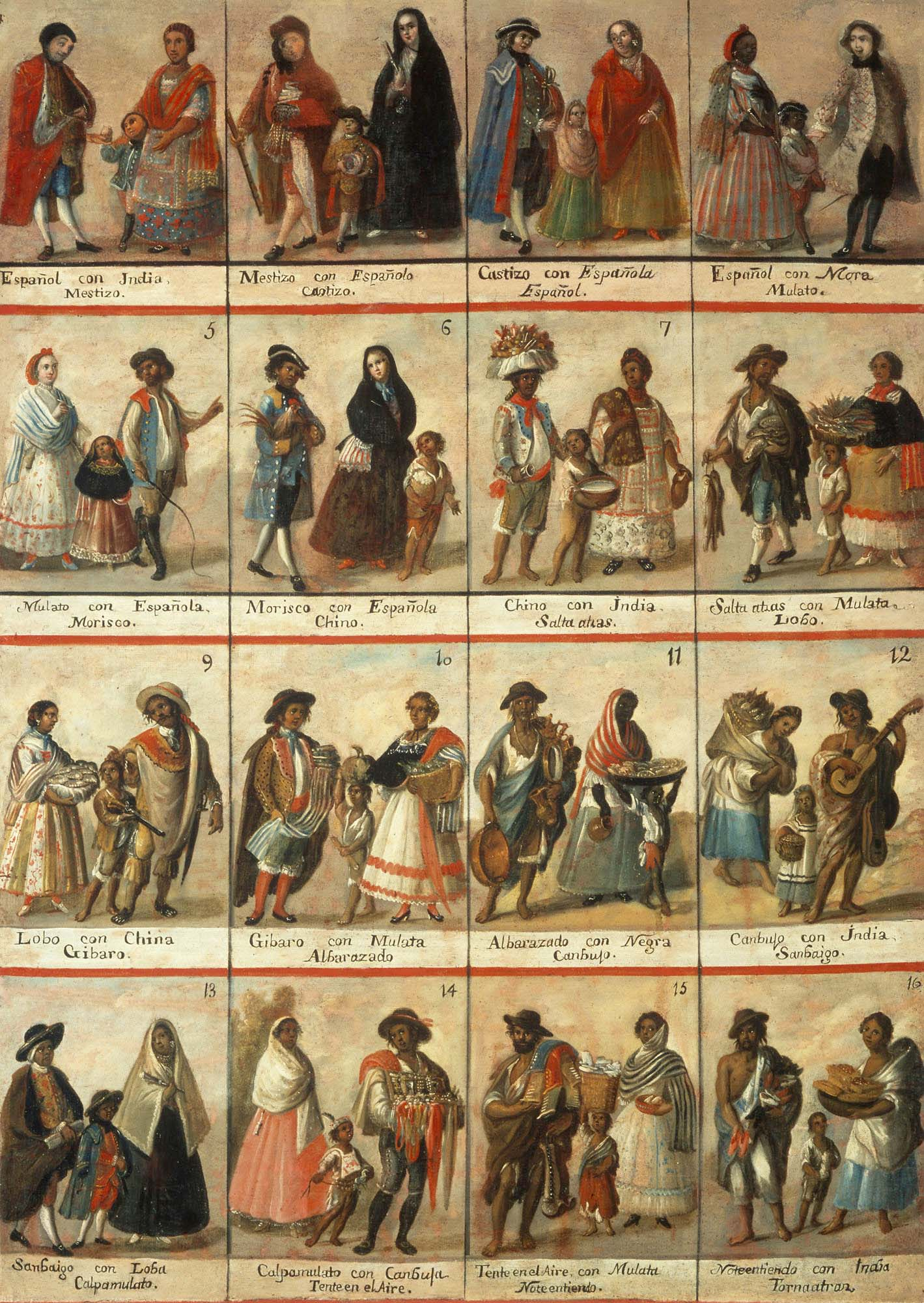
An oil painting describing the different casts within the caste system present in New Spain.

According to the Diccionario Panhispánico del Español Jurídico (2023), gracias al sacar was classified under "administrative procedure."

Historian Ann Twinam argues that the ideology behind what she terms "purchasing whiteness" emerged during the Bourbon Reforms, when the Spanish Crown sought to raise revenue and reinforce loyalty among the wealthy mixed-race population. With the support of José de Cistué y Coll, Crown Attorney on the Council of the Indies, the whitening petitions were formalized and disseminated across various Spanish colonies. Some applicants reportedly received their grants in secret, possibly to avoid public backlash or social consequences. Once approved, petitioners were legally reclassified as español (Spaniard), granting them access to social and legal privileges tied to “whiteness.”

== Social and economic implications ==
According to legal scholar Estelle Lau, access to legal whiteness under the Gracias al Sacar process conferred benefits such as reduced taxation, improved access to education, and expanded civil and religious rights.

Access to gracias al sacar was typically limited to individuals who already possessed a certain level of wealth and social standing. For example, affluent free people of mixed ancestry, such as some mulatos, could apply for legal recognition as españoles, whereas impoverished or enslaved individuals were generally excluded. Some petitions were granted in secrecy, possibly to avoid public controversy or backlash from elites concerned about maintaining clear distinctions of status and lineage.

== Case studies and regional examples ==
The implementation of gracias al sacar varied across different regions of the Spanish Empire, including parts of what is now Latin America and the United States.

=== José Ponciano de Ayarza ===
José Ponciano de Ayarza, a wealthy man of mixed African and European ancestry, submitted a petition to attend the University of Santo Tomás in Santa Fe de Bogotá to pursue a degree in philosophy. At the time, individuals classified as people of color were generally excluded from such institutions. Ayarza’s petition emphasized his loyalty to the Crown, good character, and education. However, archival evidence suggests that financial payment played a decisive role in the Crown’s approval of his request for whiteness status through gracias al sacar.

=== José de Cistué y Coll ===
José de Cistué y Coll served as Crown Attorney on the Council of the Indies from 1778 to 1802. He is credited with formalizing the legal mechanism of gracias al sacar, standardizing its procedures, and drafting template documents that were used throughout the empire.

=== D. Jose Manuel Valdes ===
José Manuel Valdés was a Peruvian physician of African descent who received a decree of gracias al sacar in 1806. The decree allowed him to pursue formal education and a professional career in medicine, which would otherwise have been restricted due to his racial classification.

=== Afro-Tejanos in Texas ===
In Spanish Texas, the policy of gracias al sacar was occasionally applied to Afro-descendant populations.

=== Notaries of color ===
In colonial Panama, certificates of whiteness were occasionally granted to notaries and other legal professionals of African descent.[In colonial Panama, certificates of whiteness were occasionally granted to notaries and other legal professionals of African descent. These cases highlight how exceptions to limpieza de sangre (purity of blood) statutes could be negotiated through legal petitions, thereby reshaping access to economic and legal privileges under Spanish rule.
