= Ian Mackay =

Ian Mackay or MacKay may refer to:

- Ian Mackay (field hockey) (born 1938), Olympic hockey player
- Ian Mackay (footballer) (born 1986), Spanish professional footballer
- Ian MacKay (born 1994), Canadian lacrosse player
- Ian Reay Mackay (born 1922), Australian immunologist
- Ian Mackay (rugby league) (born 1952), Australian rugby league player

== See also ==
- Ian McKay (disambiguation)
- Iain Mackay (disambiguation)
- Ian MacKaye (born 1962), American singer, musician and producer
