= Maria Antonieta Quispe Ricalde =

Peruvian biologist

- Born: 1971 (age 54–55); Cusco, Peru
- Education: National University of Saint Anthony the Abbot in Cuzco
- Scientific career
- Fields: Biochemistry, genetics, microorganism biotechnology and parasitic immunology
- Workplaces: National University of Saint Anthony the Abbot in Cuzco

Maria Antonieta Quispe Ricalde (born 1971) is a Peruvian biologist from National University of Saint Anthony the Abbot in Cuzco (UNSAAC), in Cusco, Peru. In Spain, she has participated in research projects about detection and prevention of pathogenic organisms such as bacterias Yersinia and Bartonella, and also has studied halophilic bacteria that can combat mining pollution while searching for a vaccine for uta (leishmaniasis) at the University of La Laguna (ULL).

She is a professor and researcher at UNSAAC, directing the research lines of biochemistry, genetics and microorganism biotechnology.

== Early life and education ==
Quispe was born in San Sebastián, a district of the province of Cusco in Peru's Cusco region. Her father, Bonifacio Quispe Cusi, was a deputy during the second government of Fernando Belaúnde Terry. She studied at the Santa Ana Cusco private educational school.

In 1997, she graduated with a degree in biology from UNSAAC in Cuzco. She received her master's degree in biochemistry and molecular biology from Cayetano Heredia University. In 1999, she migrated to Spain to do her doctoral thesis at ULL.

== Career ==
From 1999 to 2005, Quispe completed her doctorate in molecular parasitology, receiving the honor of cum laude at ULL, Spain.

In 2010, she began her journey to find a vaccine for uta (cutaneous leishmaniasis), she conducted research on candidate immunomodulatory molecules for the uta vaccine at ULL. In 2014, she began studying halophilic bacteria that can degrade metal, thus eradicating mining pollution that affects soil and water, and also investigated the metabolism of arsenic to find bacteria that can clean up the environment.

In 2018, she was invited by researcher Pilar Foronda Rodríguez to do a stay at the Institute of Tropical Diseases and Public Health of the Canary Islands at ULL in Spain. Both worked on projects on the detection and prevention of zoonotic pathogens such as Angiostrongylus cantonensis, yersinia and bartonella. In the same year, she received funding to continue researching leishmaniasis.

She continued her training at ULL and University of Granada (Spain), Pontifical Catholic University of Peru (Peru), Autonomous Metropolitan University (Mexico), etc. She speaks three languages, including English and Italian.

She is a teacher and researcher, directing the research lines of biochemistry, genetics and microorganism biotechnology. She is an associate editor at UNSAAC's Environment, Behavior and Society Journal.

== Works ==
Since 1999, Quispe has participated in many projects research in and has publicated articles in various scientific journals. She is a RENACYT researcher level III.

She participated in the elaboration of the second chapter, "Los alcaloides del tarwi", with Omar Santiago Pillaca Pullo from Amparo Iris Zavaleta's book Lupinus mutabilis (tarwi), Leguminosa andina con gran potencial industrial.

== Awards and honors ==
- Distinguished visitor to the National University of Altiplano Puno.
- "Excellence in Research" Award for her performance as a teacher/researcher at UNSAAC.
- In 2017, she won "Best research paper" award presented at the VII Research Week UNSAAC.
- In 2018, she was one of the 11 finalists for the National Award L'Oréal-UNESCO "For Women in Science".

== See also ==
- Leishmaniasis vaccine
- Leishmaniasis
- Arsenic
- Microbiology
