= Iain Mackay =

Iain Mackay may refer to:

- Iain Mackay (field hockey), British field hockey player
- Iain MacKay (politician), Canadian politician
- Iain Mackay (photographer) from Jorge Aliaga Cacho

== See also ==
- Iain Mackay-Dick, major-general
- Ian Mackay (disambiguation)
