= Alicia Delgado =

- Also known as: La Princesa del Folklore
- Born: Alicia Luisa Delgado Hilario; May 6, 1959
- Origin: Peru, Cajatambo
- Died: June 24, 2009 (aged 50)
- Genres: Folklore, Huayno
- Occupation: Singer
- Instrument: Vocals
- Years active: 1975-2009
- Formerly of: Flor Pucarina, Pastorita Huaracina, Princesita de Yungay
- Website: http://aliciadelgado.com/

Alicia Luisa Delgado Hilario, better known as Alicia Delgado (May 6, 1959 - June 24, 2009), was a Peruvian folk singer who is credited by some with establishing the harp in the realm of música folklórica.

== Biography ==
Alicia Delgado was born to Zenobio Delgado and Santa Hilario in the town of Taucur, in the province of Oyón, Lima, on May 6, 1959.

She began her career with the support of the well-known artist Totita Cruz, who introduced her to the celebrated radio DJ and talent searcher Eladio Obispo Ureta, on whose program "Así Canta Mi Pueblo" she sang in front of a microphone for the first time, accompanied by the late master Pelayo Vallejo. On February 11, 1975, at the age of 16, Delgado made her first recording under the direction of artist and producer Ángel Damaso, which launcher her first hit song: "Un Fracaso en la Vida."

Through most of her career, she dedicated herself to promoting Andean folk music through South America, becoming a musical star in both her native Peru and in neighboring countries such as Chile, Ecuador, and Bolivia, through which she would become known as the "Princesa del Folklore Peruano," or the Peruvian Princess of Folk Music. In her career, she sang more than a thousand Peruvian songs.

Delgado married Rubén Retuerto and had a son named Junior Retuerto Delgado. As she became successful, she spent various years in the United States. In her later years, she had a very close relationship with Abencia Meza, another traditional Peruvian singer. The two quietly owned an apartment together, and it was widely acknowledged, both by Meza and the general public, that their relationship was intimate, though Delgado never publicly confirmed on that their relationship was more than one of friendship.

On June 25, 2009, Delgado's body was found in her home in the Santiago de Surco district of Lima. Initial investigations determined the cause of death to be multiple stab wounds. The primary suspect was a man named Pedro César Mamanchura Antúnez, Delgado's driver who disappeared after her death, though Meza was thought to be ultimately responsible. When he was found, Mamanchura said that Meza had paid him to kill Delgado, but this testimony was ruled inadmissible because Mamanchura's lawyer wasn't present. His subsequent interviews with police exculpated Meza.

Finally, Meza was sentenced with 30 years imprisoned for the murder of Delgado.

== Selected songs ==
- "Cáncer de Amor"
- "Triste Desengaño"
- "Mi Escritorio"
- "El Cielo y Tu"
- "Quien toma mas que yo"
- "Quillabambino"
- "Piedra Resbalosa"
- "Rio Churín"
- "Huracancito"

== Discography ==
- Alicia Delgado
- Con Ustedes...
- Nueva Vida
- La Genuina de la Canción Peruana
- La Madame del Huayno
- La Princesa del Huayna Cajatambino
- Con El Caballero del Arpa: Eduardo Delgado
- Concierto en Público con la Eterna Princesa
- Del Perú Para El Mundo
- Nuevamente La Única
- La Princesa del Folklore Peruano
- Toda Una Vida Cantándole al Perú y al Mundo
- Adiós, Adiós, Mi Público Lindo
