= Ernesto Pinto-Bazurco =

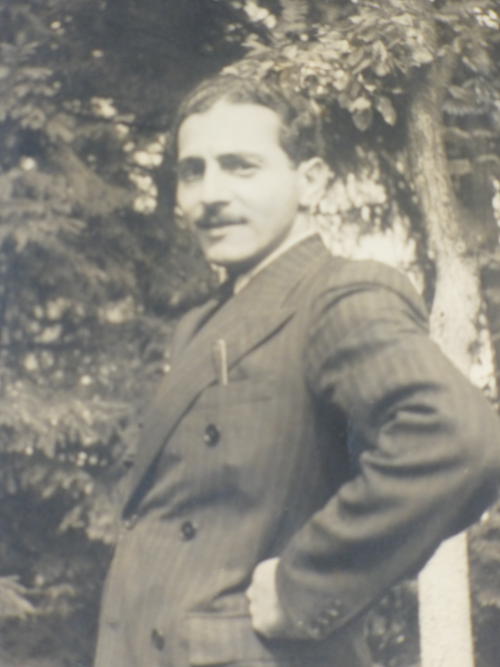
Ernesto Pinto-Bazurco

Ernesto Pinto-Bazurco was a Peruvian doctor. Born in Bellavista (El Callao, Peru) on 28 September 1913. During the Second World War he was assigned by the Swiss consulate to oversee the interests of Peruvian citizens living in Munich, Germany. During that time Ernesto Pinto-Bazurco issued visas that allowed some Jewish families to leave Germany. His son is diplomat Ernesto Pinto Bazurco Rittler.

== Biography ==
Ernesto Pinto-Bazurco was born on 28 September 1913 to Moises Pinto-Bazurco and Rosa, née Alcalde. Moises Pinto-Bazurco was a master in mathematics and an officer in the Peruvian navy. Rosa Alcalde was a founder of a transport passenger business in Lima.

In 1934 Ernesto Pinto-Bazurco travelled to Germany, contracted by the pharmaceutical company Bayer to study medicine. Pinto-Bazurco participated in various activities at the Casa Peru in Munich, which was a Multi-Cultural centre frequented by mainly Peruvians, Latin Americans and locals to the region of Bavaria, Germany.

That is where Pinto-Bazurco met his future wife Hildegard Rittler, native of Rosenheim, Bavaria, with whom he had 3 children: Rosa, born in 1942; Oscar Aurelio, born in 1945 and Ernesto, born in 1946.

== World War II ==
At the start of World War II many Latin-Americans immigrants in Germany fled to other countries. Ernesto Pinto-Bazurco decided to stay in Munich, serving gratitude to the country that allowed him to study medicine and realizing that during war times the demand for doctors would be high.

During the first years of World War II Pinto-Bazurco worked as a doctor in a Munich hospital (Allgemeines Krankenhaus). The Nazi regime denied his 3 marriage attempts to Hildegard Rittler suggesting that it wasn’t acceptable that German women would marry a Peruvian where they were so many German men with whom she could marry.

In early 1942, after the Japanese attack on Pearl Harbor, Peru broke its relations with countries under the Axis alliance and withdrew its diplomats from Germany. The Peruvian consulate in Munich was transferred to Switzerland.

On 17 February, Ernesto Pinto-Bazurco was arrested by the Gestapo on the accusations of spying in the favour of the allies, on the grounds that his father was a Navy officer for a nation that was in opposition to the Nazi regime and the fact that he was one of a few Peruvians that stayed after the war had started. He was first imprisoned in the Munich Police station and then he was transferred to a fort in the city of Laufen very close to the Austrian border. He was liberated on 14 May of the same year without any arrest charges.

== Swiss Consulate Post ==
As soon as Peruvians relations broke with Germany, the Swiss Confederation assumed representation of Peru in Germany. The Swiss consulate in Germany assigned Ernesto Pinto-Bazurco to represent the interests of Peruvian citizens living in Munich.

Under these circumstances, Pinto-Bazurco is wanted by some Jewish families who were in hiding and who asked Pinto-Bazurco for help to escape Nazi persecution. When he asked one of these Jewish families (they were escaping to Argentina) why they sought his help, they told him that the surname Pinto is of Sephardic Jewish origin.

Pinto-Bazurco granted the necessary documentation without asking for any payment or benefit in return. Furthermore, Ernesto Pinto-Bazurco took care of some Jewish families, who dared not go to public hospitals for fear of being arrested by the Nazis.

When the Second World War ended, the Peruvian ship Rimac repatriated some Peruvians who had stayed during the war. Among them was the Pinto-Bazurco family. In Peru, Hildegard Rittler carried out peaceful activities and promoted the positives that German culture had to offer, earning her the German "Cross of Merit". Hildegard Rittler wrote her testimonial about those years lived with Ernesto Pinto-Bazurco in the novels "Angels in Hell" and "When love conquers war".
