= Pamela Rodríguez =

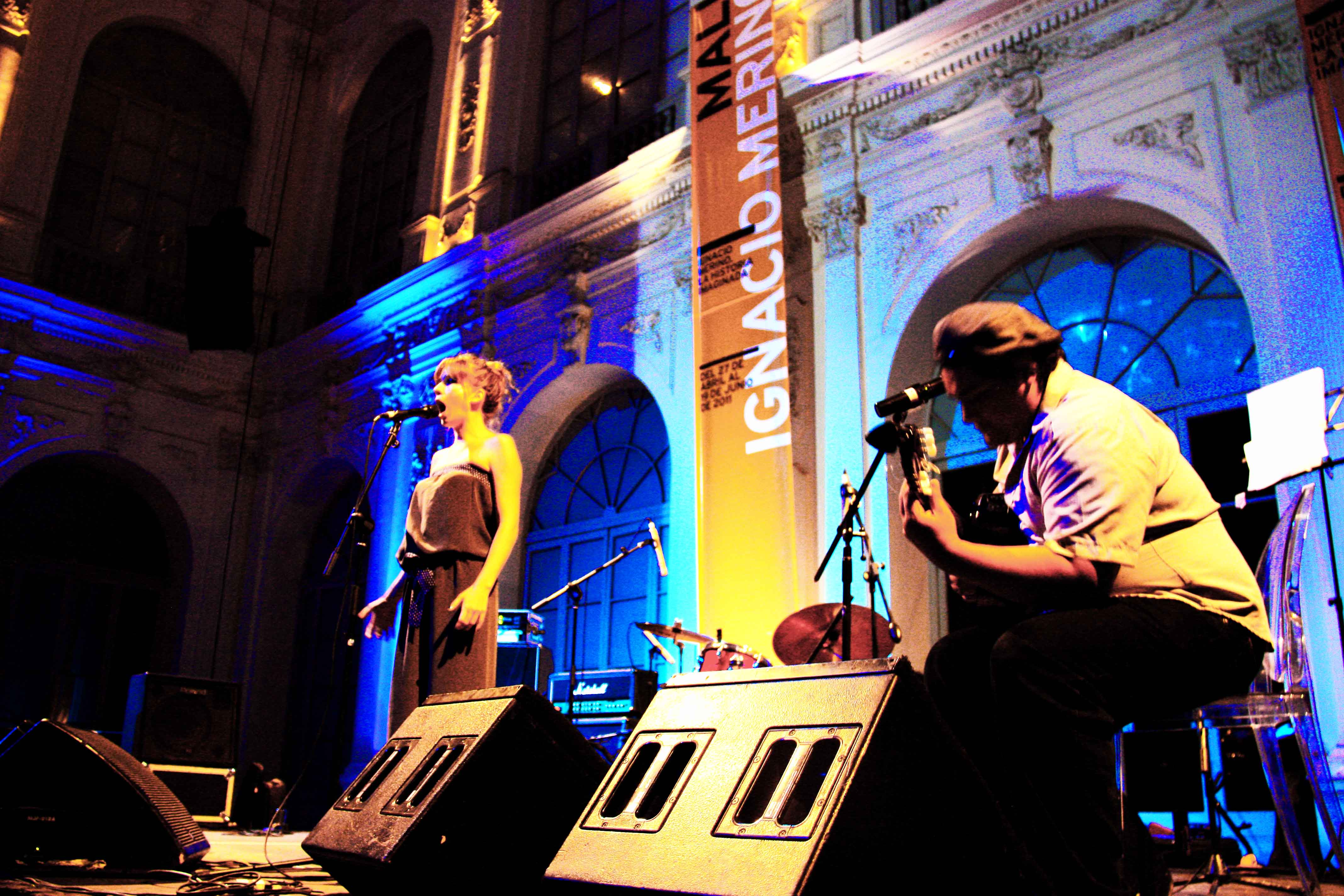
- At the Lima Art Museum in 2011
- Born: Pamela Rodríguez-Arnaiz Amianto; 12 May 1983 (age 43); Lima, Peru
- Education: University of North Texas
- Occupation: Singer
- Years active: 2005–present
- Spouse: Raúl Baltar Estévez
- Musical career
- Genres: Alternative pop, art rock, Peruvian rock, indie pop
- Label: Mamacha Productions

Pamela Rodríguez-Arnaiz Amianto (born 12 May 1983) is a Peruvian singer, a two-time Latin Grammy nominee. Her musical approach explores diverse genres such as pop, art rock, contemporary Peruvian music, and jazz. Her songs deal with social issues, the freedom of the human being and of women, and intimate themes.

== Personal life ==
Pamela Rodríguez was born in Lima, Peru. She is a descendant of diverse cultures: one mestizo grandfather (the son of a Spaniard and an indigenous Peruvian) with a Neapolitan grandmother, and one Italian grandfather with a Bolivian-English grandmother.

She has written poems, played the piano, and painted since she was 9 years old. She has kept records of her creations since that time.

She lived in Canada during two years of her childhood, where she sang in several local choirs.

When she returned to Lima with her family, she studied music and art. At age 14, thanks to her father (a musician and producer), she started recording in studios. Later she had private lessons in singing with Mariela Monzón and music with Pelo Madueño.

She studied music and ethnomusicology for four years at the University of North Texas. Pamela has continued to study with teachers in various subjects, and also as an autodidact.

Rodríguez is married to the Spanish economist and writer Raúl Baltar Estévez, with whom she has a daughter.

== Artistic career ==
Perú Blue, her first album, was released in 2005, a mixture of university jazz and Peruvian music. For that record, she was nominated for the Latin Grammy in 2006, as Best New Artist.

Next she launched En la orilla with producer Greg Landau, signifying a new step in her Peruvian-contemporary exploration. The album's songs include a celebration (where a woman escapes a macho flirt), a zamacueca with rap in Quechua, and a Landó performed by Peruvian musicians along with hip hop drummer Josh Jones (who had formerly worked with Tupac Shakur).

In the second half of 2011, Pamela Rodríguez released her album Reconocer in Peru. Its music, dressed with vintage and indie pop sounds, was produced in New York by David Little and engineers Ryan West, Ryan Kelly, and Dave Kutch.

For this production she was nominated for the Latin Grammy for Best Contemporary Pop Album.

== Discography ==
- Perú Blue (2005)
- En la orilla (2007)
- Reconocer (2011)
- Pamela Rodríguez y FFAA (2017)

== Awards and nominations ==
Year	Nominated work	Award	Category	Result
2006		7th Latin Grammy Awards	Best New Artist	Nominated
2011	"Ligera Love"	El Comercio Luces Awards	Song of the Year	Nominated
2011		El Comercio Luces Awards	Artist of the Year	Nominated
2012	Reconocer	13th Latin Grammy Awards	Best Contemporary Pop Album	Nominated
