= Graciela Fernández-Baca =

Peruvian economist and politician (1933–2020)

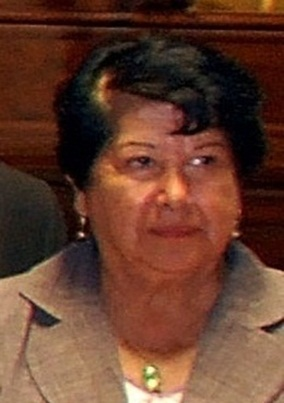
Image of Graciela Fernández-Baca

Hilda Graciela Fernández-Baca Calderón (1933–2020) was a Peruvian economist and politician who held a number of important positions in her country's public administrations, heading the National Institute of Statistics and Informatics from 1980 to 1987. Internationally, she was president of the Council for UNESCO's Information for All Programme and was a member of the board of auditors of the Organization of American States. From 1995 to 2000, she was a Member of the Peruvian Congress representing the Union for Peru.

== Biography ==
Born in Cuzco on 15 March 1933, Graciela Fernández-Baca Calderón was the daughter of Jenaro Fernández-Baca Cosio and his wife Marie Luisa née Calderón, both schoolteachers. She was one of the family's ten children. She married the agricultural engineer Américo Valdez Marin with whom she had four children. Fernández-Baca studied economics at the National University of Saint Anthony the Abbot in Cuzco. She went on to take post-graduate courses in economics and statistics at the Chapingo Autonomous University Mexico and in economic and financial statistics at the University of Chile .

For 26 years, Fernández-Baca served her country as a government official in statistics, taxation and information technology. From 1967 she worked in the taxation field as an advisor to the National Superintendent of Contributions. She developed the national taxpayers registry which was applied from 1968 to 1993. In parallel, she was an advisor in information technology in connection with the data processing centre of the Ministry of the Economy and Finance. Her most important work was in statistics where key positions included Head of the National Statistical System and of the National Institute of Statistics and Censuses (1980–1987).

From 1995 to 2000, she was a Member of the Peruvian Congress representing the Union for Peru.

Fernández-Baca died in Lima on 6 January 2020.
