= Amanda Portales =

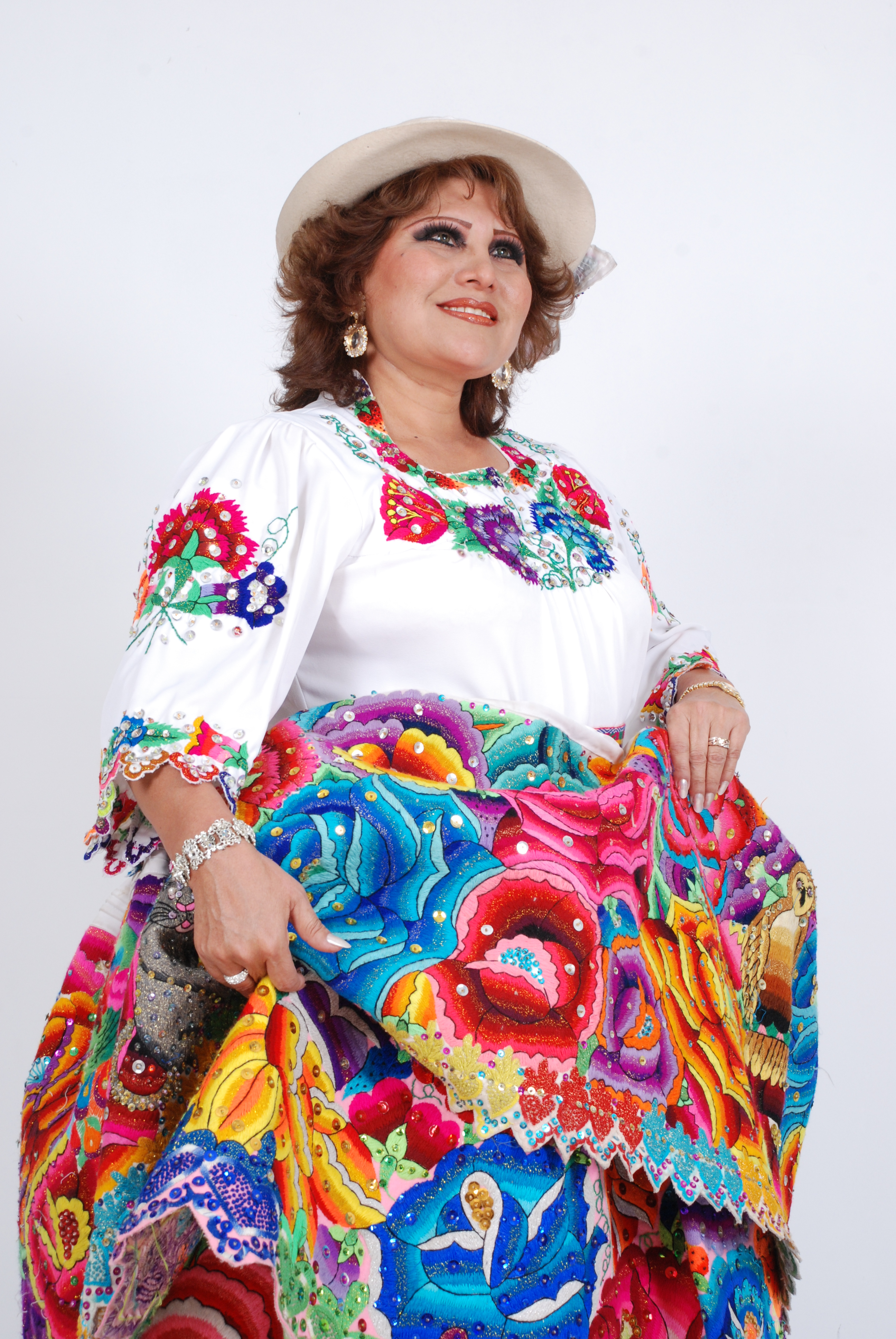
Amanda Portales

Amanda Portales Sotelo is a Peruvian singer, author, composer, and performer of Peruvian folklore, with more than 50 years of artistic experience of the Peruvian Andean culture.

== Biography ==
Her mother is Irene del Centro, known as the Dama Elegante of Folklore. She is an author and composer from Yauyos. Her father, Lucio Portales was from Huánuco and was a violinist and orchestra director. All her siblings are performers. Amanda Portales says she was almost born onstage. This is because her mother, director of the folklore company Juan Huquequeña, had to replace an absent dancer when her pregnancy was well advanced. While she was acting onstage, labor started.

== Career ==
Throughout her more than 50 years of career, Amanda Portales has acquired several different names, for example: Cápac Tika singing from Cusco, Flor Collavina singing music from Puno, Flor Amanda, Amanda del Mantaro or Amanda de los Andes singing the folklore of the Center of Peru. Finally, Amanda Portales, which is her artistic name. "La Novia del Perú", was a nickname created by Antonio Muñoz Monge in 1984.

In 2006 she was recognized by the Peruvian government with the Order of Merit for Distinguished Services in the Degree of Commander for being a recognized interpreter of Peruvian folklore and culture.

Portales has visited Korea, Greece, Hungary, Russia, Spain, Sweden, France, Italy, Belgium, Bolivia, Brazil, Chile, Venezuela, Argentina, the United States, Costa Rica, and Canada.

== Records ==
=== IEMPSA record label ===
- 1988 "Rosa Hermosa" (Long Play)
- 1989 "Digan lo que digan" (Long Play)
- 1990 "Bodas de Plata" (Long Play)
- 1992 "La Novia del Perú" (CD)
- 1994 "Viva la Vida" (CD)
- 1995 "Bodas de Perla" (CD)
- 1996 "Siempre Primera" (CD)

=== Mundo Music record label ===
- 2000 "El Quinto de Oro" Vol. I (CD)
- 2000 "El Quinto de Oro" Vol. II (CD)

=== Mundo Producciones Record Label ===
- 2005 "Bodas de Rubí" Vol. I (CD)
- 2005 "Bodas de Rubí" Vol. II (CD)
- 2007 "Sietes lindas canciones" (CD)

=== Fiesta Andina Producciones Record Label ===
- 2010 "Bodas de Zafiro" Vol. I (CD)
- 2010 "Bodas de Zafiro" Vol. II (CD)
- 2012 "Tradición Wanka" Vol. I y II (CD)
- 2014 "Primero lo Nuestro" (CD)
- 2015 "Amanda Amando" (CD)

== Films ==
- 2006 Noche de Ensueño
- 2007 La Novia del Perú
- 2010 Bodas de Zafiro
- 2016 Bodas de Oro
