= Yolanda Coco Ferraro =

Peruvian activist and politician (1909–2019)

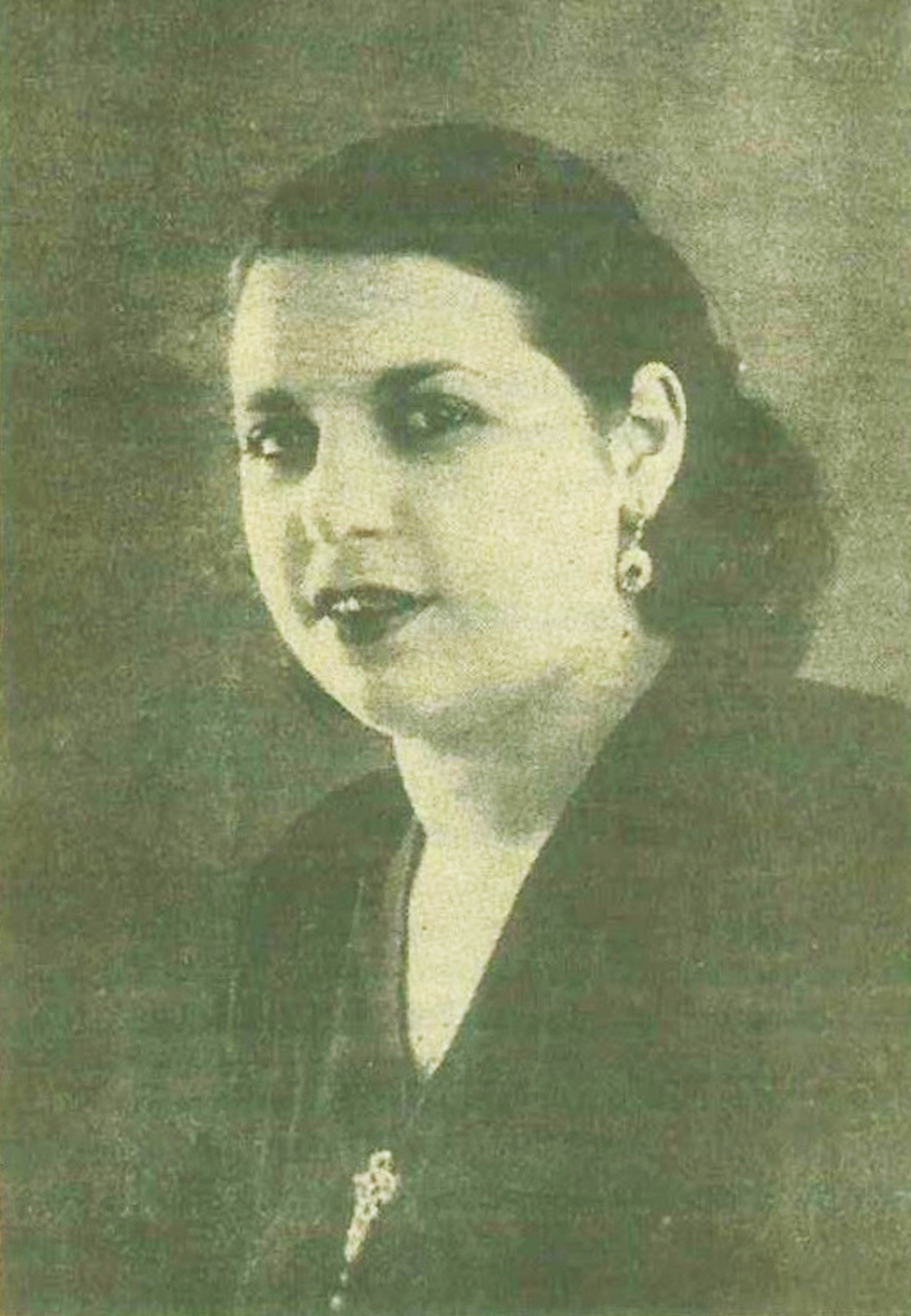

Personal details
- Born: 30 June 1909 Callao, Peru
- Died: 21 February 2019 (aged 109)
- Party: Revolutionary Union

Yolanda Coco Ferraro (30 June 1909 – 21 February 2019) was a Peruvian activist and political leader of the nationalist Revolutionary Union party.

== Biography ==
Coco was born in 1909 in Callao, Peru. She was the eldest daughter of Fernando Coco Buda and María Ferraro, who were both Italian. Her father was a Sicilian sailor.

Coco became a Sanchezcerrista and was Secretaria General del Feminismo of the Revolutionary Union. After the assassination of Luis Miguel Sánchez Cerro in 1933, Coco organised a pilgrimage to his tomb.

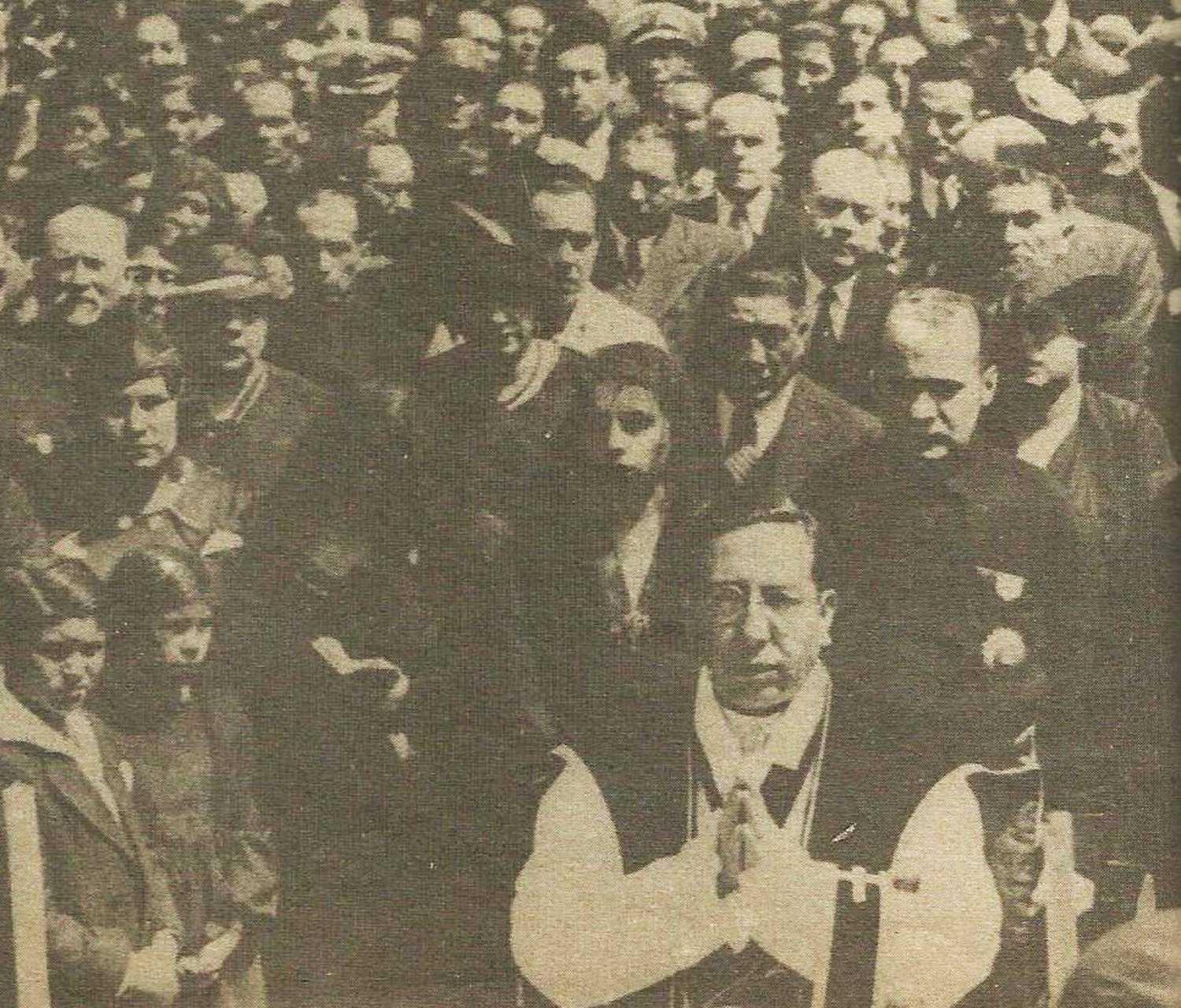
Pilgrimage of members of the Revolutionary Union, including Coco (centre, behind the priest), to the tomb of Luis Miguel Sánchez Cerro

Coco was arrested under suspicion of participating in a revolutionary plot against the life of Óscar R. Benavides. She was detained in Lima. She was released in 1934 and resumed her activism.

Coco died in 2019 in San Isidro, Peru, aged 109.
