= Oswaldo Baca =

Peruvian chemist and professor

Oswaldo Mendoza Baca (August 5, 1908- April 9, 1962 in Cusco) was a Peruvian chemist and professor. He was particularly interested in genetics.

== Biography ==
Oswaldo Mendoza Baca was born in the city of Cusco on August 5, 1908. He studied at the First Central Primary School in Cusco and the National College of Sciences and Arts of Cuzco.

In 1929 he joined the Faculty of Natural Sciences, Physics and Mathematics at the National University of San Antonio Abad in Cuzco and graduated as a Bachelor of Science in June 1933 .

True to his alma mater, in 1933 he was appointed acting Professor of Inorganic Chemistry and Organic Chemistry in the Faculty of Science, just two months before graduating from BA . Thanks to a grant from the Spanish government he travelled to Spain, beginning in research under the direction of Dr. Angel del Campo. In 1937 he returned to Peru because of the Spanish Civil War, graduated from the University of Cusco.

On November 3, 1960, he was elected Dean of the Faculty of Chemistry at the University of Cusco, a position he held until his death in Cusco on April 9, 1962.

Notable publications include La Mecánica Ondulatoria, Colorantes Pre-colombinos and Leyes Genéticas de los Elementos Químicos, Nuevo Sistema Periódico (1954).
