= Walter Peñaloza =

Peruvian philosopher and educator

Walter Peñaloza (1920–2005) was a Peruvian philosopher and educator recognised for his contribution to the professional training of Peruvian teachers. He studied at the former Anglo-Peruvian College in Lima, today the Colegio San Andrés . Later, while working as a teacher on the same campus, he won the First "Gonzales Prada" Prize in 1944, granted by the Directorate of Artistic Education Cultural Extension to the best philosophy work.

== Career ==
He was Rector of the National University of Education (La Cantuta) and a professor at other universities in Peru and Venezuela (Zulia State, Maracaibo). He inspired the development of the "Integral Curriculum", a curricular model that promotes a formation in values, and a greater contact between the university and the professional workplace.

His major contributions to Peruvian education were in the reform in university education. These include:

- The semesterisation of courses
- Unification of teacher training for initial, primary and secondary schools.
- Promotion of the system of university credit to enable a greater comparability between the curricula of different universities. This system is still used in Peruvian universities.
- Intensification of pre-professional practice.
- In 2004, he received a distinction from the University Garcilaso for having urged the universal provision of early childhood education to the Education Reform body of the Velasco government.

In 1975 he was appointed Director of the (now discontinued) newspaper "La Prensa". One of his important actions was the publication of the children's magazine "Urpi", where he put into practice his proposal for the formation of values. This magazine was considered revolutionary at the time, especially in the popular sector; its reception was such that initial publication runs sold-out. Its editor Gladys Pradó, brought together many of the best of artists and intellectuals in the Peruvian children's field, leading "Urpi" to become recognised among the three most important children's magazines in Latin American history.

He was made an outstanding member of the Order of the Palmas Magisteriales—a distinction granted by the Peruvian State through the Ministry of Education to recognise teachers or intellectuals, who have contributed to the progress of education, science, culture and technology in Peru.

== Works ==
=== Books ===
- (1946) The evolution of Greek knowledge: Hylozoism-Eleaticism. Peruvian Society of Philosophy. Lima.
- (1955) Study about knowledge. Author's Edition. Lima.
- (1961) Introduction to Philosophy and Logic. Editorial Leoncio Prado Military Academy. Lima.
- (1962) Inferential knowledge transcendental deduction. Philosophical Library National University of San Marcos. Lima.
- (1973) The discourse of Parmenides. Editor Ignacio Prado, Lima.
- (1980) Educational Technology. Published by the Business School of the Andrés Bello Andina. 2nd edition. Lima.
- (1989) The Cantuta. A background in education. CONYTEC sponsored Edition, Lima.
- (2000) The comprehensive curriculum. Optimize editors, Lima.
- (2000) A judgement about the school. Pour Magisterial Edition. Lima.
- (2001) Language teaching. INLEC editions. Lima.
- (2003) The aims of education. Pedagogical Publishing Fund of San Marcos. Lima.
- (2004) The execution algorithm curriculum. Pedagogical Publishing Fund of San Marcos. Lima.

=== Articles ===
- PEÑALOZA, Walter (1938) Study on Aristotle's categories, In: Letters No. 11, p. 481-494. Lima.
- (1943) The literary manifestations of Western man and anthropologism. In History No. 3, pp. 220–231. Lima.
- (1947) Overview of the current philosophy in Peru. In: Quarterly of modern culture, National University of Colombia, pp. 105–111. Bogotá.
- (1947) Philosophy in Peru until Deustua. In: Peruvian Mercury Vol XXVIII, No. 246, p. 411-424. Lima.
- (1950) Crisis evidentista conception of man. In: Lyrics Peruanas, year II. Lima.
- (1950) The origin knowledge Kant. In: Archives of the Peruvian Society of Philosophy. Volume III, p. 188-205. Lima.
- (1952) Report of the Director of the Pedagogical Institute of man-years 1951-1952. INPV Printing. Lima.
- (1954) Report of the Director of the Pedagogical Institute of man-years 1953-1954. INPV Printing. Lima.
- (1956) Report of the Director of the Pedagogical Institute of Men-1955-1956. INPV Printing. Lima.
- (1963) Introduction to humanism. Unec. Lima. (Brochure type), 35 pp.
- (1977) Educational Technology. In: Educational policy and educational technology. Ministry of Education and Electroperú. (Mimeographed booklet). pp. 25–36. Lima.
- (1978) Kant, The problem of the pure concepts of understanding. In: German philosophy, David Sobrevilla Editor, Editorial Fund Cayetano Heredia University, pp. 39–57.
- (1986) On the humanistic educational technology. (Interview) In: Uses and Abuses of educational technology. Edited by IPP. Lima. pp. 68–83.
- (1991) Educational policy in Latin America. In: Education, Journal of the National University of Education, Lima, Year 1, No. 1, p. 5-11.
- (1992) Postgraduate studies: teaching and curriculum. In: Rimaq, Journal of the Graduate School of the UNE, Lima, Year 1, No. 1, pp. 7–17.
- (1997) Affective relationships of children aged 0 to 6 years. In: Latin American Journal of Educational Innovation. Year IX, No. 26 July 1997. pp. 119–144.
- (1999) The disappointment of the twentieth century and possible ways of philosophizing. In: American Utopia and practice. International Journal of Philosophy and Social Theory Iberoamericana. Universidad del Zulia, Volume 4 - No. 8, from September to December. p. 7-25.
- (2000) The problem of skills. In: Peruvian Journal of Education, Year V, No. 05, pp. 5–28. Lima.
- (2000) The disappointment of the twentieth century and possible ways of philosophizing. In: The philosophy of the twentieth century: progress and prospects. Proceedings of the Seventh National Congress of Philosophy. Miguel Giusti Editor, Editorial PUCP Fund, pp. 269–287. Lima.
- (2003) Augusto Salazar Bondy. In: www.sisbib.unmsm.edu.pe
- (2005) Knowledge, job training, evaluative attitudes and experiences in education. In: www.huascaran.edu.pe.
- (2005) Policies and approaches to curriculum and teaching for the graduate. In: www.sisbib.unmsm.edu.pe.
- (2005) José María Arguedas in my memory. In: Wardrobe, Journal of the Faculty of Social Sciences and Humanities Year 2, No. 2. pp. 11–19. Lima.
- (2005) The book 'much do teachers' Luis Piscoya Hermoza. In: Walter Penaloza Ramella 1920-2005. Teacher wise and good. Editing the Office of Institutional Image. National University of Education. Lima.
