= Ricardo Silva (musician) =

Peruvian musician and artist (born 1982)

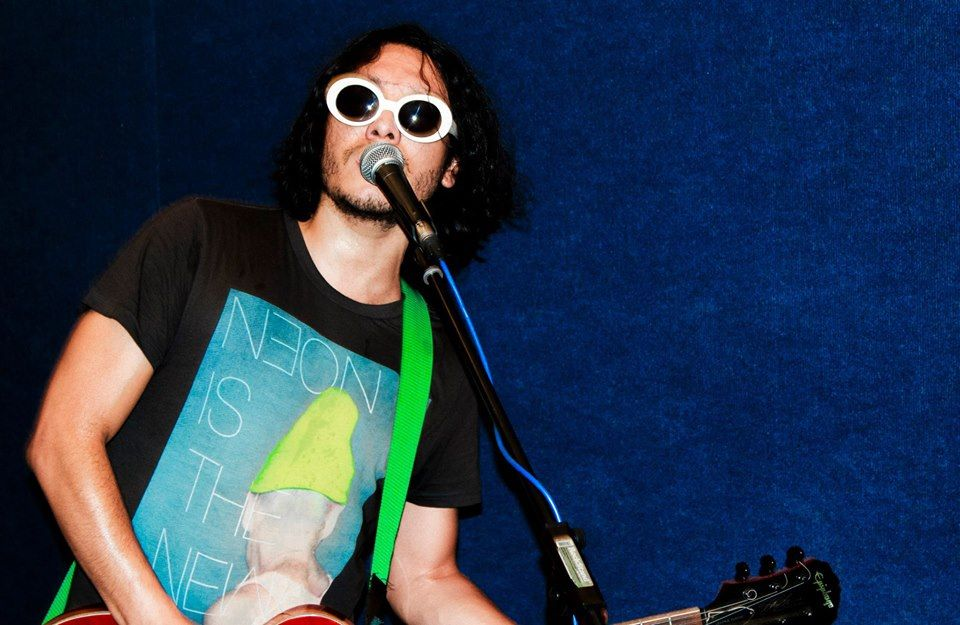
Ricardo Silva Gonzales, photo taken in Salamanca, Spain

Ricardo Silva Gonzáles (born October 27, 1982) is a Peruvian musician and artist, best known as the lead singer, guitarist, and primary songwriter of the grunge band Sedansored. Silva formed Sedansored in Lima as a personal project after he split with his former band "Ala2" in 2000. He moved to Norway in 2011 and established Sedansored as part of the Bergen music scene. In 2014 Ricardo appeared on the Norwegian television show "Idol Norge" performing the American folk song "Where did you sleep last night". He finished up the audition by throwing his guitar, making him the first person to do this on any Idol audition worldwide.
