= María del Socorro Heysen =

Peruvian economist and banker

María del Socorro Heysen Zegarra (born 1960) is a Peruvian economist and banker. After serving as deputy manager of monetary policy at Peru's Central Reserve Bank, in 1997 she was appointed deputy superintendent of banks at the Superintendency of Banks and Insurance (SBS) where she became superintendent in 2017. She has also worked for the International Monetary Fund and has served as a consultant for the World Bank.

== Biography ==
Born in Lima on 2 January 1960, María del Socorro Heysen Zegarra is the daughter of the politician Luis Heysen Incháustegui (1903–1980) and his wife Angélica Zegarra Russo. She is one of the family's three children. Heysen Zegarra is an economics graduate from the Pontifical Catholic University of Peru (1977–1982) and has a master's degree from the University of California, Los Angeles.

Her first professional post was at Peru's Central Reserve Bank where she was deputy manager of monetary policy from 1994 to 1997. She then served as deputy superintendent of banks at the SBS (1997–2002). In 2004, she was appointed deputy manager of Banking Supervision and Regulation at the International Monetary Fund. She has also been a consultant for the World Bank. She was appointed superintendent of the SBS in 2017, following her official designation in August 2016.

As the first woman to head SBS, she commented in an interview with the journal Progreso that although the number of women in senior management positions was still low, efforts for change would encourage the development of more inclusive policies favouring the professional development of women.
