= Rubén Castillo Anchapuri =

Peruvian theologist and biologist (1931–2009)

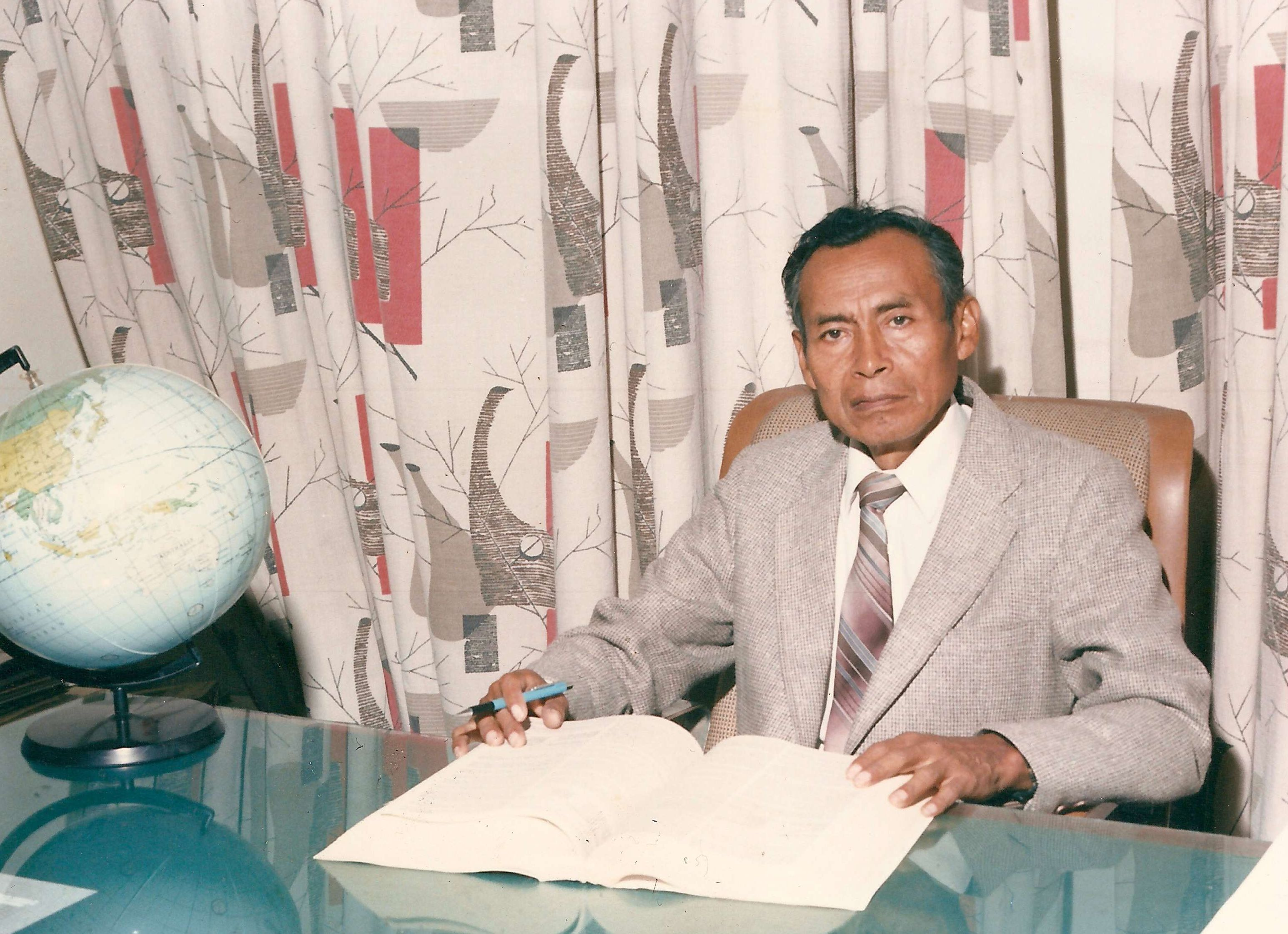
Rubén Castillo Anchapuri

Rubén Castillo Anchapuri (March 18, 1931 – February 17, 2009) was a Peruvian theologist and biologist. After the formation of the Universidad Unión Incaica in January 1984, Anchapuri was made the head of the University Council established in May of that year.
