= Pastorita Huaracina =

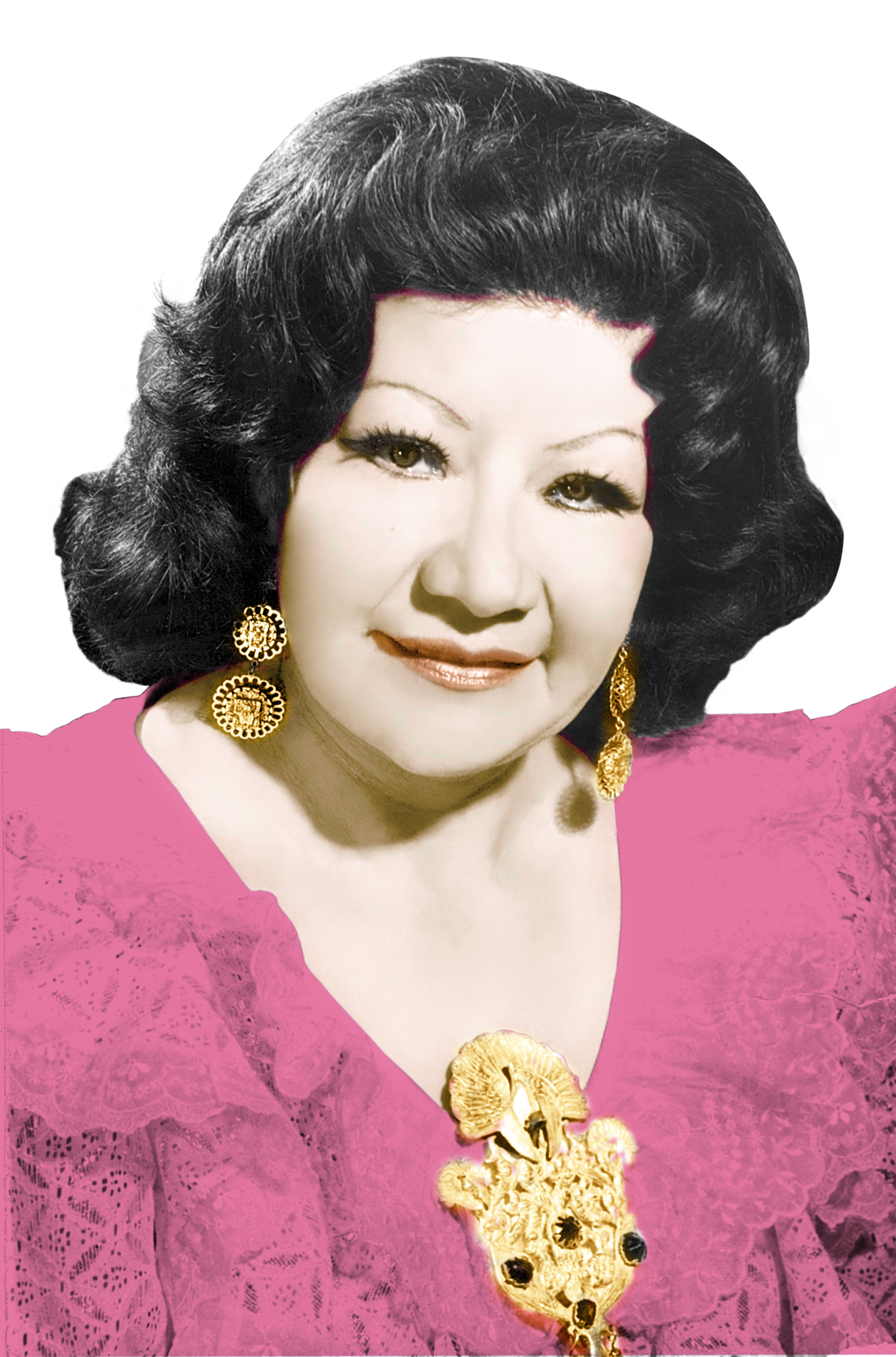

Pastorita Huaracina (December 19, 1930 - May 2001) born María Alvarado Trujillo, was a Peruvian singer who strongly identified with the traditions of the rural Andes. Her career began in the era of 78 rpm records and lasted into that of compact discs. In the 1950s she recorded 4 songs a month and sold more records in Peru than the Beatles. Her success established her reputation as the diva of Andean song and she won every award that pertained to her type of music. She toured extensively in Europe, Asia, and the Americas.

== Biography ==
Pastorita Huaracina was born in the Malvas district of Aija Province, Ancash region. Reportedly, even as a young child tending the flocks, she already loved to sing. Raised speaking Quechua, upon the death of her mother she traveled to Lima at the age of 8, with no luggage or money and no one to meet her, and speaking very little Spanish.

She debuted as a performer on her 12th birthday. She began as a performer of Andean dances but later became a singer and composer of songs. She developed a reputation as disciplined trouper, always the first to arrive at a rehearsal or performance; this continued even once she became a star. She always advocated for authenticity in the performance of Andean music and dance, including the use of traditional outfits: "typical dress is not a costume, it is part of our identity, something we must assume with honor and pride, being conscious of whom we represent..."

Her singing became a symbol of liberty and of a demand for the rights of the serranos, the people of the high Andes, expressing beauty but also bearing the people's demand for opportunity and conditions for their development. On her program on Radio Santa Rosa, Canta el Perú Profundo she openly expressed her opposition to the dictatorship of Alberto Fujimori and Vladimiro Montesinos, and she was a longtime defender of the validity of the Quechua language. Loyal to her principles, she refused significant sums of money from politicians who solicited her for their electoral campaigns and from businesses which she felt unfairly exploited the people. Towards the end of her life, only one week after an operation and in delicate health, she voted in the Peruvian presidential election of 2001. She died of cancer in 2001.
