= Enrique Guzmán y Valle =

Peruvian chemist and professor

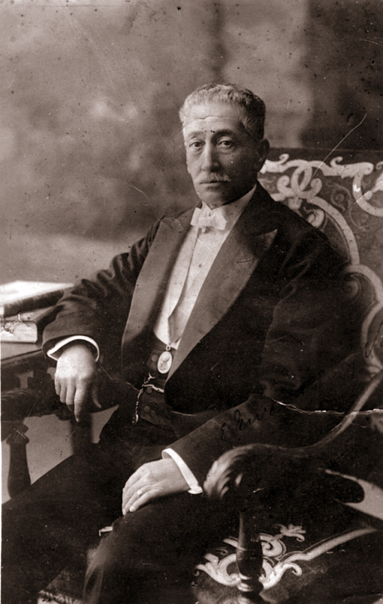
Enrique Guzmán y Valle

Enrique Guzmán y Valle (27 July 1854 – 1923) was a Peruvian chemist and professor.

Enrique Guzmán y Valle was born in Lima. He attended school in the College of Our Lady of Guadalupe in Lima.

He attended the Faculty of Sciences of the National University of San Marcos and obtained a bachelor's degree on April 14, 1877 and his Ph.D. on June 22 of that year.

On 24 August 1880 he was appointed Professor of Physics of the University of San Marcos and on 6 August 1881 became Associate Professor of Chemistry and General Physics, Faculty of Science there. On 17 October 1881 he was appointed Professor of Chemistry at the university. On 3 August 1885 he became Managing Director of the Chemistry laboratory and on 8 June 1886 he was elected Secretary of the Faculty of Science, Senior Lecturer and Associate Professor of Analytical Chemistry and General Physics.

Guzmán y Valle was the head of General Chemistry for 12 years until 6 November 1897, and by Act of Congress of 27 September 1893 was declared Professor Principal Consultant of the subject of Analytical Chemistry.

He was also a member of the Higher Council of Public Instruction and the National Council of Education.

Guzmán y Valle was professor of mathematics at the College of Our Lady of Guadalupe, of chemistry at the Naval Academy and the Military School of Chorrillos. He was Director of the School of Preceptors (later National Educational Institute for Boys).

He founded the Meteorological Observatory of Lima, with support from the Mayor of Lima, César Canevaro.

During the Pacific War, he was employed in the construction of torpedoes and the manufacture of chemicals to be used as disinfection against possible diseases.

He gives his name to a university in Lima, Universidad Nacional de Educación Enrique Guzmán y Valle.
