= Max González Olaechea =

Peruvian doctor, clinician and university professor (1867–1946)

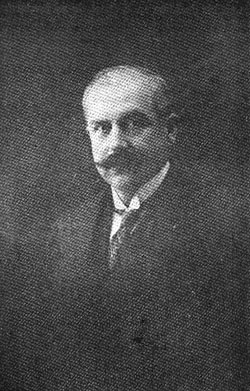
Max González Olaechea, 1920

Maximiliano González Olaechea (November 30, 1867, in Arequipa, Peru – February 5, 1946, in Ica) was a Peruvian medical doctor, clinician and university professor.

He carried out his studies at the School of Medicine of the National University of San Marcos in Lima, Peru, where he graduated with a thesis on cirrhosis. He was a doctor and professor in Peru, three times dean of the School of Medicine, Head of the General Pathology Department, the Clinical Medicine Department, the Forensics Department, the Surgical Nosography Department, the Pathology and Pre-medicine Department, the Semiology Department and the Male Clinical Medicine Department.

He was the president of National Academy of Medicine between 1921 and 1923 and the first Latin American doctor to be named a Member of Honor of the American Academy of Medicine in New York City.
