= National University of Saint Anthony the Abbot in Cusco =

University in Peru

Coordinates: 13°31′12″S 71°57′28″W

Universidad Nacional de San Antonio Abad del Cusco
- Universidad Nacional de San Antonio Abad del Cusco
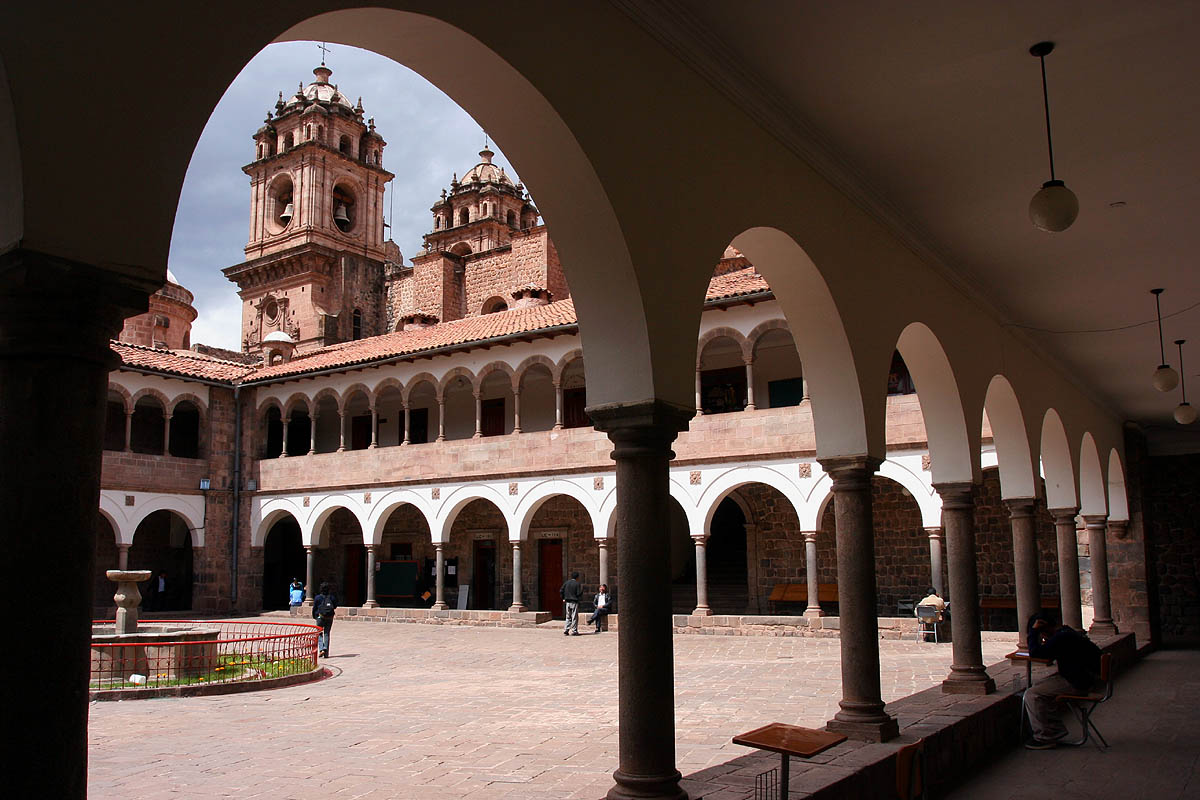
- Interior view of the historical premises of the UNSAAC
- Type: Public University
- Established: 1692; 334 years ago
- Rector: Victor Raul Aguilar Callo
- Students: 14,828
- Postgraduates: 3,200
- Location: Cusco, Peru
- Website: www.unsaac.edu.pe

The National University of Saint Anthony the Abbot in Cusco (Spanish: Universidad Nacional de San Antonio Abad del Cusco) (UNSAAC), also known as Saint Anthony University of Cusco or University of Cusco, is a public university in Cusco, Peru and one of the oldest in the country. Its foundation was first proposed on March 1, 1692, at the urging and support of Pope Innocent XII. The document in which Pope Innocent XII sponsored the founding of the university was signed in Madrid, Spain by King Charles II on June 1, 1692, thus becoming Cusco's principal and oldest university. The university was authorized to confer the bachelors, licentiate, masters, and doctorate degrees.

UNSAAC consistently ranks among the top ten universities in the country. It currently has 24 faculties with 37 professorial chairs and 29 academic departments.

== Alumni ==
- José Bustamante y Rivero - President of Peru 1945-1948
- Oswaldo Baca (1908-1962) - chemist
- Trinidad María Enríquez (1846–1891) 1st woman to graduate from university in Peru
- Valentín Paniagua - Interim President of Peru after Alberto Fujimori resigned in November 2000

== Eponyms ==
UNSAAC is commemorated in the scientific name of a species of lizard, Proctoporus unsaacae, which is endemic to Peru.

== See also ==
- List of universities in Peru
- Saint Anthony the Abbot Seminary
- Maria Antonieta Quispe Ricalde – Peruvian biologist and alumna
- List of colonial universities in Hispanic America
- List of Jesuit sites
