= José Manuel Valdés =

José Manuel Valdés (1767 – July 29, 1843) was a Peruvian medical doctor, poet, philosopher, Latinist, and Parliamentarian. Eventually he became a prominent figure in Lima society at the dawn of the Republic of Peru. He was born a mulatto, having both Native American and African blood. Due to his dark skin color, he struggled against racist legislation that prohibited Valdes from continuing his primary education (which he received as a reward from the wealthy Spanish family her mother worked for) into his adolescent years. In 1801, he stunned Peruvians by declaring that cancer is not contagious. Although initially criticized, confirmation of his discovery in Europe brought him great respect, which otherwise would have been impossible to attain, given his racial status.

== Childhood ==
Manuel's mother was named María del Carmen Cavada. She was Spanish and Caucasian, and worked as a washerwoman. His father was named Baltazar Valdes, and was a native American who worked as a musician. Maria del Carmen was a native of Lima, Peru. Baltazar was a native of Sana, Peru. Maria del Carmen worked for a Spaniard man named Valdes, who owned a pharmacy, and was married to Dona Mariana. The family that Maria del Carmen worked for christened Valdes at a young age, at which time Maria bestowed upon her son the name of Jose Manuel. As a result of being appreciated by his mother's Caucasian employers, they became his godparents, and Jose was sent off to primary school. Dona Mariana's confessor (Dona Mariana was Catholic), was the principal of a high school maintained by the Order of St. Augustine in Lima. For the protection of Jose, Dona Mariana and her husband placed Manuel Valdes in the care of the Order of St. Augustine, and he studied at the school, learning to count, write, and read books.

== Early career ==
In adolescence, Jose wanted to continue learning, studying to become a priest, but he was stopped by legislation prohibiting mestizos, mulattos, and African men from becoming priests. This prohibited Valdés from continuing his primary education (which he received as a reward from the wealthy Spanish family that owned him) into his adolescent years. He resolved then to become a Latin surgeon as a teenager, going to the hospital San Andres Hospital in search of training in anatomy. His best training came from Hipolito Unanue, who later became the most renowned physician in Peru at the time. In 1788, Valdes obtained his degree as a "Latin" Surgeon, authorizing him to perform emergency surgery. Through unparalleled skill in his practice, he obtained brilliant testimonials to his work from Juan de la Roca and Hipolito Unanue. He uses these to gain special permission from the supreme Peruvian authority on medicine at the time, the Protomedico, who granted him the permission to practice medical cures for one year only. Valdes' practice proved so skillful and valuable, that he remained in operation as a surgeon for over fifteen years. He began accumulating wealth and bought a house, to which he brought his mother, his sister, Maria de Pilar, and his godmother, the widow of the pharmacist. His patients were the members of the highest ranking families in Peru. Though Valdés was well acquainted with many well to do families, his mulatto status prevented him from being able to seek any companion, and To fill the gap in his life, he delved deeply into his profession, importing only the most modern books from Europe, and the best medical instruments. After 1791. he began collaborating on the Mercurio Peruano. In 1793, Valdes published his dissertation on the method of curing dysentery.

== Controversy in his career ==
In 1801, he wrote a treatise denying the popular belief at the time, accepted by medical professionals and laymen alike, that uterine cancer is contagious. His claim caused great protest in Lima, but he responded with humility and silence. Soon thereafter, news came from Europe confirming cancer is not contagious, silencing Valdes' opposition.

== Recognition and Elevated Position ==
He overcame great obstacles, including the prohibition of colored folk becoming priests, but he still wanted to obtain a college education. The intelligence of Valdes in 1792 led the town council of Peru to ask the King to overlook the color of Valdes' skin, and Charles VI did so. In 1807, Valdes entered the gates of the University he had been prohibited from entering long ago. Upon entry, he read his thesis, and obtained his bachelor's degree immediately upon entry (with special permission). Also, the time of practice required between the bachelor's and doctor's degrees were waived completely for Valdes, and at the same time he obtained his doctorate degree together with his bachelor's degree. In 1811, he became a Professor of clinical medicine in the University of San Marcos. His research on the influence of copaiba balsam in children's convulsions was reprinted in France. In 1815, he was elected to the Royal Academy of Madrid.

== Poetry and Late life ==
Valdes attempts to become a priest, receiving permission from the Pope to do so despite being colored. After presenting himself to the archbishop, the archbishop was scared that a colored man might join the Holy Orders, and Valdes retracted immediately, apologizing for his "daring" actions. In 1841, he went to Congress as a deputy for Lima. He became Physician to the Government Council. In 1835, he became First Physician of Peru, or Protomedico. In 1840, he became director of a medical college. Finally, he died on July 29, 1843.
