= Carlos M. Ochoa =

Carlos Manuel Ochoa Nieves (27 November 1920, Cusco – † 11 December 2008, Lima) was a Peruvian plant breeder, botanist, ethnobotanist and expert in potato taxonomy.

== Biography ==
Born in Cusco, Peru, Ochoa received degrees from the Universidad Mayor de San Simón, Cochabamba, Bolivia and from the University of Minnesota, USA. For a long time Ochoa worked as a wheat and potato breeder. He created important Peruvian potato varieties including Renacimiento, Yungay, and Tomasa Condemayta.

Ochoa collected many native potato varieties and wild potato species. One third of the nearly 200 known wild potato species were first described by him.

Ochoa was professor emeritus of the Universidad Nacional Agraria La Molina, Peru. In 1971, he joined the International Potato Center. He received many international awards, including Distinguished Economic Botanist and the William Brown award for Plant Genetic Resources.

== Selected publications ==
- 1962. Los Solanum tuberiferos silvestres del Perú : Secc. Tuberarium, Sub.-Secc. Hyperbasarthrum
- 1991. The Potatoes of South America. Bolivia. Cambridge Press. 570 pp. ISBN 0-521-38024-3
- 1999. Las papas de Sudamérica. Centro Internacional de la Papa. ISBN 92-9060-197-3
- 2006. Ugent, D.; C.M. Ochoa. La Etnobotánica Del Perú : Desde La Prehistoria Al Presente. Consejo Nacional de Ciencia, Tecnologia e Innovacion Tecnologica, CONCYTEC. 379 pp. ISBN 9972-50-050-0

== See also ==
- Jack Hawkes (botanist) – another wild potato botanist.
