= Jorge Aliaga Cacho =

Peruvian sociologist

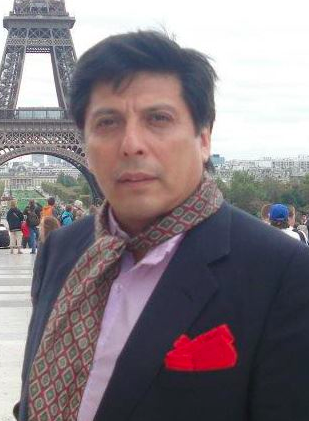
- Born: Lima, Peru
- Occupations: Writer and sociologist
- Writing career
- Notable works: Mufida, La angolesa, Secreto de desamor, Terrorism in Peru
- Website: www.jorgealiagacacho.com

Jorge Aliaga Cacho, is a writer and sociologist born in Lima, Peru. He entered the National Institute of Culture where he was elected President of the Association of Workers (ATINC). In his capacity as chairman he played an important role in the formation of the Confederation of State Employees (CITE). He was awarded the "City of Ayacucho medal" for literary merit, the city where Latin Americans sealed their independence from Spain, he was also awarded the "Josè Marìa Arguedas" medal from the Global Association of Writers and Artists, (La Asociaciòn de Escritores y Artistas del Or be). He has published a novel, "Secreto de desamor", Renteria Editores, Lima, 2007 and a book of short stories: "Mufida, La angolesa", Editores Altazor, Lima, 2011.

== Early life ==
Jorge Aliaga Cacho, is a writer and sociologist born in Lima, Peru. He completed his primary education at “La Rectora”, and attended secondary school, intermittently, at various institutions, including the same infamous military school attended by Mario Vargas Llosa (Leoncio Prado), before scaling its high walls and 'escaping' a few weeks into term so he could go to a party. At only 16 years of age, the author ventured into politics. He first participated in the Peruvian Committee for the Liberation of Angela Davis, and also served on the Committee to Support the Struggle of the Vietnamese people. By that time he had begun his first job as an accounting clerk, before being moved to the billing department to work as a debt collector. On the streets of Lima, he discovered not only the architecture of the city, but the idiosyncrasies of his people that he registers accurately in the content of his writing.

== Work ==
In 1973, Aliaga travelled to Cuba where he had the opportunity to participate in an event hosted by Fidel Castro and Angela Davis's sister, Rosa Davis, a prominent activist in the American Black Power Movement.

After a few weeks in Cuba, the author travelled to Berlin to participate in the World Festival of Youth and Students. The trip was on board the Cuban ship " Aniversario XX" in which also travelled: Teófilo Stevenson (Cuban Olympic boxing champion), Rosa Davis and Peruvians Juan Gonzalo Rose, Mario Delgado and Susana Baca, (former Minister of Culture in Ollanta Humala's government). In 1974, he was appointed administrator of the bookshop "Siglo XX" in Lima, where he promoted socialist literature.

In 1975, Aliaga entered the National Institute of Culture where he was elected President of the Association of Workers (ATINC). In his capacity as chairman, he played an important role in the formation of the Confederation of State Employees (CITE). In 1978 Aliaga enrolled in the first course for Cultural Promoters sponsored by UNESCO in Lima.

In 1981, Jorge Aliaga, exiled in the United Kingdom, travelled to London, then headed to Scotland. He was engaged in a variety of jobs: art model, restaurateur, customs officer for the British Airports Authority, translator and interpreter, news researcher, teacher, etc.

He opened the first Peruvian Peña in the UK: "Café Peña Jananti" which soon became a centre of activity for the promotion of Peruvian and Latin American culture. This venue was frequented by artists and personalities such as: Robin Harper (leader of the Scottish Green Party), guitarist Galo Cerón, the bands Inti-Illimani, Awatiñas, Rumillajta, Inti Raymi, Amaru de Tinta and Apu, actor Russell Hunter, artist, writer and ex-convict Jimmy Boyle, Mick Magahey (leader of the Scottish miners), television presenter Muriel Gray, Ray Newton (previous winner of Edinburgh Citizen of the Year), Gordon McLennan (head of the Communist Party of Great Britain), Arthur Milligan (Founder member of Communist Party of Scotland), artist and photographer Iain Mackay, musician Edgar Villarroel, theatre group Guanaco, writer and Peruvian diplomat Carlos Zavaleta, poet David Smith, musician Ernesto Valdez Chacón, musician Julio Benavente Díaz, DJ Nano Fernández, and Violet Williamson among others.

Jorge Aliaga studied at Glasgow University where he received a master's degree in Sociology and Latin American Studies. He also studied at St Andrew's University where he read the Literature of the River Plate and the Latin American Essay.

He was an active member of the Trade Unionist movement and remains involved in Scottish politics. He had the opportunity to meet Julieta Campusano, Minister for Salvador Allende, and coordinated activities with her for the solidarity of the Chilean people oppressed by the dictator Pinochet.

He was a union representative for the National Union of Public Employees (NUPE) and supported the struggle of miners in Scotland. With NUPE, he organised a strike at the Edinburgh College of Art, which culminated in a successful negotiation of a list of demands that won higher wages, bonuses and permanent contracts for art models in all Scottish art schools.

He was also President of the Latin American Society at the University of Glasgow, President of the Scottish Peruvian Friendship Society, founding member of the Communist Party of Scotland and the Scottish Socialist Party.

Jorge Aliaga Cacho did teacher training at the University of Edinburgh. He has taught Spanish, Latin American history and literature at George Heriot's School, Telford College, West Lothian College, The Spanish Language Consultancy and others around Scotland.

He was awarded the "City of Ayacucho medal" for literary merit, the city where Latin Americans sealed their independence from Spain, he was also awarded the "Josè Marìa Arguedas" medal from the Global Association of Writers and Artists, (La Asociaciòn de Escritores y Artistas del Orbe).

After many years Jorge Aliaga Cacho has now returned to his homeland and currently resides between both Scotland and Peru.

== Publications ==
"La Casa de la Magdalena", Olaya Editores, (1977), a history of the house of Simon Bolivar in Peru, "Essays of Resistance" the University of Glasgow, (1991), three essays on Latin America, "Terrorism in Peru", Jananti, Edinburgh, (1995), a tale of the war between the government of Peru and the Shining Path insurgent organisation. He has also translated the essay "El destino de Norteamérica " by José Carlos Mariátegui into English, Prontaprint, Edinburgh, (1998).: "The destiny of North America." He has published a novel, "Secreto de desamor", Renteria Editores, Lima, (2007); a book of short stories: "Mufida, La angolesa", Editores Altazor, Lima, (2011); a book of poems, "Mujeres malas Mujeres buenas", "Vicio Perpetuo Vicio Perfecto", Lima, (2013); "Jananti", Personal Anthology, "Ediciones Luz y Vida", Huacho, (2021).
