= Yolanda Falcón Lizaraso =

Yolanda Carolina Falcón Lizaraso
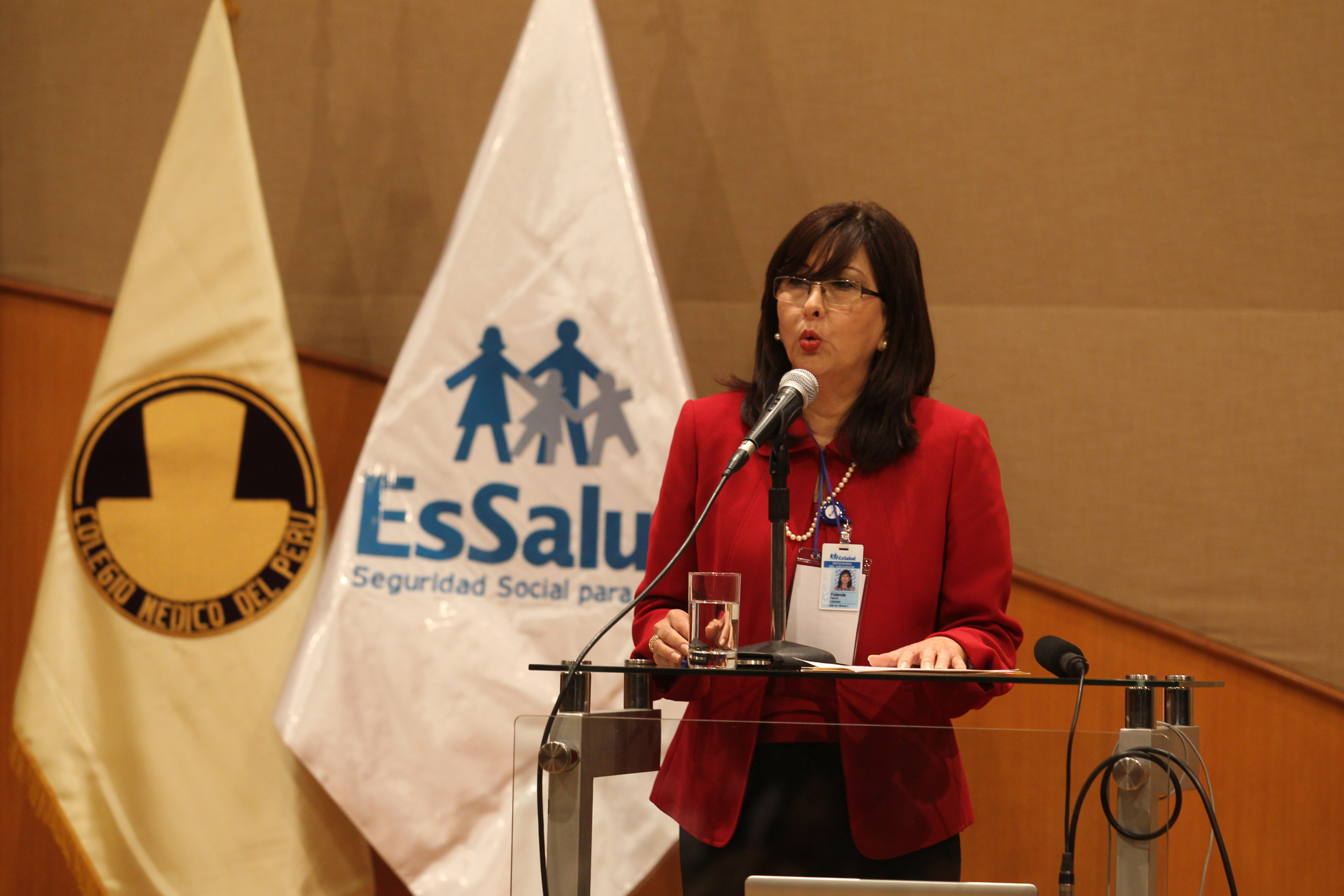
- Born: October 9, 1959 (age 67); Durham, North Carolina, USA
- Education: Universidad Nacional de Trujillo
- Occupation: Lawyer

Yolanda Carolina Falcón Lizaraso (born October 9, 1959) is a lawyer and official from Peru. She was an agent from the Defensoría del Pueblo of the regions of La Libertad and Callao and Ensured's Defender of Seguro Social de Salud del Perú. Since 1983, she has worked as a lawyer and specializes in the defense of rights, management conflict, and public health.

== Education ==
Lizaraso studied law at the Universidad Nacional de Trujillo, where she graduated in 1983. She had further studies in Health Management and Social Management that allowed her to hold public office in the Peruvian capital and provinces.

== Public work ==
After graduating from college, she began her career as a litigator in 1997 that would allow her to assume the leadership of the office of the Defensoría del Pueblo del Perú in the region of La Libertad. For 12 years, she assumed the tasks of defending citizens' rights, managing social conflicts and combating violence. In 2009, she moved to the Callao, where she led the ombudsman's office in taking measures for this population addressing claims from 1.5 million and 100 thousand citizens of Huaral and Barranca for 3 years.

In 2012, she joined the ranks of the Social Health Insurance Peru EsSalud insured as Advocate and Central Insured Service Manager attending claims for 11 million users working closely with Peruvian journalists and opinion leaders to overcome the shortcomings in hospital care of patients.
