= Hernando Cevallos =

Peruvian doctor and politician

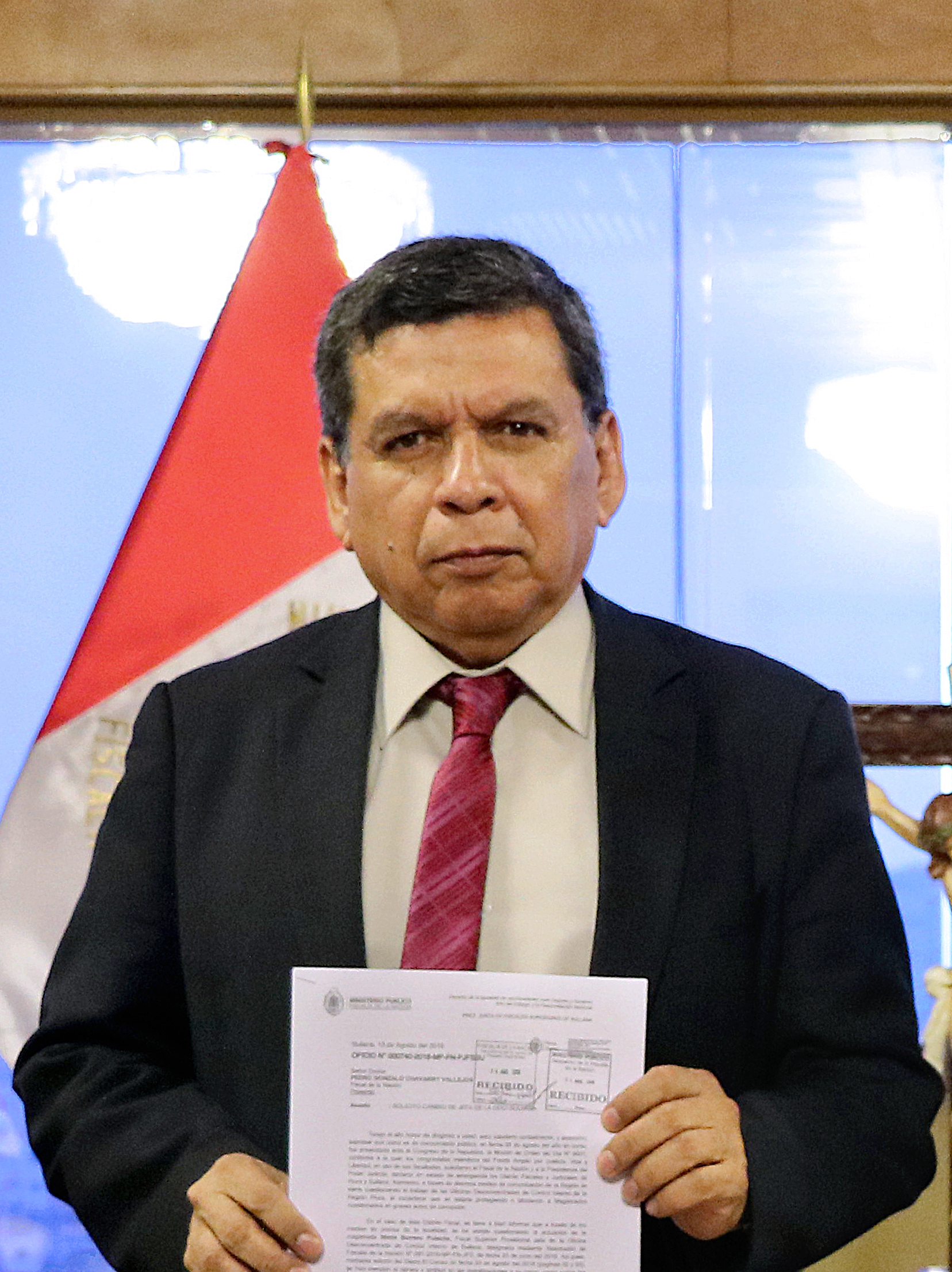

Minister of Health
- In office 29 July 2021 – 8 February 2022
- President: Pedro Castillo
- Prime Minister: Guido Bellido; Mirtha Vásquez; Héctor Valer
- Preceded by: Óscar Ugarte
- Succeeded by: Hernán Condori

Member of Congress
- In office 26 July 2016 – 30 September 2019
- Constituency: Piura

Personal details
- Born: Hernando Ismael Cevallos Flores; 14 October 1956 (age 69) Piura, Peru
- Party: Broad Front
- Education: National University of La Plata
- Profession: Medical doctor

Hernando Ismael Cevallos Flores (born 14 October 1956) is a Peruvian doctor and former Minister of Health of Peru.

== Career ==
Cevallos was born in Piura and graduated as a doctor from the National University of La Plata.

He was president of the Medical Federation of Piura in 1999 and 2000. He was also dean of the Medical College of Piura during 2000 and 2001.

He worked for 26 years at the Santa Rosa Hospital of the Ministry of Health and for 23 years at the Belén Clinic in Piura.

He also served as a lecturer at the National University of Piura during 2013 and 2014.

=== Political life ===
Cevallos was elected Congressman of the Republic by the Broad Front for Piura in the 2016 general elections.

During his time as a congressman, he promoted laws to improve the labor regime of health workers and also the law that regulates the medicinal and therapeutic use of cannabis.

On 30 September 2019, his parliamentary post came to an end after the dissolution of Congress by then President Martín Vizcarra.

He was also part of the Peru Libre technical team in the Second Round of the 2021 general elections.

== Health Minister ==
On 29 July 2021, Cevallos was appointed Minister of Health of Peru in the Pedro Castillo government.
