= Ministry of Health (Peru) =

Government ministry of Peru

- Ministerio de Salud
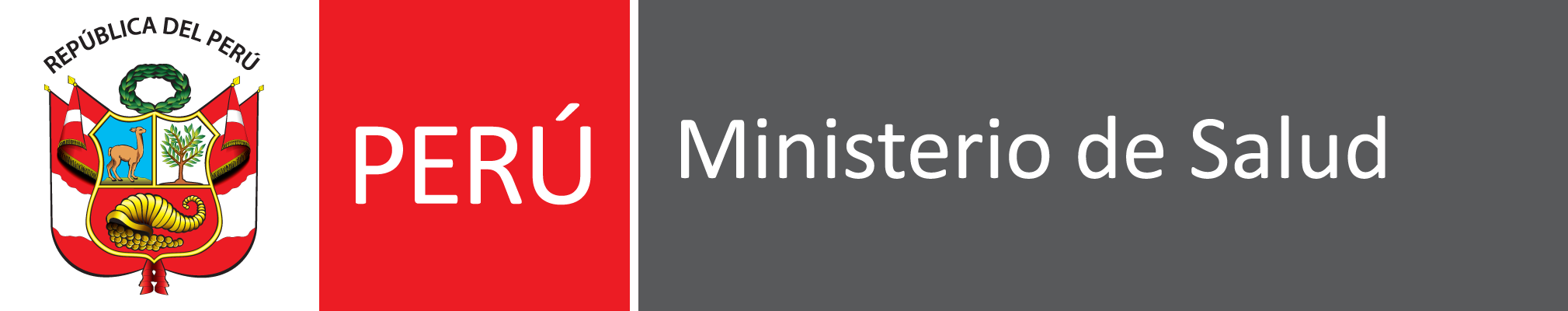

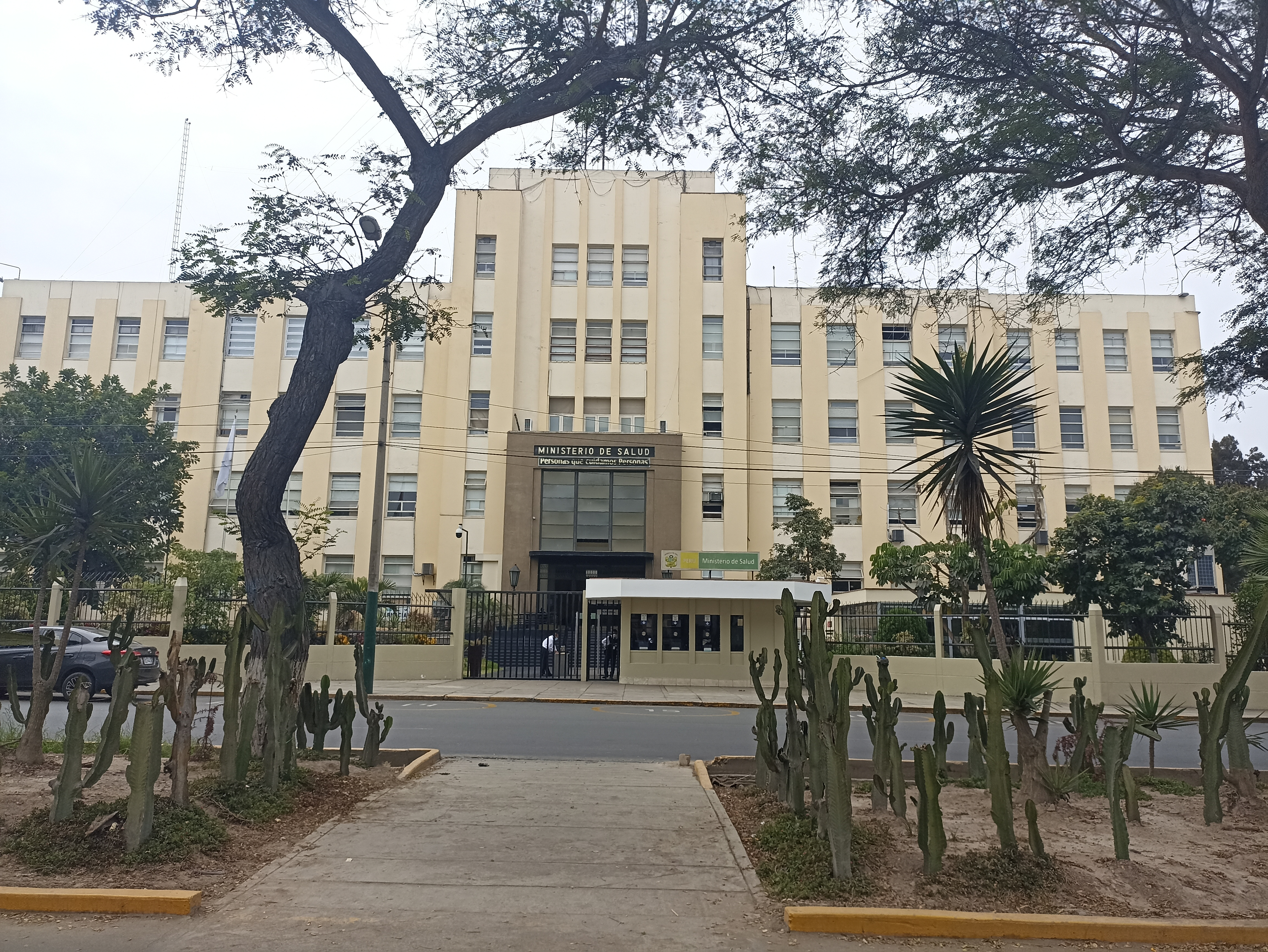

Agency overview
- Formed: 5 October 1935; 90 years ago
- Headquarters: 801 Salaverry, Jesús María, Lima
- Minister responsible: César Vásquez Sánchez
- Website: www.gob.pe/minsa

The Ministry of Health (Spanish: Ministerio de Salud, MINSA) of Peru is the government ministry in charge of the country's healthcare system.

As of 2025, the minister of Health is César Vásquez Sánchez.

== History ==
The ministry was created on October 5, 1935, through Law Decree 8124, commemorating the 50th anniversary of the death of Peruvian medical researcher Daniel Alcides Carrión. Created as the Ministry of Public Health, Works and Social Precaution (Spanish: Ministerio de Salud Pública, Trabajo y Previsión Social), it incorporated the Directorate of Public Health, and the sectors of Work, Social Precaution, and Indian Affairs, all belonging to the Ministry of Development and Public Works. It additionally assumed the functions of the Department of Philanthropy, which at the time belonged to the Ministry of Justice. The first Minister of Health was Armando Montes de Peralta.

In 1942, the ministry changed its name to the Ministry of Public Health and Social Assistance (Spanish: Ministerio de Salud Pública, Trabajo y Previsión Social). This name remained until 1968, when it adopted its current name.

In 2003, it incorporated the Medicinal Botanical Garden of Lima, created in 1991, into its National Institute of Health.

From 2020 onwards, the ministry oversaw a large part of the government's response to the COVID-19 pandemic in Peru.

== Organisation ==
- Vice Ministry of Public Health
  - Directorate-General of Public Health Policies and Regulations
  - Directorate-General of Strategic Interventions in Public Health: Directorate of Mental Health
  - Directorate-General of Health Promotion and Territorial Management
  - Directorate-General of Environmental Health and Food Safety
  - Directorate-General of Disaster Risk Management and National Health Defense
  - National Centre for Epidemiology, Disease Prevention, and Control (CDC)
  - National School of Public Health
  - Metropolitan Lima Health Directorate (DIRIS)
- Vice Ministry of Health Benefits and Insurance
  - Directorate-General of Health Benefits
  - Directorate-General of Health Insurance
  - Directorate-General of Infrastructure, Equipment, and Maintenance
  - Directorate-General of Human Resources Management and Development
  - Directorate-General of Medicines, Supplies, and Drugs (DIGEMID)
  - National Centre for the Supply of Strategic Health Resources
- General Secretariat
  - General Administration Office
  - General Resources Office Human Resources
  - General Office of Information Technology
  - General Office of Communications
  - General Office of Transparency and Document Processing
  - General Office of Planning, Budget, and Modernisation
  - General Office of Coordination and Coordination
  - General Office of Legal Counsel
  - General Office of Cooperation and International Affairs
- Public Organisations and Programmes
  - Institute for Health Services Management
  - National Health Investment Programme
- National Health Council

Entities administered by the ministry include:

- National Institute of Neoplastic Diseases (INEN)
- National Institute of Health (INS)
- National Institute of Child Health (INSN)
- National Superintendency of Health (SUSALUD)
- Comprehensive Health Insurance (SIS)
- Intangible Solidarity Health Fund (FISSAL)
- National Health Investment Programme (PRONIS)
- Program for the Creation of Integrated Health Networks (PCRIS)

== List of ministers ==
Name	Party	Period	
Name	Party	Term start	Term end
Ministers of Public Health, Works and Social Precaution (1935–1942)
Armando Montes de Peralta	—	October 9, 1935	April 12, 1936
Fortunato Quesada Larrea	—	April 13, 1936	September 23, 1936
Roque Augusto Saldías Maninat	—	September 24, 1936	November 2, 1937
Rafael Escardó	—	November 3, 1937	April 19, 1938
Guillermo Almenara Irigoyen	—	April 30, 1938	December 7, 1939
Ministers of Public Health and Social Assistance (1942–1968)
Constantino J. Carvallo	—	December 8, 1939	August 27, 1945
Óscar Trelles Montes	—	August 28, 1945	January 22, 1946
Julio Ernesto Portugal	—	January 23, 1946	January 11, 1947
Alberto Hurtado Abadía	—	January 12, 1947	October 30, 1947
Manuel R. Nieto	—	October 31, 1947	February 28, 1948
Arturo Jiménez Pacheco	—	March 1, 1948	June 17, 1948
Alberto Hurtado Abadía	—	June 18, 1948	October 27, 1948
Alberto López Flores	—	October 31, 1948	June 27, 1950
Edgardo Rebagliati Martins	—	June 28, 1950	August 4, 1952
Luis N. Sáenz	—	August 5, 1952	August 9, 1954
Armando Montes de Peralta	—	August 10, 1954	September 14, 1955
Jorge de Romaña Plazolles	—	September 15, 1955	December 5, 1955
Alberto López Flores	—	December 5, 1955	July 27, 1956
Jorge Haaker Fort	—	July 28, 1956	September 23, 1957
Francisco Sánchez-Moreno Moscoso	—	September 24, 1957	June 19, 1959
Guillermo Garrido-Lecca Frías	—	June 20, 1959	June 6, 1960
Rodrigo Franco Guerra	—	June 10, 1960	February 18, 1961
Eduardo Watson Cisneros	—	February 19, 1961	July 18, 1962
Víctor Solano Castro	—	July 18, 1962	July 28, 1963
Javier Arias Stella	Popular Action	July 28, 1963	September 15, 1965
Daniel Becerra de la Flor	Popular Action	September 16, 1965	September 7, 1967
Javier Arias Stella	Popular Action	September 9, 1967	October 2, 1968
Javier Correa Miller	Popular Action	October 2, 1968	October 3, 1968
Ministers of Health
Eduardo Montero Rojas	—	October 10, 1968	December 30, 1969
Rolando Caro Constantini	—	December 31, 1969	April 27, 1971
Fernando Miró Quesada Bahamonde	—	April 28, 1971; August 28, 1975	August 28, 1975; October 18, 1975
Jorge Tamayo de la Flor	—	October 18, 1975	December 31, 1976
Humberto Campodónico Hoyos	—	January 1, 1977	December 31, 1977
Óscar Dávila Zumaeta	—	January 1, 1978	September 15, 1978
Eduardo Rivasplata Hurtado	—	September 18, 1978	July 27, 1980
Uriel García Cáceres	Popular Action	July 27, 1980	March 2, 1982
Juan Franco Ponce	Popular Action	March 3, 1982	February 28, 1985
Carlos Bazán Zender	Popular Action	March 1, 1985	July 28, 1985
David Tejada de Rivero	APRA	July 28, 1985	June 29, 1987
Ilda Urízar Peroni	APRA	June 29, 1987	March 15, 1988
Luis Pinillos Ashton	—N/a	March 15, 1988	May 12, 1989
David Tejada de Rivero	APRA	May 12, 1989	October 3, 1989
Paul Caro Gamarra	APRA	October 3, 1989	July 27, 1990
Carlos Vidal Layseca	—N/a	July 28, 1990	February 18, 1991
Víctor Yamamoto Miyakawa	Cambio 90	February 18, 1991	November 6, 1991
Víctor Paredes Guerra	Cambio 90	November 6, 1991	August 28, 1993
Jaime Freundt-Thurne Oyanguren	Cambio 90	August 28, 1993	October 7, 1994
Eduardo Yong Motta	—	October 10, 1994	April 3, 1996
Marino Costa Bauer	—	April 10, 1996	January 5, 1999
Carlos de Romaña y García	—	January 5, 1999	April 14, 1999
Alejandro Aguinaga Recuenco	New Majority	April 15, 1999	November 25, 2000
Eduardo Pretell Zárate	Popular Action	November 25, 2000	July 28, 2001
Luis Solari de la Fuente	Possible Peru	July 28, 2001	January 18, 2002
Fernando Carbone Campoverde	—	January 21, 2002	June 28, 2003
Álvaro Vidal Rivadeneyra	—	June 28, 2003	February 16, 2004
Pilar Mazzetti Soler	—	February 16, 2004	July 28, 2006
Carlos Vallejos Sologuren	APRA	July 29, 2006	December 20, 2007
Hernán Garrido-Lecca Montañez	APRA	December 20, 2007	October 14, 2008
Óscar Ugarte Ubilluz	Peruvian Humanist Party	October 14, 2008	July 28, 2011
Alberto Tejada Noriega	—	July 28, 2011	July 23, 2012
Midori de Habich Rospigliosi	—	July 23, 2012	November 5, 2014
Aníbal Velásquez Valdivia	—	November 5, 2014	July 28, 2016
Patricia García Funegra	—	July 28, 2016	September 17, 2017
Fernando d'Alessio Ipinza	—	September 17, 2017	January 9, 2018
Abel Salinas Rivas	APRA	January 9, 2018	April 2, 2018
Silvia Pessah Eljay	—	April 2, 2018	January 5, 2019
Zulema Tomás Gonzales	—	January 7, 2019	November 15, 2019
Elizabeth Hinostroza Pereyra	—	November 18, 2019	March 20, 2020
Víctor Zamora Mesía	Broad Front	March 20, 2020	July 15, 2020
Pilar Mazzetti Soler	—N/a	July 15, 2020	November 10, 2020
Abel Salinas Rivas	APRA	November 11, 2020	November 15, 2020
Pilar Mazzetti Soler	—N/a	November 18, 2020	February 12, 2021
Óscar Ugarte Ubilluz	Together for Peru	February 13, 2021	July 28, 2021
Hernando Cevallos Flores	Broad Front	July 29, 2021	February 8, 2022
Hernán Condori Machado	Free Peru	February 8, 2022	March 31, 2022
Jorge López Peña	—N/a	April 7, 2022	October 23, 2022
Kelly Portalatino	Free Peru	October 27, 2022	December 7, 2022
Rosa Gutiérrez Palomino	—N/a	December 10, 2022	June 15, 2023
César Vásquez Sánchez	Alliance for Progress	June 19, 2023	October 10, 2025
Luis Quiroz Avilés	—N/a	October 14, 2025	Incumbent

== See also ==
- Healthcare in Peru
- List of hospitals in Peru
