= Medicinal Botanical Garden of Lima =

Botanical garden in Lima, Peru

Medicinal Botanical Garden
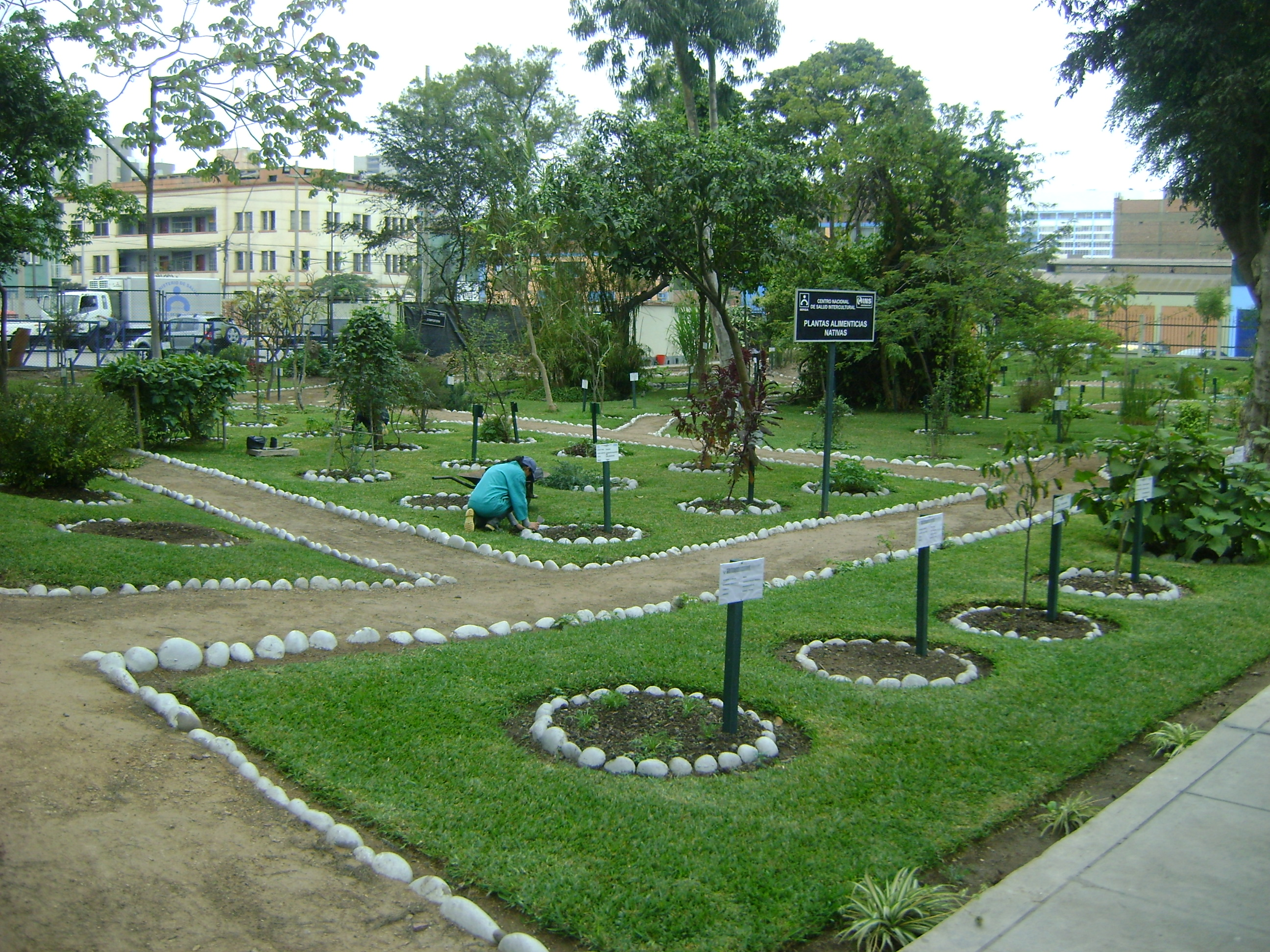
- Interactive map of Medicinal Botanical Garden
- Location: Lima, Peru
- Coordinates: 12°4′25″S 77°2′29″W
- Operator: CENSI

The Medicinal Botanical Garden of Lima (Spanish: Jardín botánico de Plantas Medicinales de Lima) is a botanical garden for medicinal plants in Jesús María District, Lima, Peru. It is located next to the headquarters of the Ministry of Health, with another garden located at Chorrillos District.

== History ==
It was created by the Institute of Traditional Medicine (IMET), then under the leadership of José Aranda Ventura. Currently operated by CENSI, a government body under the Ministry of Health, it contains over 600 different types of medicinal plants. These plants are then used by the Ministry in its treatments of different diseases.

== Gallery ==
Map of the garden

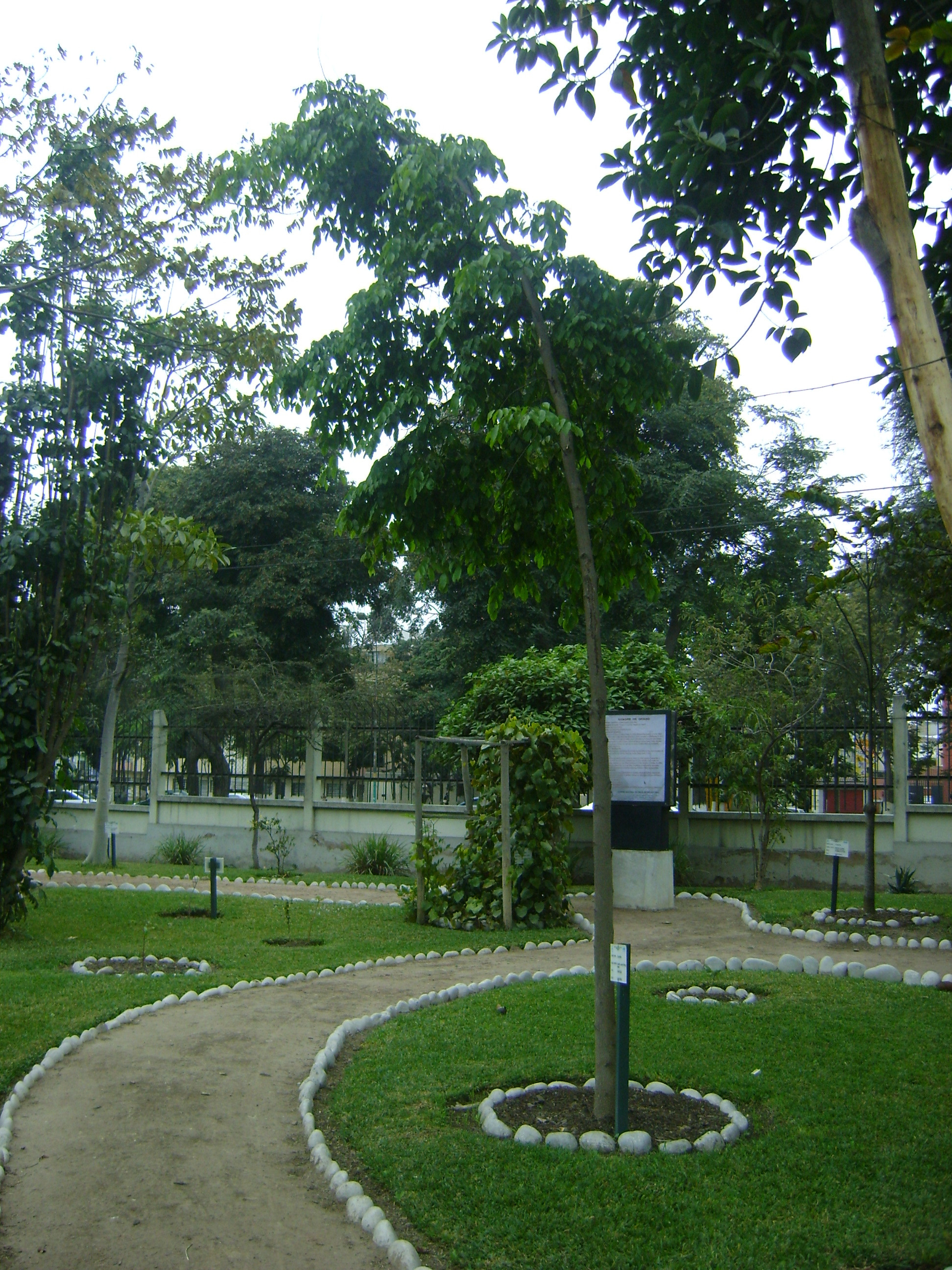
Copaiba tree

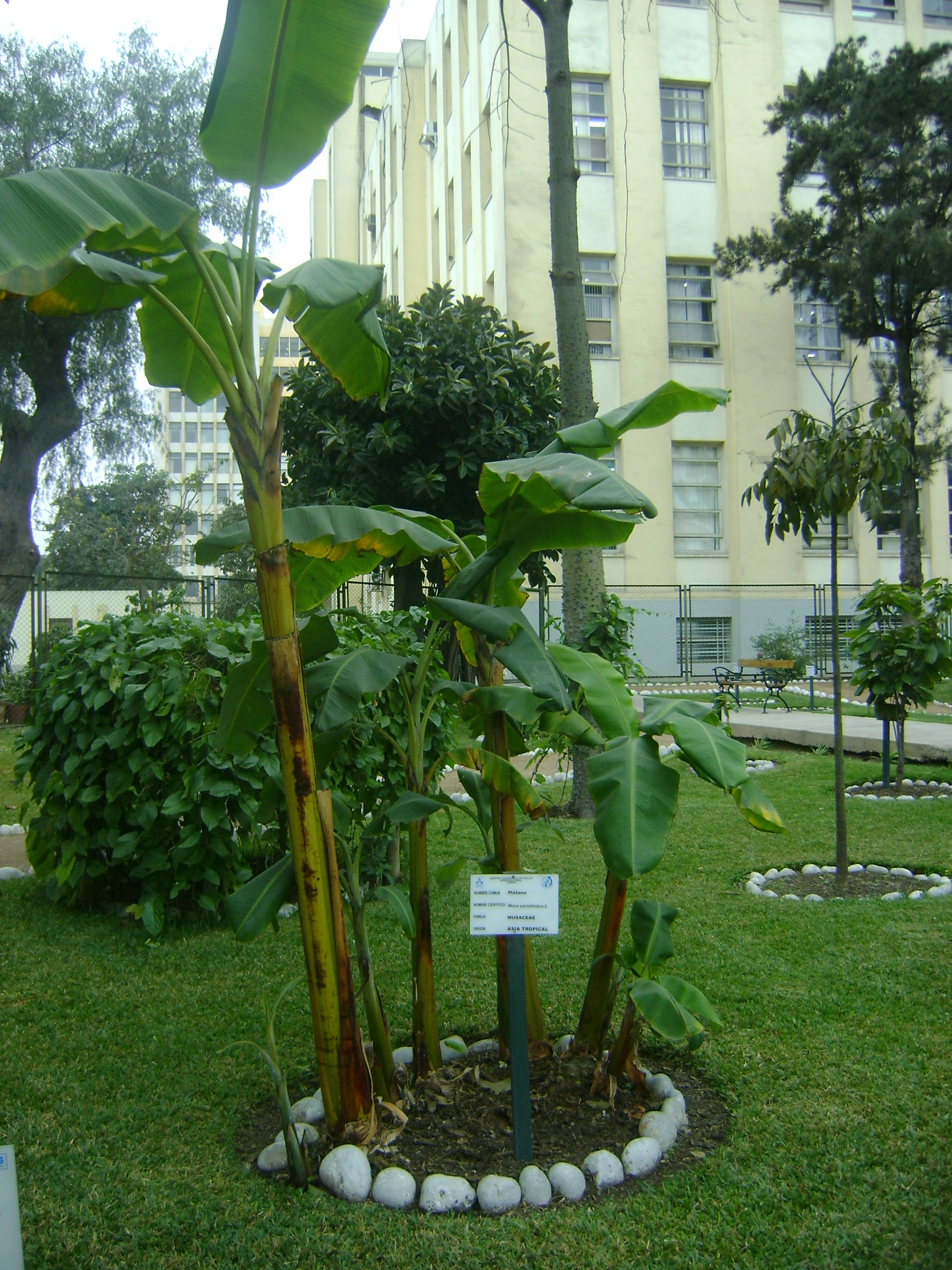
Banana

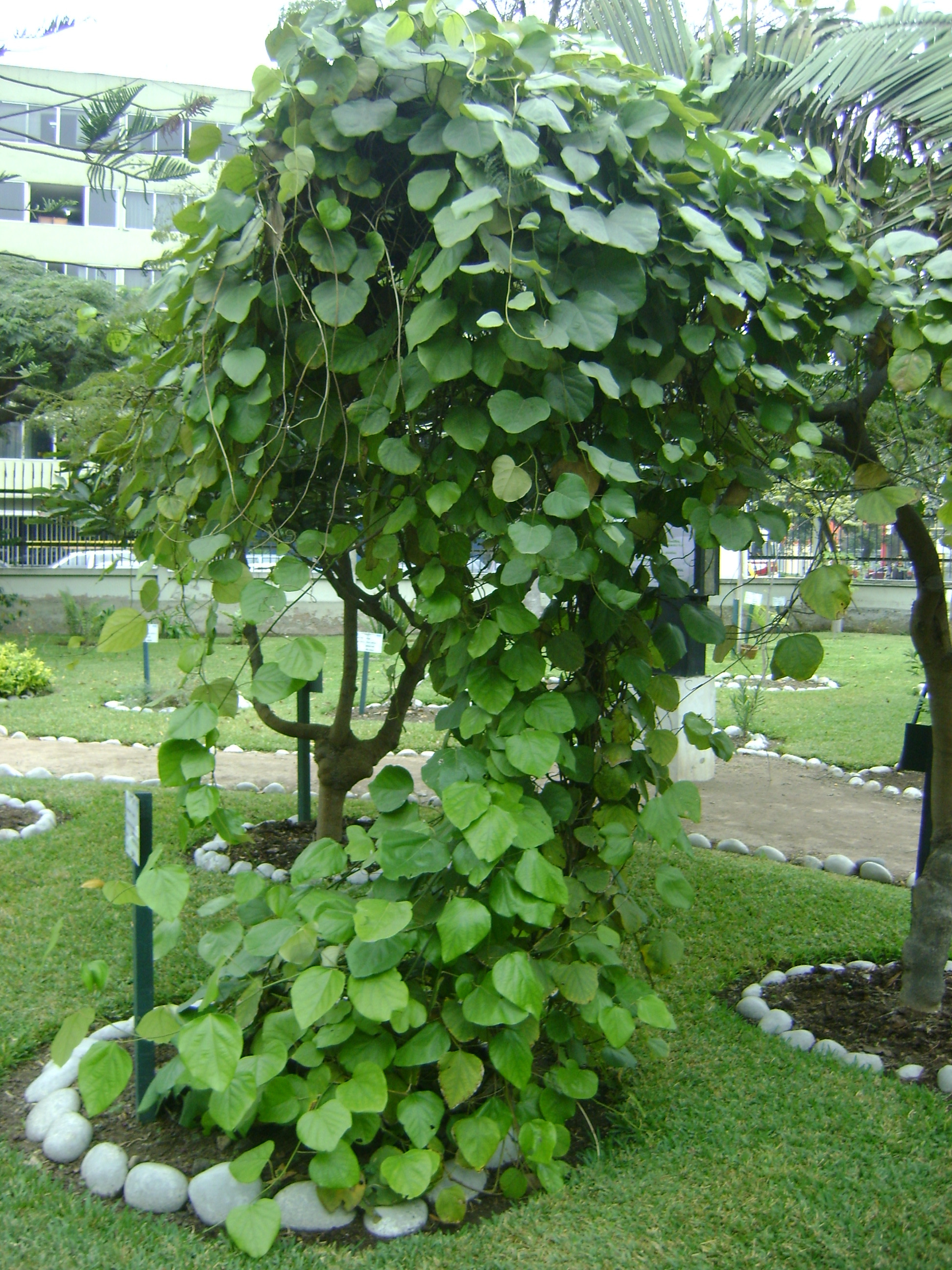
Curare plant

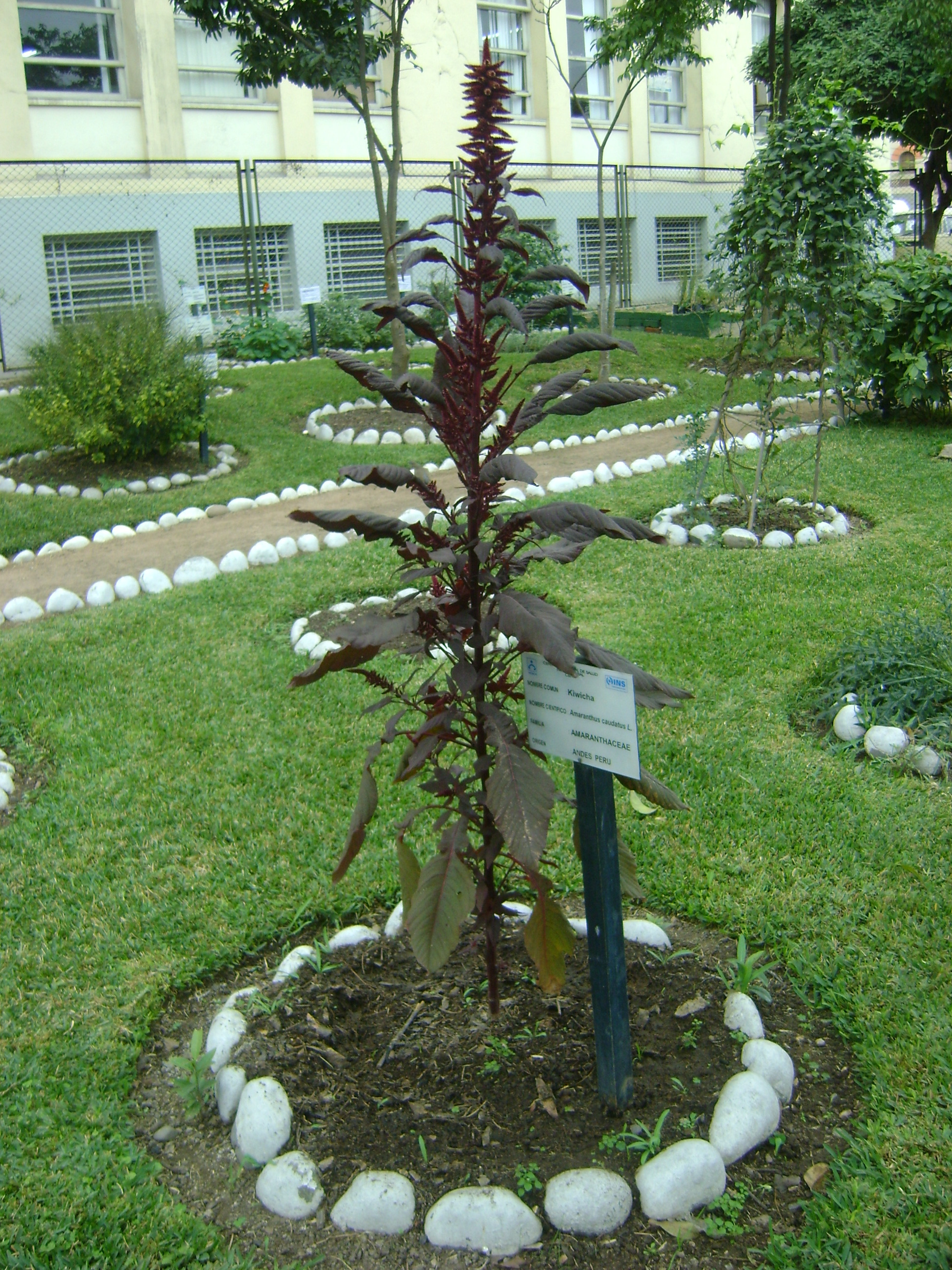
Kiwicha

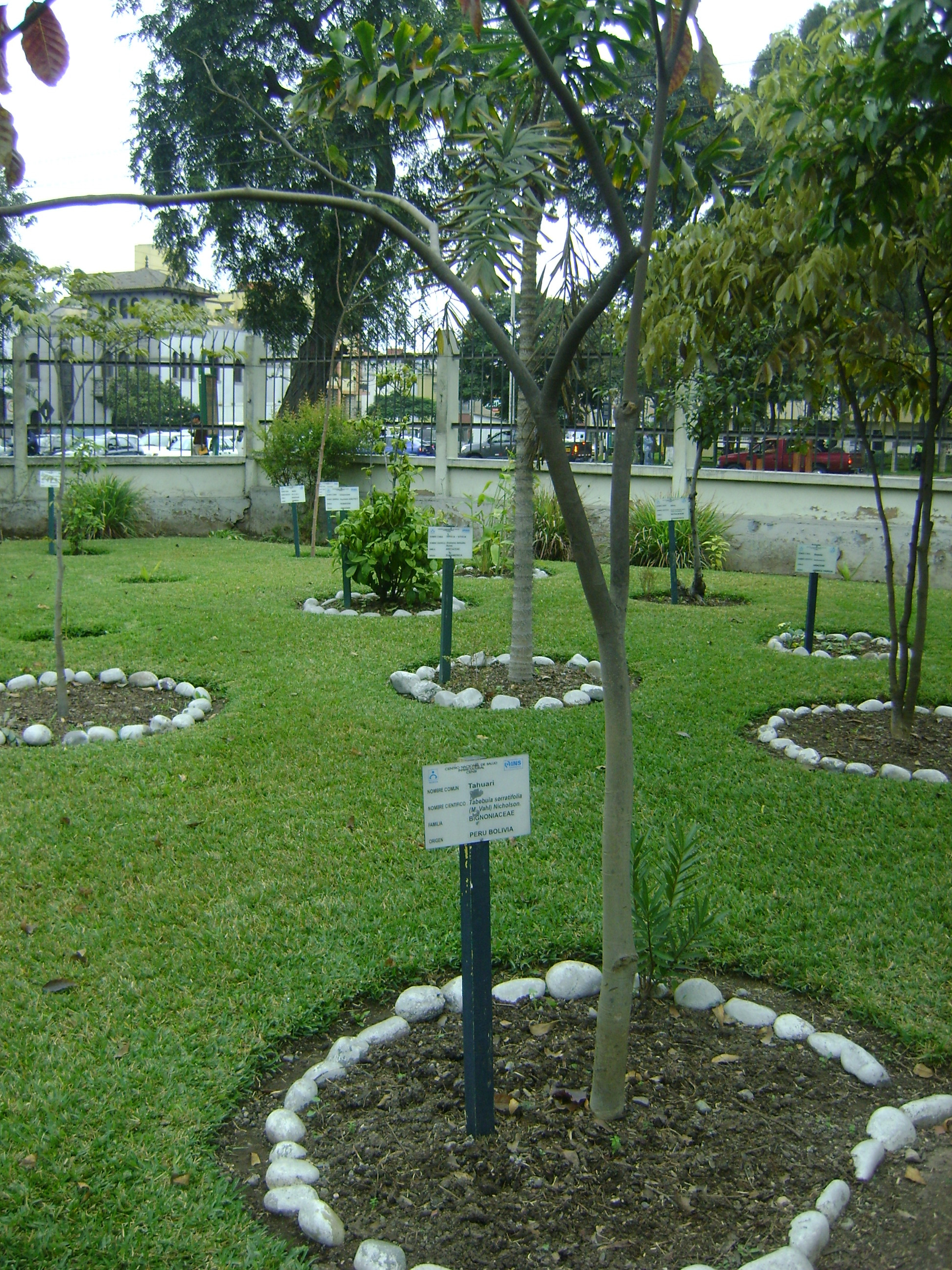
Tahuari

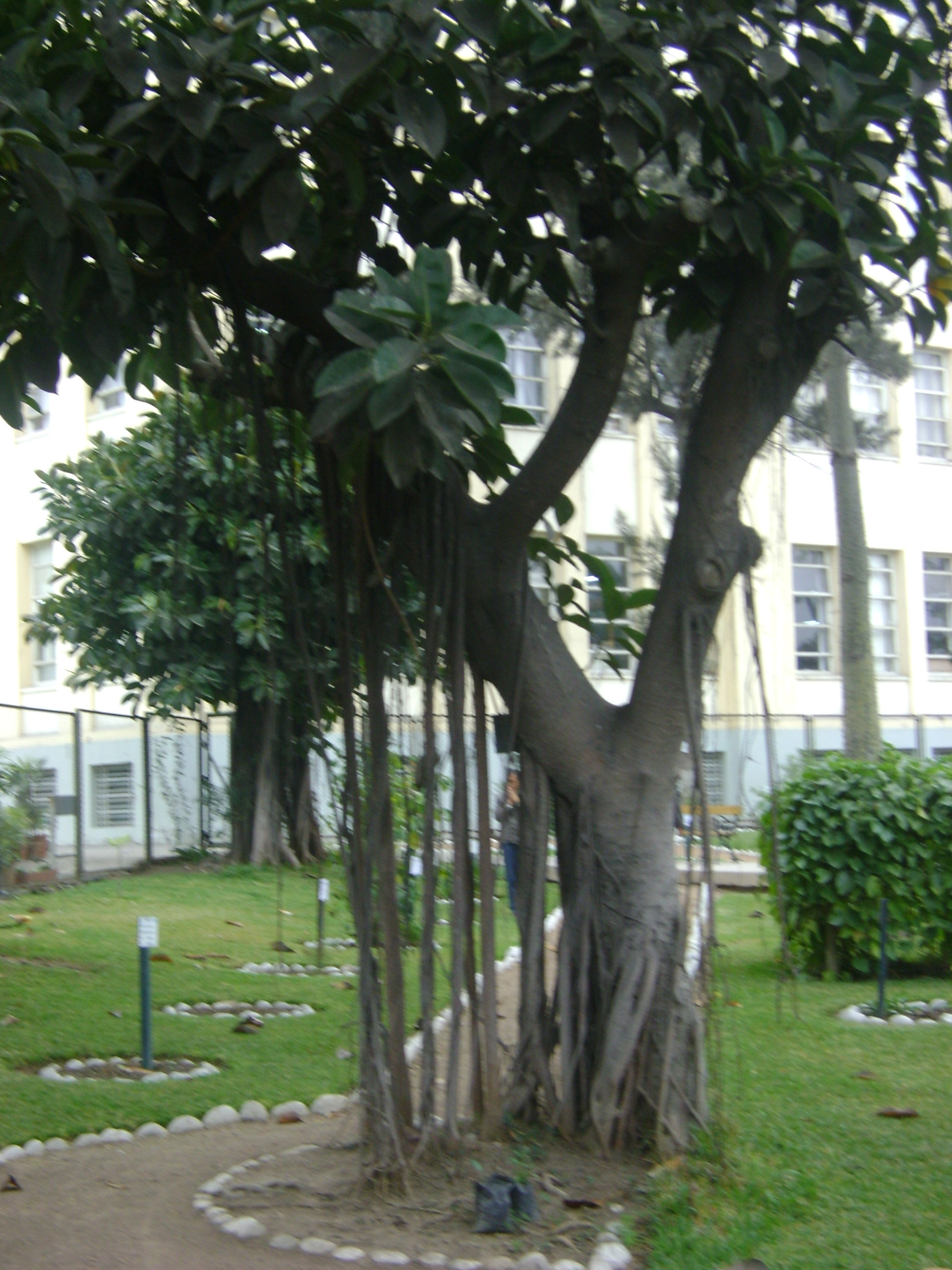
Rubber tree

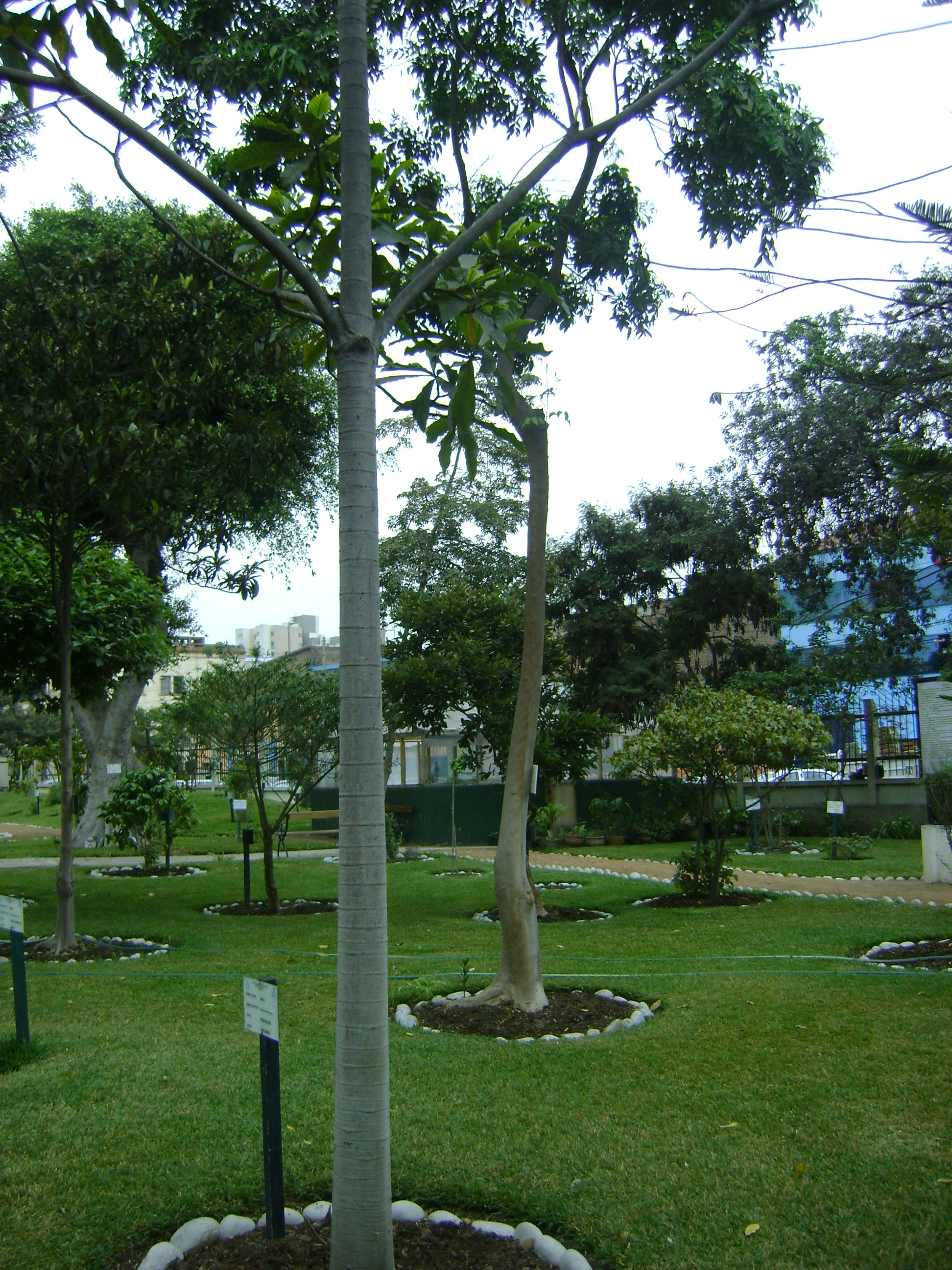
Huito tree

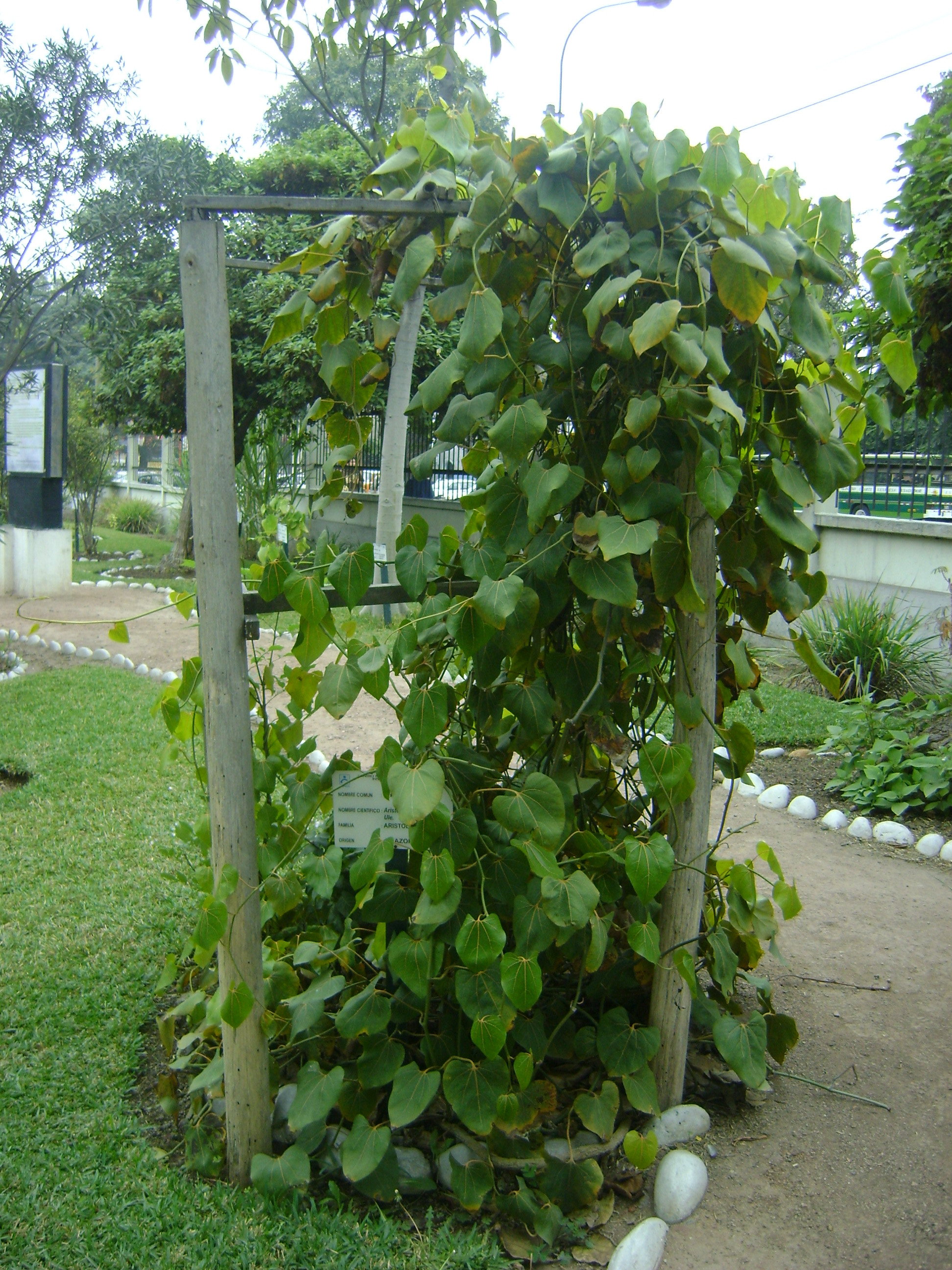
Omagua, possibly Aristolochia bicolor

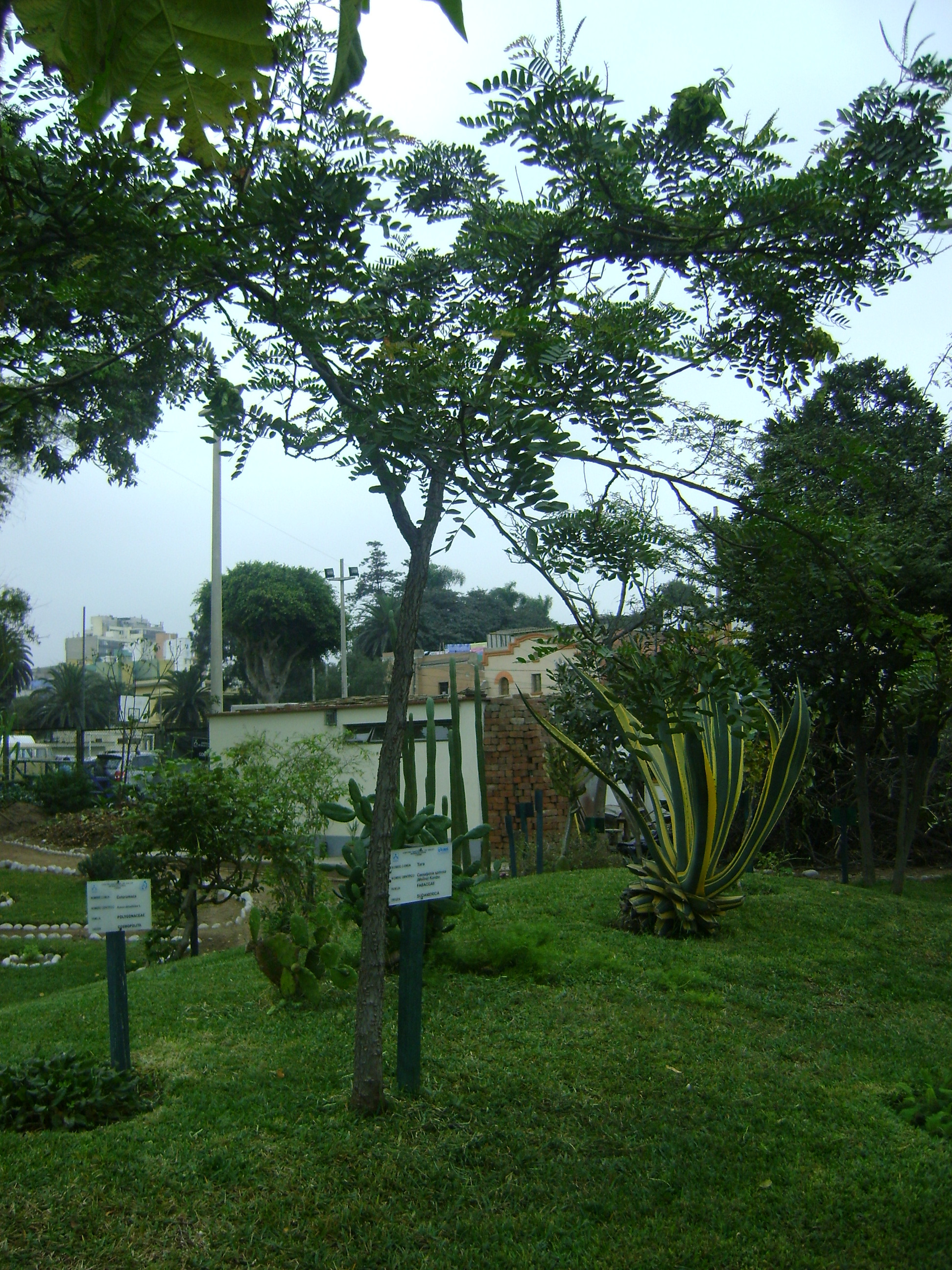
Tara spinosa

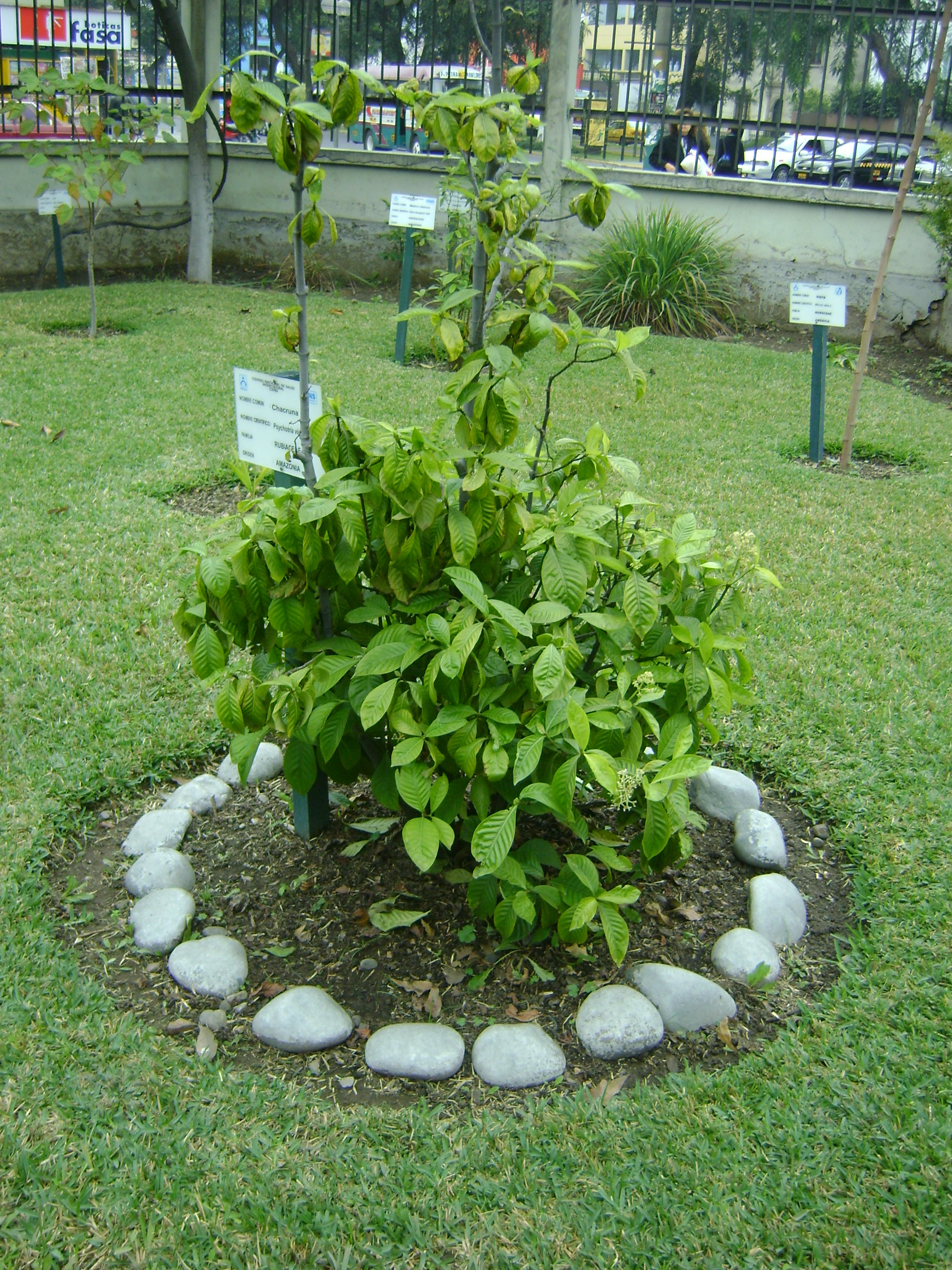
Chacruna

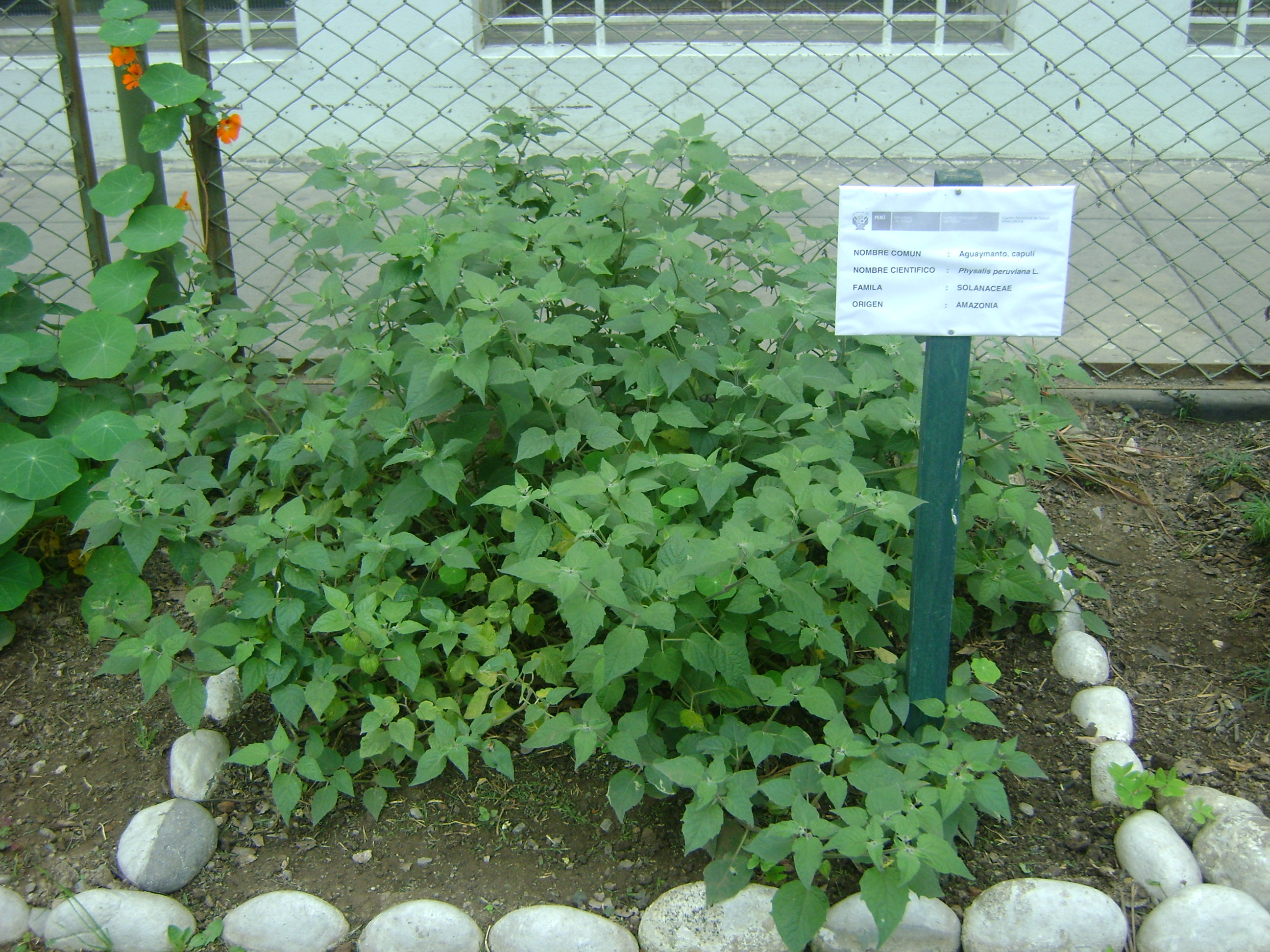
Aguaymanto

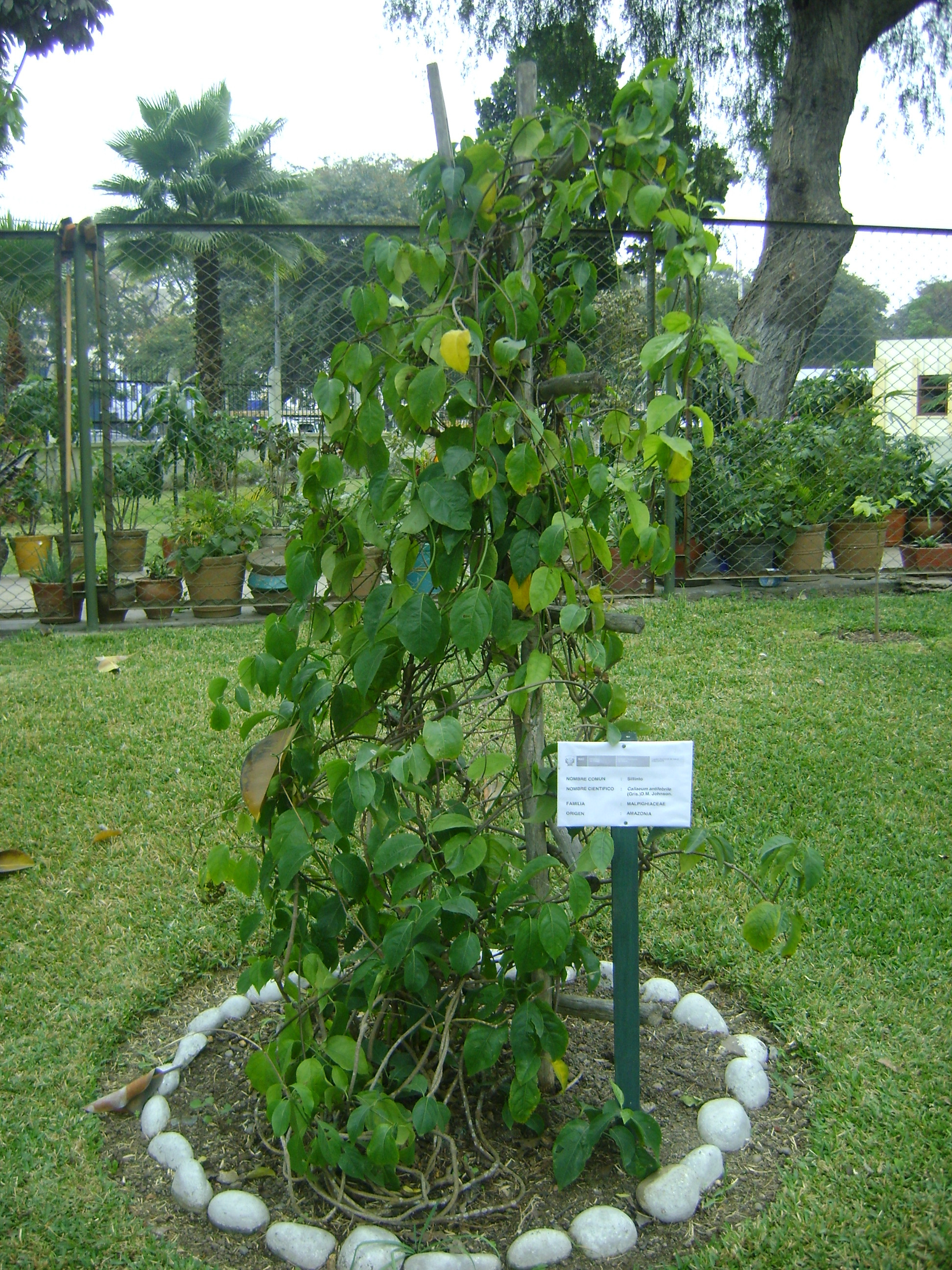
Sillinto

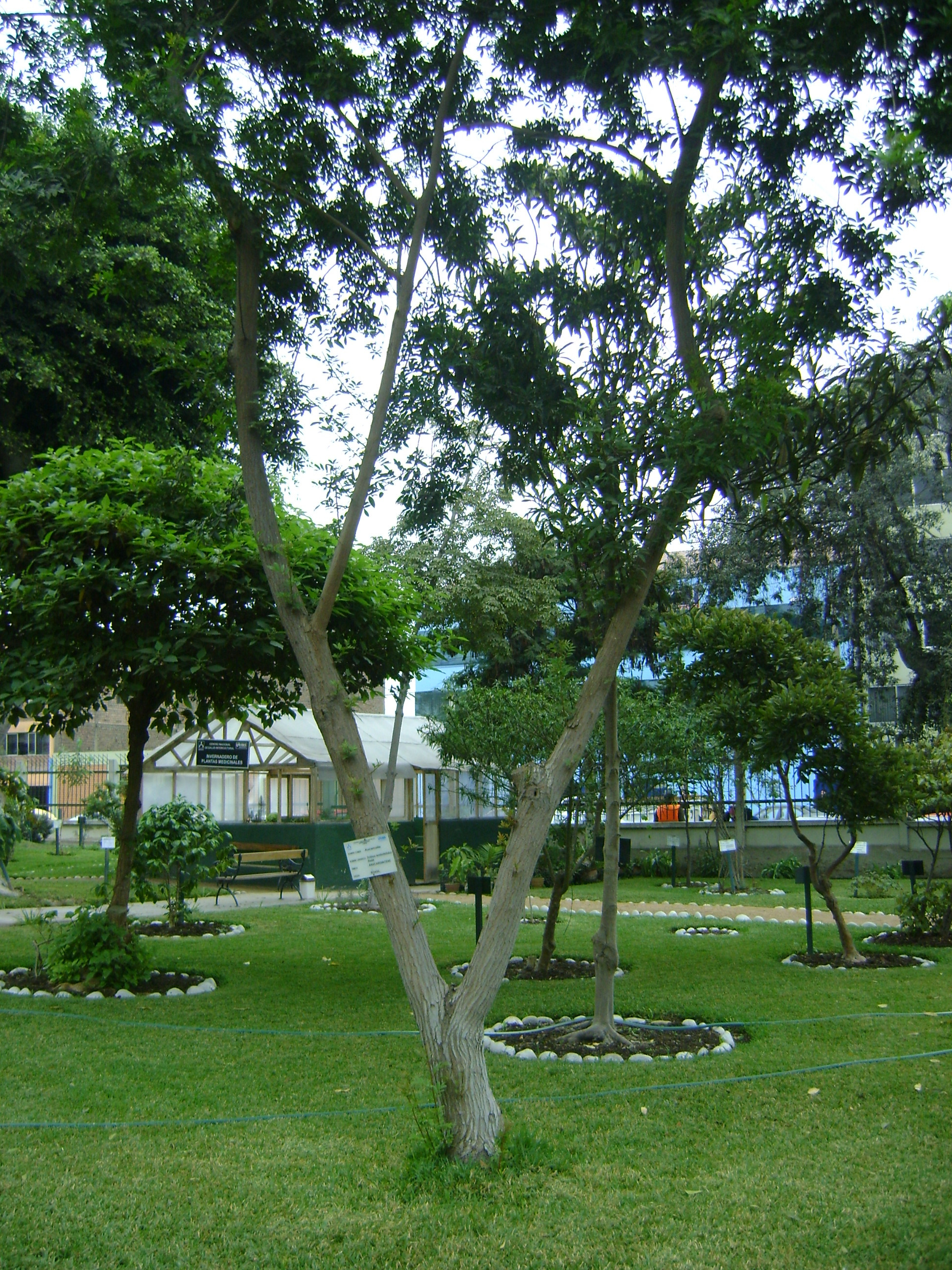
Aucamolle tree

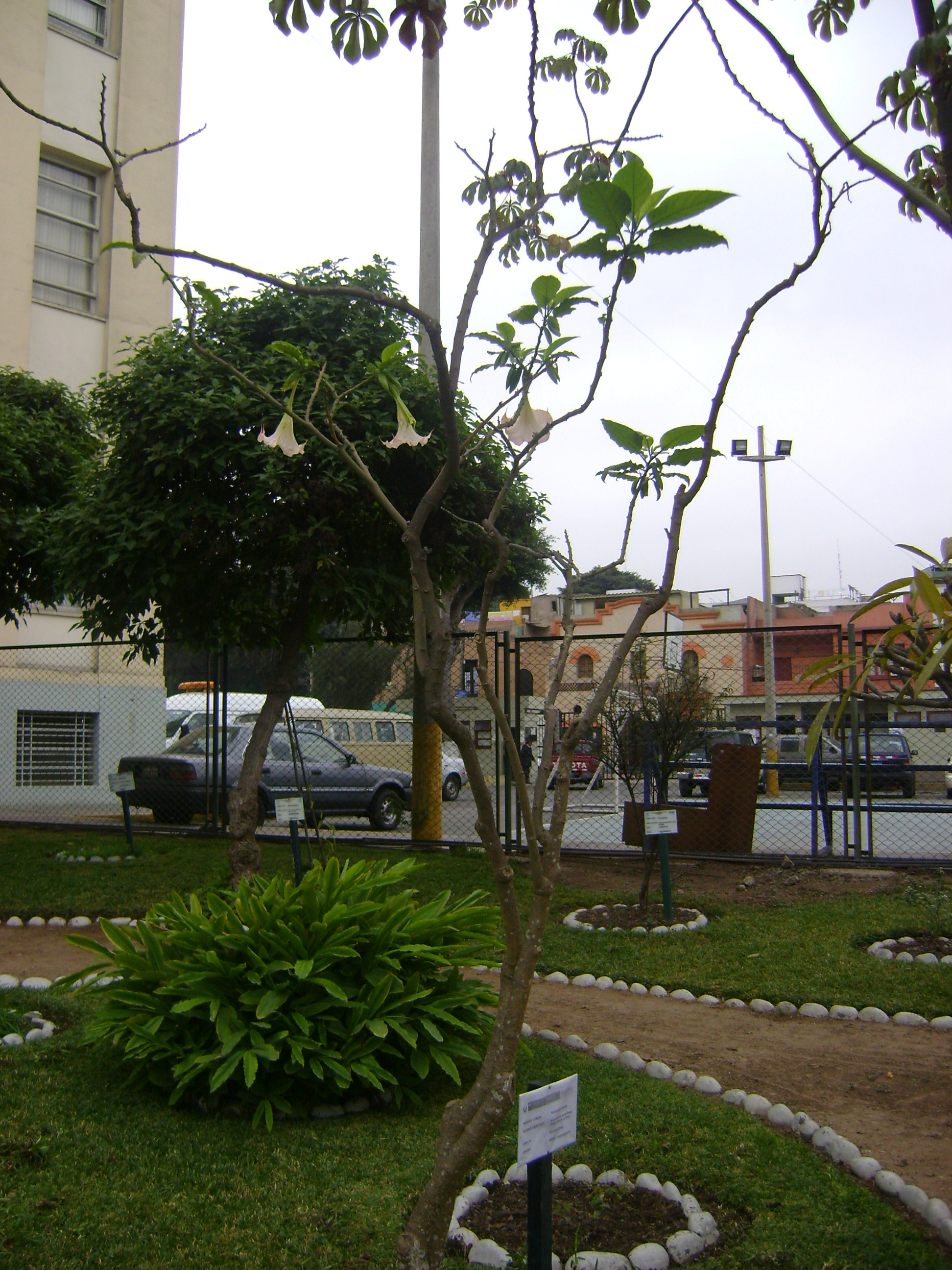
Brugmansia arborea

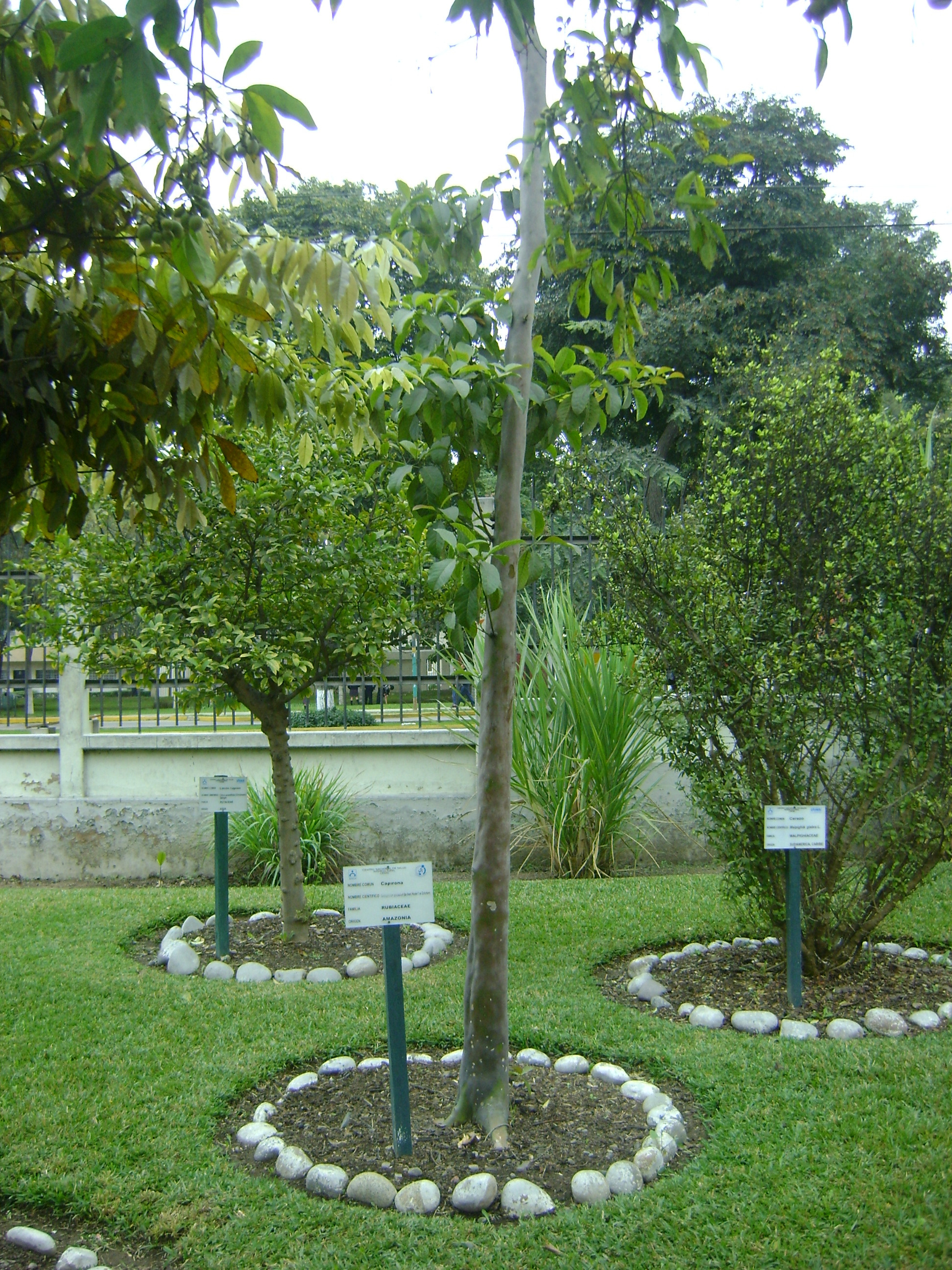
Capirona tree

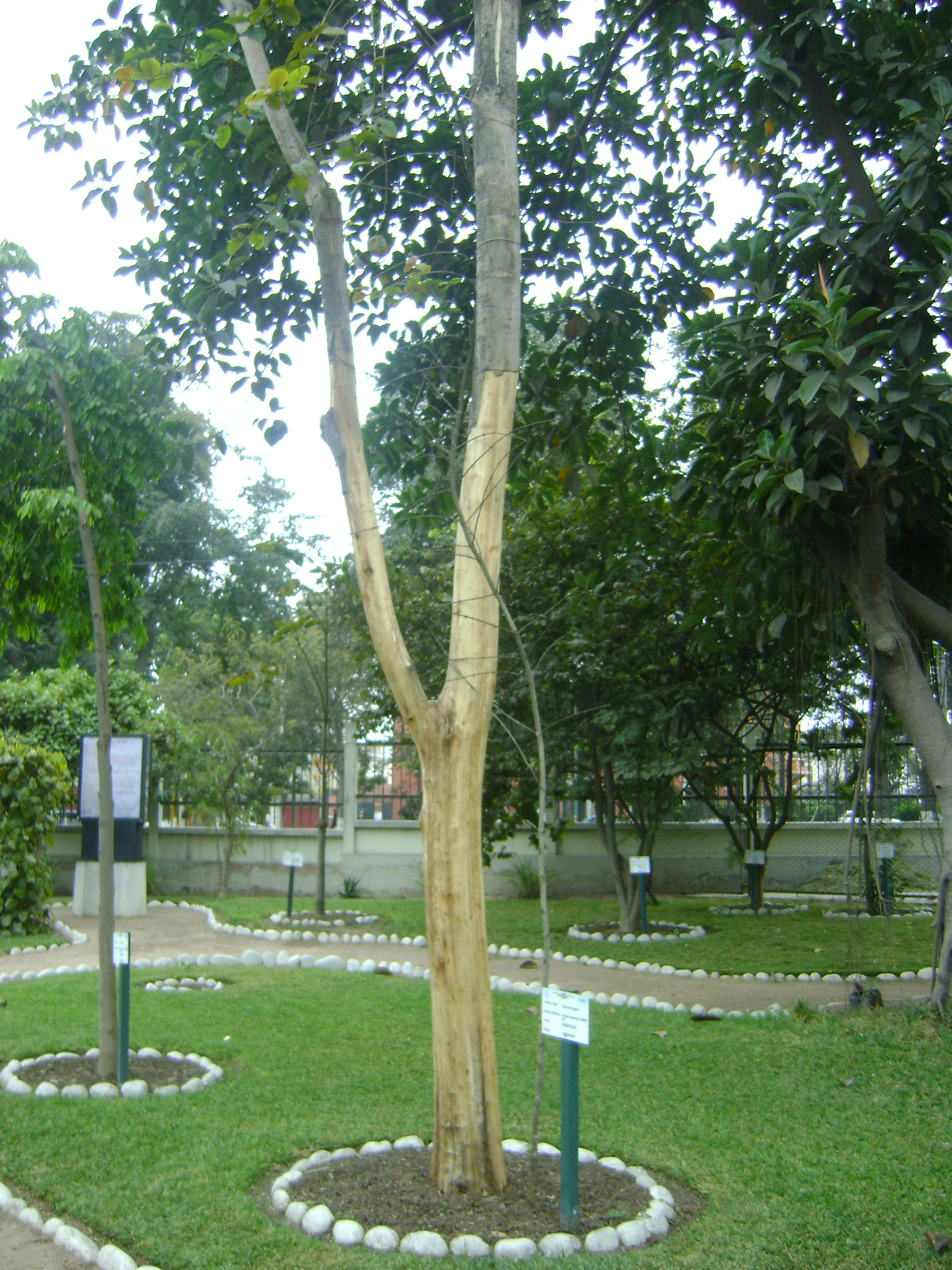
Uncaria tomentosa

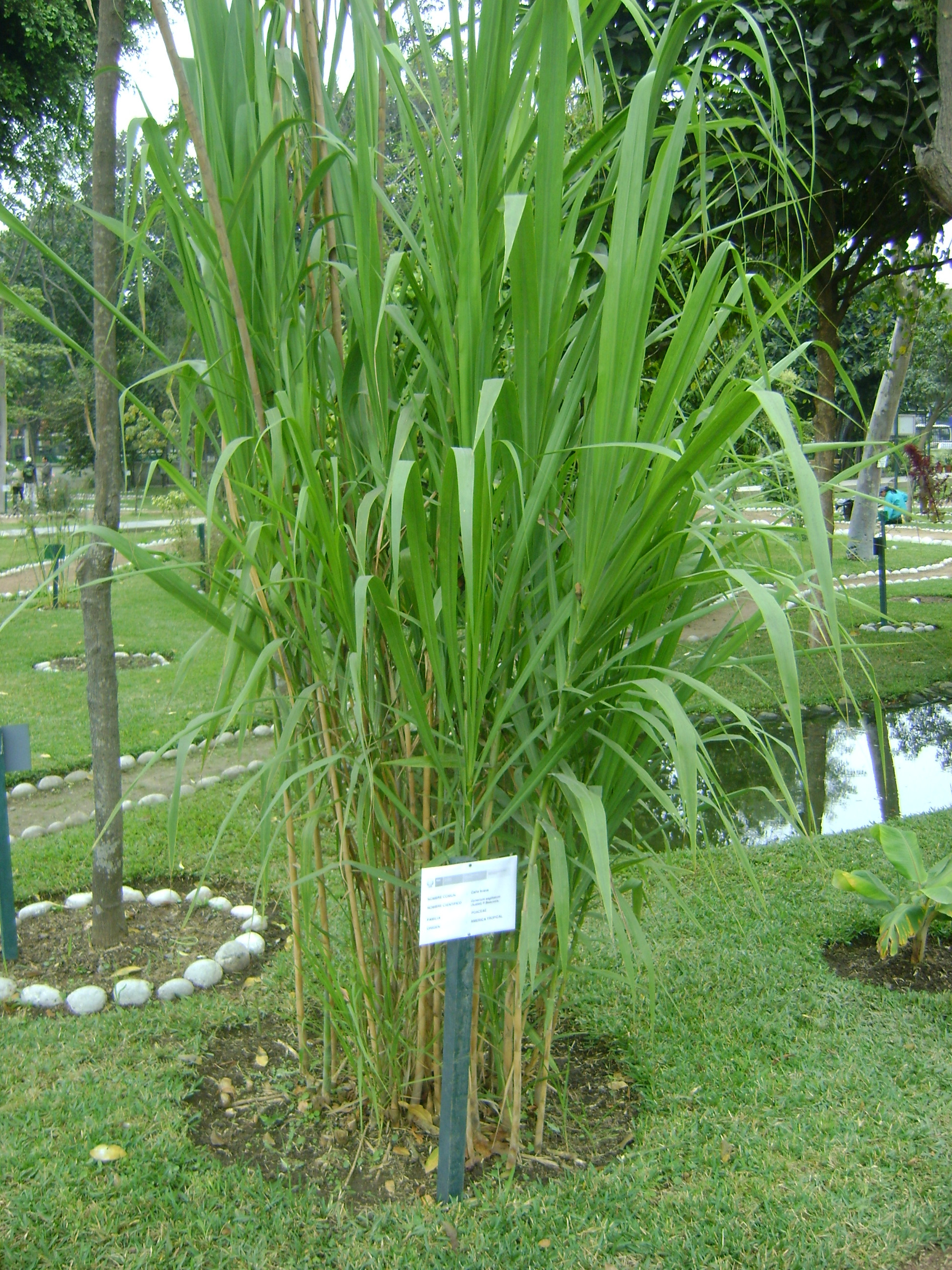
Arundo donax

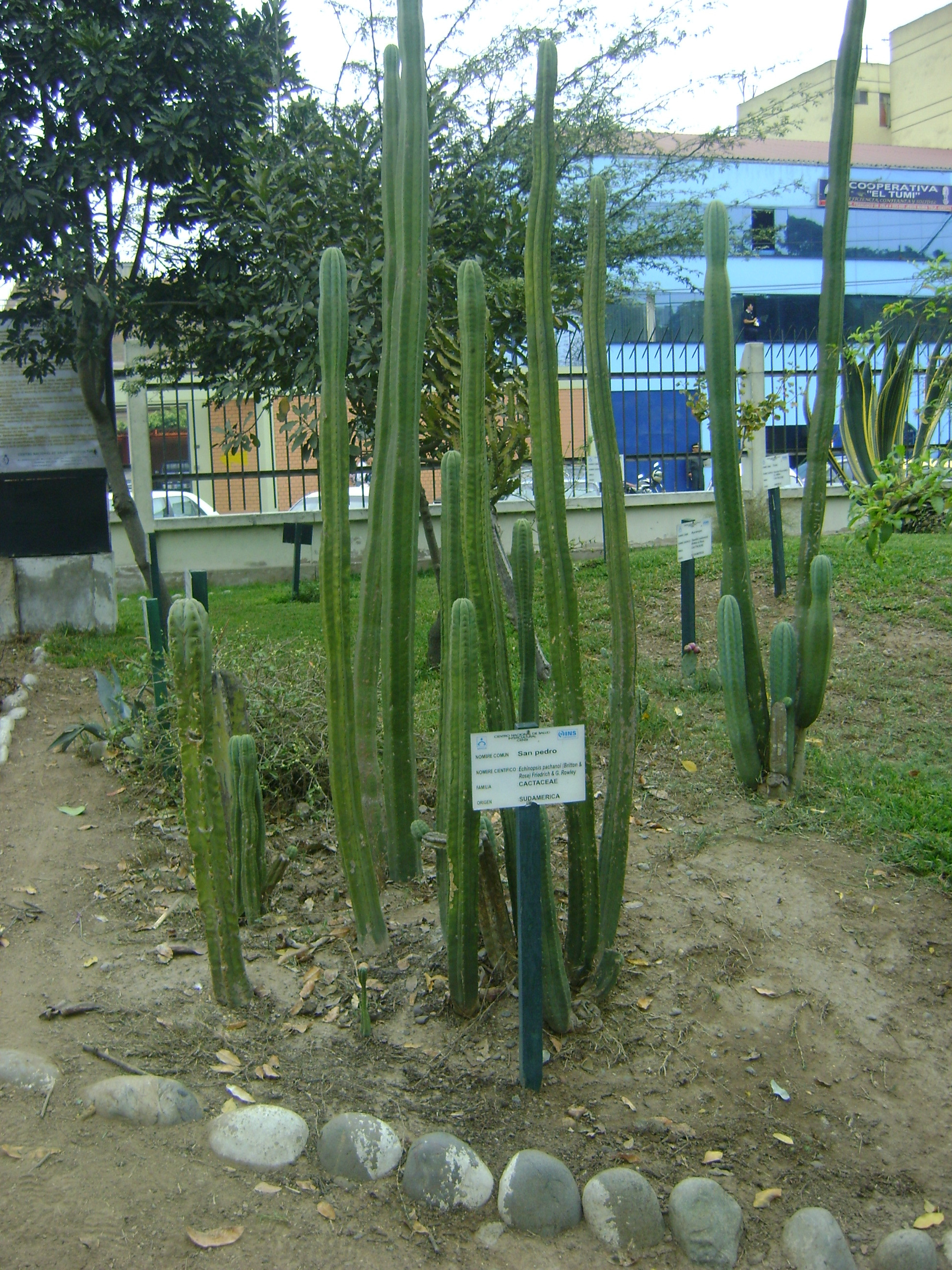
Echinopsis pachanoi

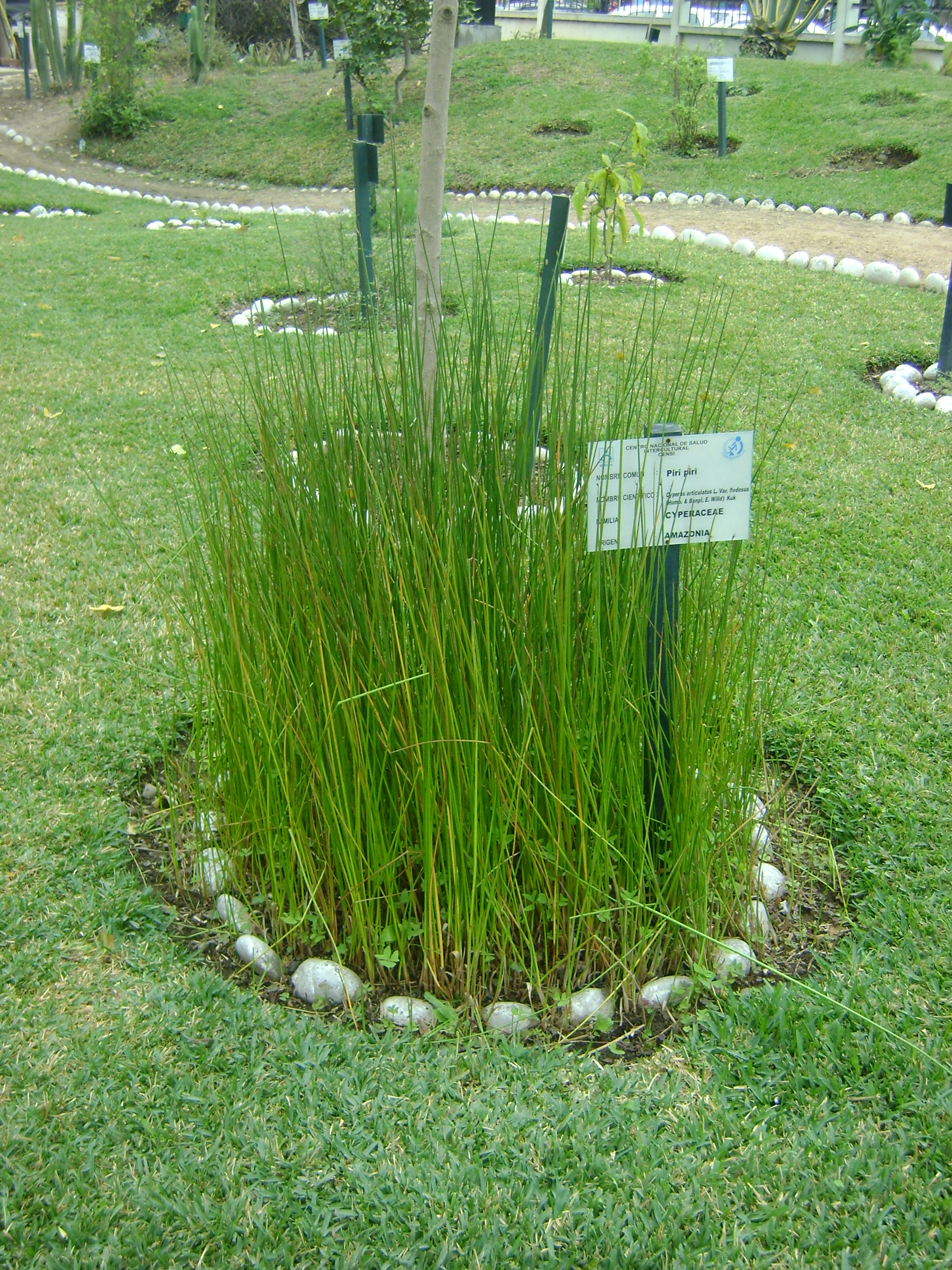
Cyperus giganteus

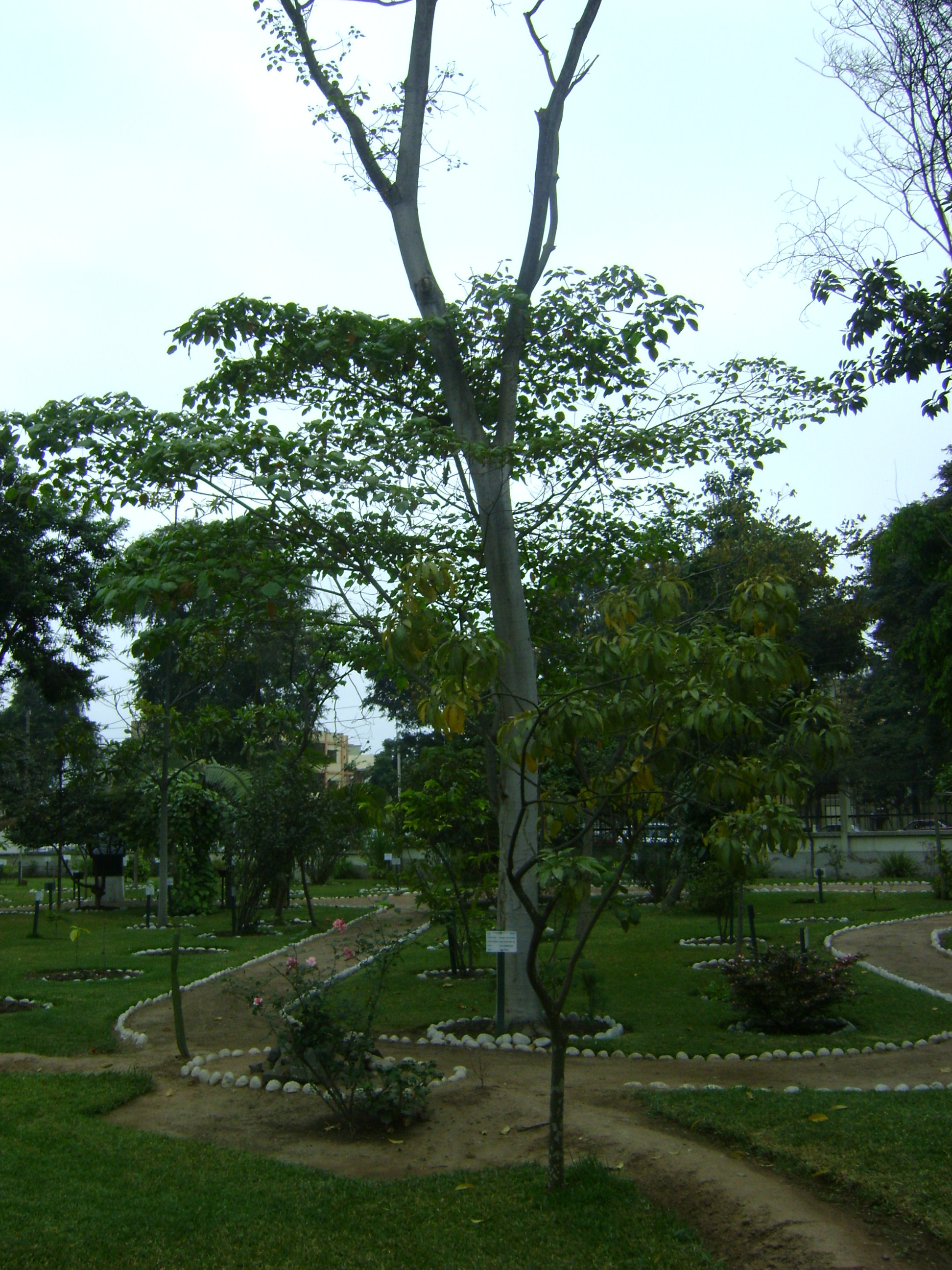
Dragon's blood tree

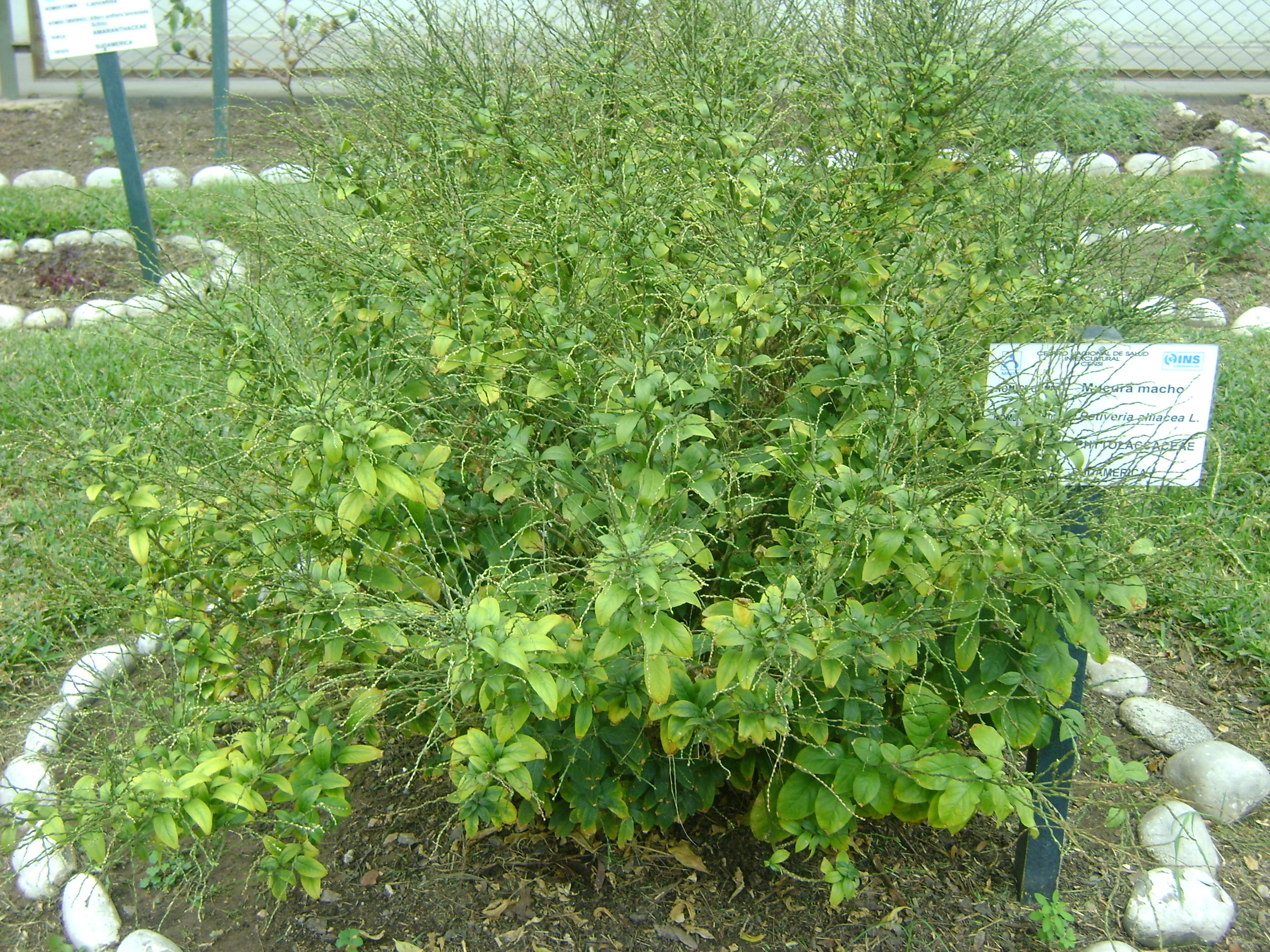
Petiveria alliacea

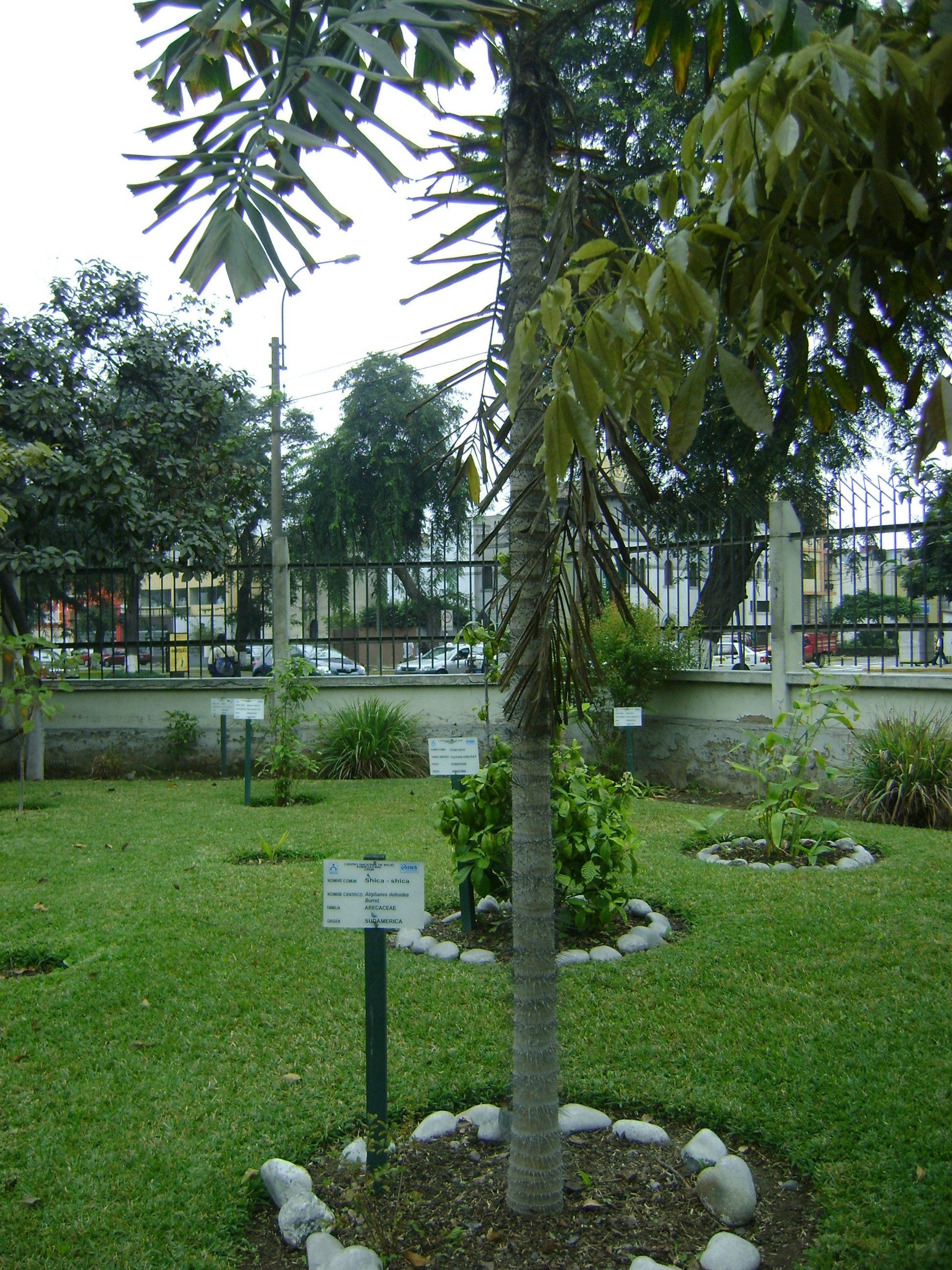
Shica Shica palm
