= César Vásquez Sánchez =

Peruvian politician (born 1975)

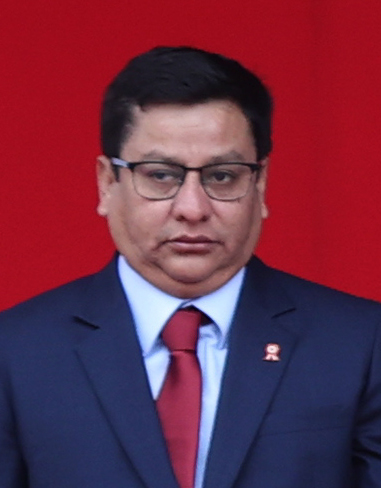
- Vásquez Sánchez in 2023

Minister of Health
- In office 19 June 2023 – 10 October 2025
- President: Dina Boluarte
- Prime Minister: Alberto Otárola; Gustavo Adrianzén; Eduardo Arana Ysa
- Preceded by: Rosa Gutiérrez
- Succeeded by: Luis Quiroz Avilés

Member of Congress
- In office 26 July 2016 – 30 september 2019
- Constituency: Cajamarca

Personal details
- Born: 27 July 1975 (age 51)
- Party: Alliance for Progress (since 2017)

César Henry Vásquez Sánchez (born 27 July 1975) is a Peruvian politician serving as minister of health since 2023. From 2016 to 2019, he was a member of the Congress of the Republic.
