= Hernán Condori =

Peruvian doctor and politician

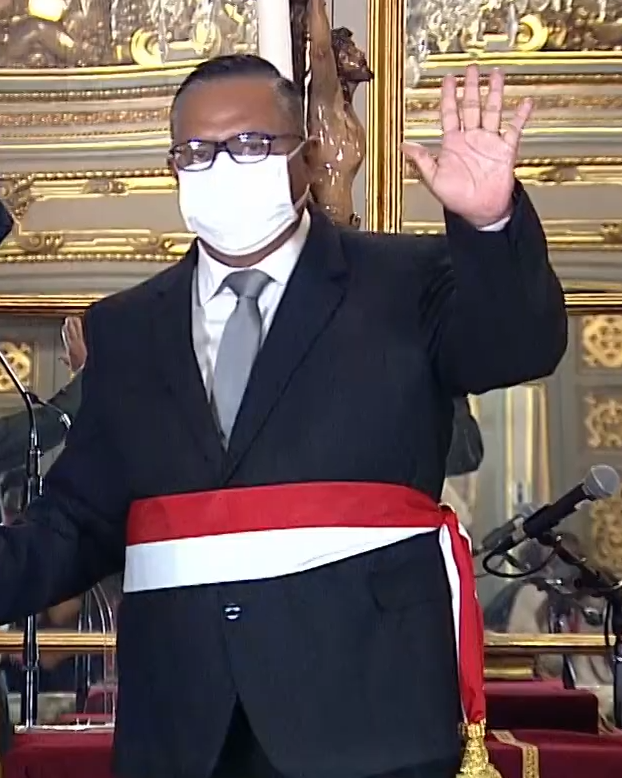

Minister of Health
- In office 8 February 2022 – 3 April 2022
- President: Pedro Castillo
- Prime Minister: Aníbal Torres
- Preceded by: Hernando Cevallos
- Succeeded by: Jorge López Peña

Personal details
- Born: Hernán Yury Condori Machado; 22 December 1966 (age 59) Santiago, Cusco, Peru
- Party: Free Peru
- Education: Federico Villarreal National University
- Profession: Doctor

Hernán Yury Condori Machado (born 22 December 1966) is a Peruvian doctor and former Minister of Health of Peru.
