= Healthcare in Peru =

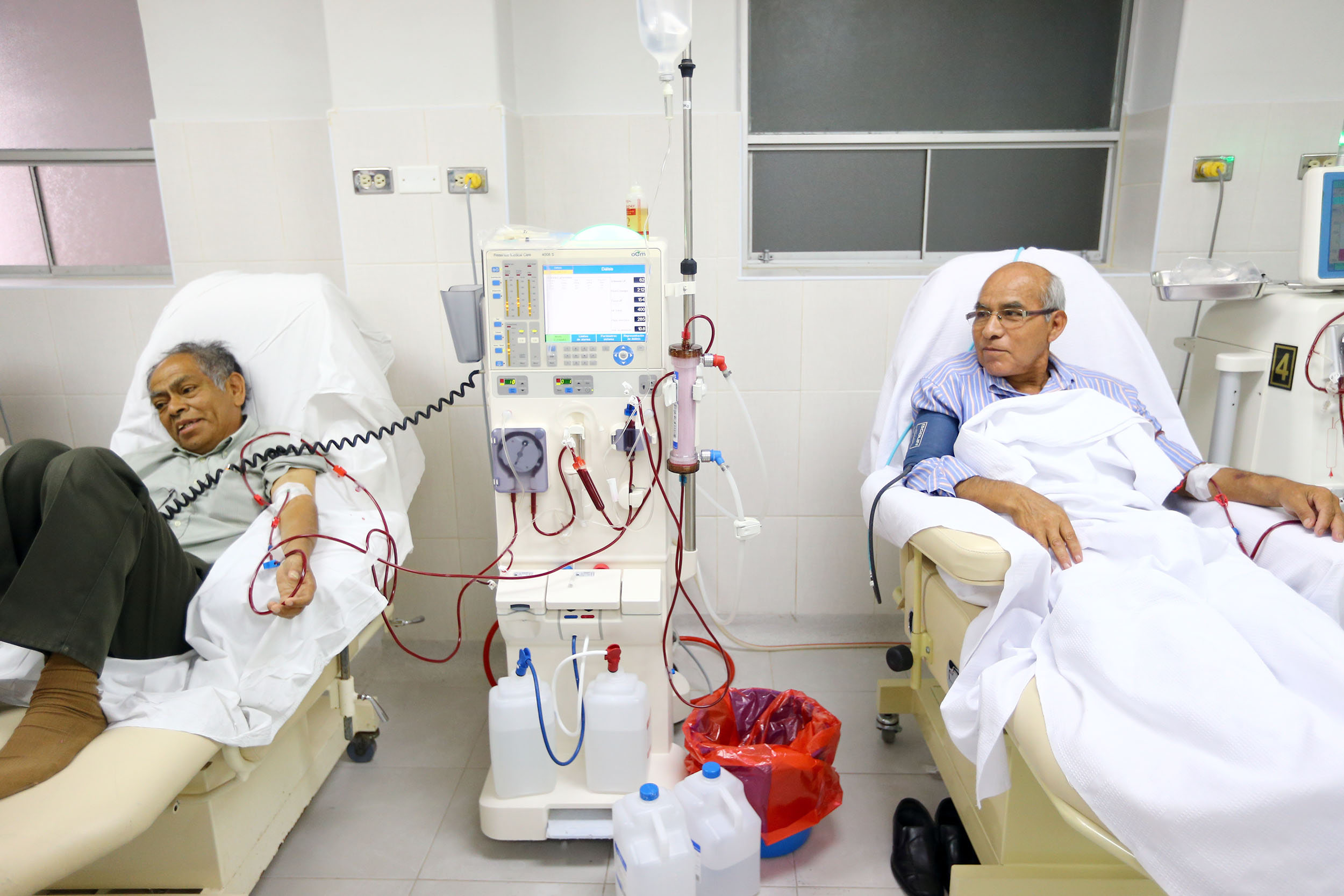
Two Patients at the Peruvian Naval Hospital

Peru has a decentralized healthcare system that consists of a combination of governmental and non-governmental coverage. Five sectors administer healthcare in Peru today: the Ministry of Health (60% of population), EsSalud (30% of population), and the Armed Forces (FFAA), National Police (PNP), and the private sector (10% of population).

== History ==
In the mid-1980s, the World Bank and International Monetary Fund (IMF) emerged as influential actors in global health policy. These institutions implemented Structural Adjustment Policies (SAPs) in many Latin American countries. While intended to promote economic growth, these policies often resulted in significant reductions in public expenditure on public sectors such as health and education. In Peru, the SAPs and conditional loans contributed to the underfunding of public hospitals, reductions in preventive care programs, and a decline in rural health outreach. These impacts produced a fragmented healthcare system with limited inclusion of marginalized communities in healthcare policy decision-making.

=== Decentralization and the CLAS reform ===
In 1994, Peru introduced reforms to strengthen primary care through the establishment of Local Committees for Health Administration (CLAS). These committees were tasked with assessing local health needs and determining unmet health needs. While designed to foster community involvement, CLAS faced significant limitations. Although some national health indicators improved during the 1990s, inequities between populations were unaccounted for. From 1996-1998, a state-run family planning program mass sterilized over 200,000 women, most of whom were poor, Indigenous, and rural individuals. The program prioritized sterilization over contraceptive options and often involved surgery under poor conditions, resulting in cases of injury and death. The program was widely condemned as a significant breach of human rights.

The impact of the CLAS model was constrained by its contract with the state. Operating within parameters defined by national policies and priorities, CLAS had limited autonomy and was unable to inform policy development or influence health strategies. The Peruvian healthcare system comprises both public and private providers, limiting coordination between regulatory entities. This fragmentation is often identified as a contributing factor to disparities in healthcare service quality and access. Public healthcare facilities, in particular, are commonly perceived as offering lower-quality care and being inadequately equipped with drugs and supplies. While national authorities are responsible for establishing healthcare policies and frameworks, the responsibility for implementation is delegated to regional and local officials, leading to inconsistencies in delivery across the country. Persistent barriers to care include shortages of medical professionals, inadequate infrastructure, and limited availability of services in rural areas.

=== Expanding coverage ===
In 2009, the Peruvian Ministry of Health (MINSA) passed a Universal Health Insurance Law in an effort to achieve universal health coverage. The law introduces a mandatory health insurance system, automatically registering everyone, regardless of age, who lives in extreme poverty under Integral Health Insurance (Seguro Integral de Salud, SIS). As a result, coverage has increased to over 80% of the Peruvian population having some form of health insurance. As of 2023, 99% of Peruvians have health insurance coverage, but many experience obstacles to access due to waiting times and distance. Health workers and access to healthcare continue to be concentrated in cities and coastal regions, with many areas of the country having few to no medical resources. However, the country has seen success in distributing and keeping health workers in more rural and remote regions through a decentralized human resources for health (HRH) retention plan. This plan, also known as SERUMS, involves having every Peruvian medical graduate spend a year as a primary care physician in a region or pueblo lacking medical providers, after which they go on to specialize in their own profession.

== Healthcare policy struggles ==
In the years since the collapse of the Peruvian health sector due to hyperinflation and terrorism in the 1980s and 1990s, healthcare in Peru has made great strides. Victories include an increase in spending; more health services and primary care clinics; a sharp spike in the utilization of health services, especially in rural areas; an improvement in treatment outcomes, and a decrease in infant mortality and child malnutrition. Many of these improvements can be explained by developments in education, sanitation, urbanization, and vaccine expansion. However, Peru was harshly impacted by the COVID-19 pandemic and various healthcare issues still exist.

=== Reducing the gap between the health status of the poor and -poor ===
Despite measures that have been taken to reduce disparities between middle-income and poor citizens, vast differences still exist. The infant mortality rates in Peru remain high considering its level of income. These rates go up significantly when discussing the poor. In general, Peru's poorest citizens are subject to unhealthy environmental conditions, decreased access to health services, and typically have lower levels of education. Because of environmental issues such as poor sanitation and vector infestation, higher occurrences of communicable diseases are usually seen among such citizens. Additionally, there is a highly apparent contrast between maternal health in rural (poor) versus urban environments. In rural areas, it was found that less than half of women had skilled attendants with them during delivery, compared to nearly 90% of urban women. According to a 2007 report, 36.1% of women in the poorest sector gave birth within a healthcare facility, compared to 98.4% of those in the richest sector. Peru's relatively high maternal mortality can be attributed to disparities such as these. In addition to allocating less of its GDP to health care than its Latin American counterparts, Peru also demonstrates inequalities in the amount of resources that are set aside for poor and -poor citizens. The richest 20% of the population consume approximately 4.5 times the amount of health good and services per capita than the poorest 20%.

=== Existing gaps in Peru's healthcare infrastructure ===
Peru has one of the highest cancer mortality rates in South America, a situation partly attributed to inadequate access to screening, diagnostic care, and treatment. Although community initiatives have sought to address these gaps, research indicates that patients' perceptions of care remain a critical determinant of healthcare quality. Under current health administration and infrastructure, providers face difficulties in delivering personalized and empathetic treatment due to systemic constraints such as understaffing, time pressures, and resource shortages. Even when health needs are recognized through public discourse, they are often translated policies and laws that favour dominant groups or oversimplify the problem. Reducing these gaps requires more than service expansion, it demands structural transformation and increasing capacity of communities to engage with the health sector.

== Traditional and indigenous medicine ==
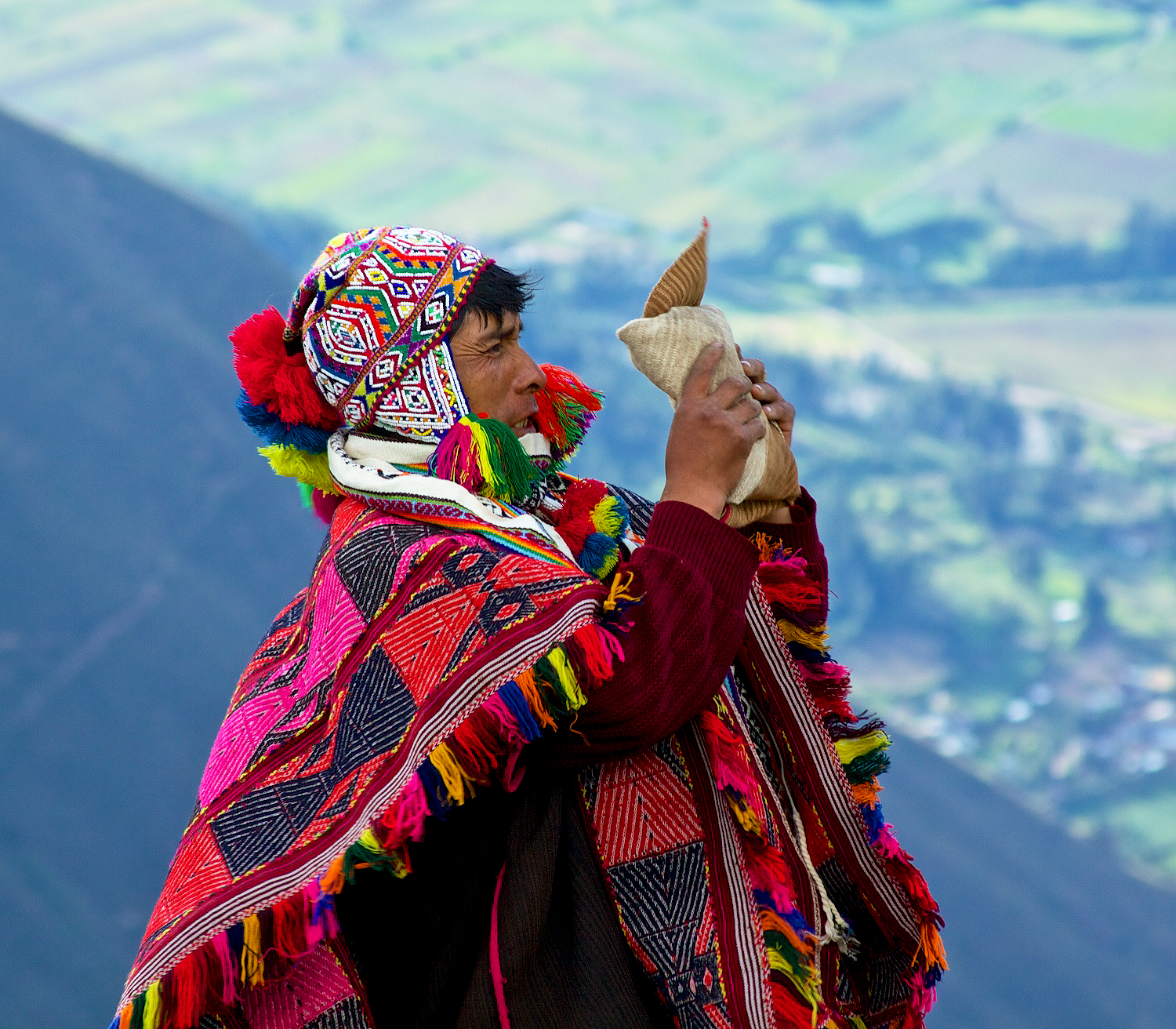
A Curanderos performing a ceremony

As of 2006, approximately 47% of the Peruvian population is considered indigenous. Many indigenous people continue to carry out medical practices utilized by their ancestors, which makes the Peruvian medical system very interesting and unique. In many parts of the country, shamans (also known as curanderos) help to maintain the balance between body and soul. It is a commonly held belief that when this relationship is disturbed, illness will result. Common illnesses experienced by the indigenous population of Peru include susto (fright sickness), hap'iqasqa (being grabbed by the earth), machu wayra (an evil wind or ancestor sickness), uraña (illness caused by the wind or walking soul), colds, bronchitis, and tuberculosis. To treat many of these maladies, indigenous communities rely on a mix of traditional and modern medicine.

=== Intersection of traditional and modern medicine ===
Shamanism is still an important part of medical care in Peru, with curanderos, traditional healers, serving local communities, often free of charge. One important aspect of Peruvian Amazon's curanderos is their use of ayahuasca, a brew with a long ceremonial history, traditionally used by the shaman to help in his/her healing work. With the introduction of Western medicine to many areas in Peru, however, interest in undergoing the training to become a curandero is diminishing, and shamans are innovating new avenues to use ayahuasca. Young individuals have increasingly been using the popular interest of tourists in the brew and its psychotherapeutic properties as a reason to undergo the training to become a curandero and continue the traditions.

Curanderos, medicinal plants, and traditional medicine still have a place in the Peruvian healthcare system, even as biomedicine (Western Medicine) is made available and affordable for all, including rural communities. In fact, it's been seen that the continued use of traditional medical treatments is independent of access or affordability of biomedical care, in Peru and in many other indigenous regions in Latin America. There is a strong reliance on medicinal plant use within households, especially as a first response to a health emergency. Many households maintain a strong base of knowledge of medicinal plants, valuing independence in being able to address health emergencies, though the emphasis on maintaining this store of knowledge is decreasing. Studies show that Peruvian households, like ones in the Andean region near Pitumarca, and ones in the shantytown of El Porvenir near Trujillo, still prefer herbal treatments to the use of pharmaceuticals, particularly for specific cultural, or psychosocial illnesses. Though some preferred pharmaceuticals to household herbal solutions, because they are more effective, prescribed by doctors, and backed scientific research, others had many reasons for preferring traditional solutions. Reasons included a view that medicinal plants are more natural and healthy, are less expensive, and are able to treat cultural and regional illnesses outside the scope of biomedicine. One study also pointed to continued reliance on medicinal plants as a form of "cultural resistance"; despite biomedicine's domination over indigenous health systems, local communities use both in conjunction and perceive local remedies as both effective and a representation of cultural identity. With the emergence of biomedicine in these communities, they saw a valorization of traditional and local remedies as a response. In other instances, for example with childbirth, the government has played a larger role in pushing biomedical and technological services. This is in part due to development efforts and population politics, but these measures have been resisted, accepted, and modified by indigenous women.

However, many Peruvians exercise "medical pluralism" in their health-seeking behavior, employing a combination of different health systems. For example, some women encouraged and coerced into going to the medical clinic for childbirth took the pharmaceutical pills prescribed with medicinal herbal tea. Western medicine and traditional medicine are not viewed as mutually exclusive, and instead are used complementarily, with households' often passing judgement on treatment they think will be most effective with each medical emergency.

=== Quality of health in indigenous communities ===
Indigenous populations in Peru generally face worse health risks than other populations in the country. One source of this issue is access to health facilities. Health facilities are often a large distance away from indigenous communities and are difficult to access. Many indigenous communities within Peru are located in areas that have little land transportation. This hinders the indigenous population's ability to access care facilities. Distance along with financial constraints act as deterrents from seeking medical help. Furthermore, the Peruvian government has yet to devote significant amounts of resources to improving the quality and access to care in rural areas.

There is some debate as to whether traditional medicine is a factor in the quality of health in indigenous populations. The indigenous groups of the Peruvian Amazon practice traditional medicine and healing at an especially high rate; Traditional medicine is more affordable and accessible than other alternatives and has cultural significance. It has been argued that the use of traditional medicine may keep indigenous populations from seeking help for diseases such as tuberculosis, however this has been disproven. While some indigenous individuals choose to practice traditional medicine before seeking help from a medical professional, this number is negligible and the use of traditional medicine does not seem to prevent indigenous groups seeking medical attention.

== Government role and spending ==
Peru's health system is divided into several key sectors: The Ministry of Health of Peru (Ministerio de Salud, or MINSA), EsSalud (Seguro Social de Salud), smaller public programs, a large public sector, and several NGOs.

=== Infrastructure ===
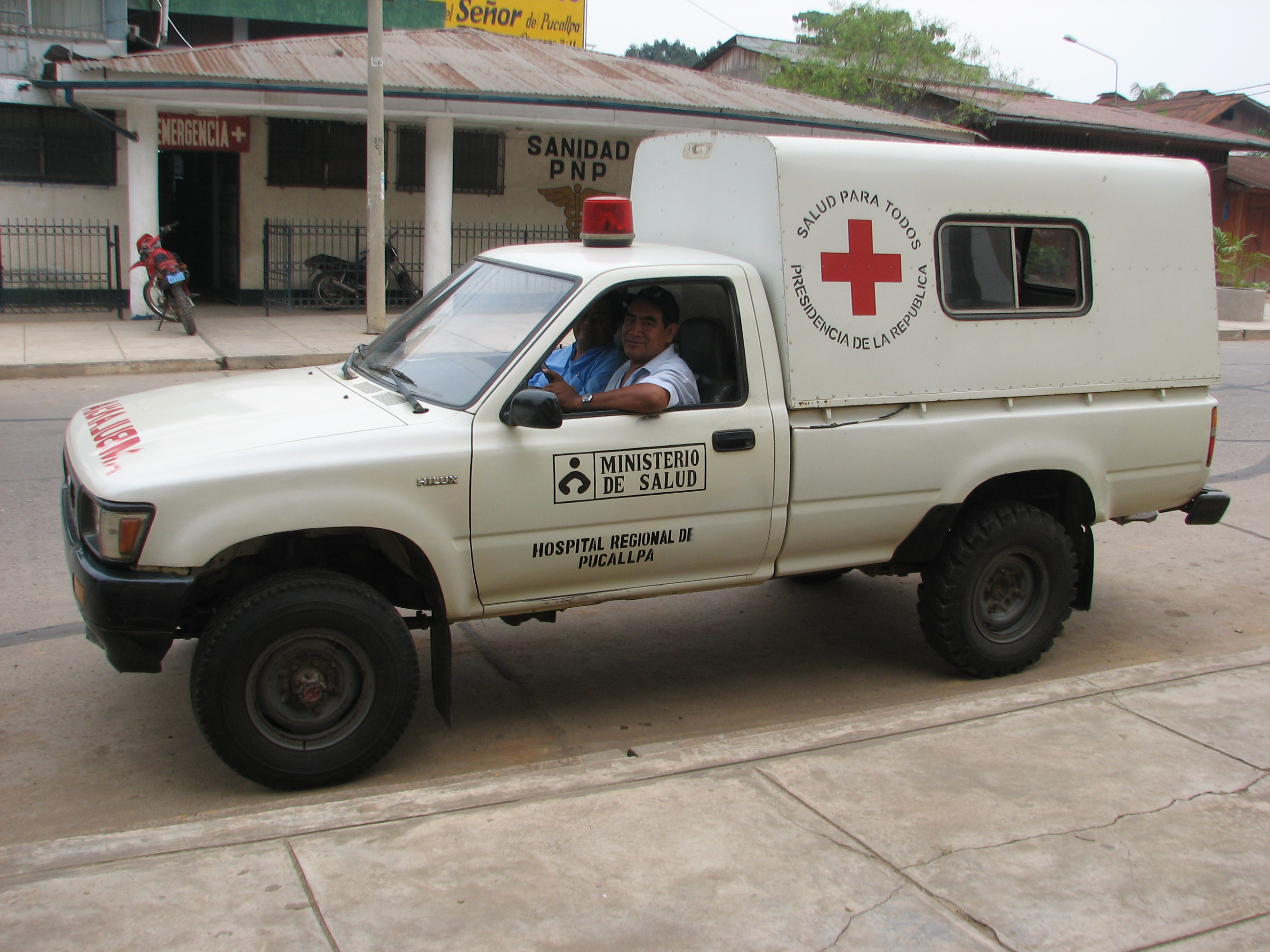
Ambulance in Pucallpa

In 2014, the National Registry of Health Establishments and Medical Services (Registro Nacional de Establecimientos de Salud y Servicios Medicos de Apoyo - RENAES) indicated there were 1,078 hospitals in the country. Hospitals pertain to one of 13 dependencies, the most important of which are Regional Governments (450 hospitals, 42% of the total), EsSalud (97 hospitals, 9% of the total), MINSA (54 hospitals, 5% of the total) and the Private Sector (413 hospitals, 38% of the total).
Lima, the capital city, accounts for 23% of the country's hospitals (250 hospitals).

=== MINSA ===
According to its website, the mission of the Ministry of Health of Peru (MINSA) is to "protect the personal dignity, promote health, prevent disease and ensure comprehensive health care for all inhabitants of the country, and propose and lead health care policy guidelines in consultation with all public and social actors." To carry out its goals, MINSA is funded by tax revenues, external loans, and user fees. MINSA provides the bulk of Peru's primary health care services, especially for the poor. In 2004, MINSA recorded 57 million visits, or about 80% of public sector health care. MINSA offers a type of health insurance called Seguro Integral de Salud which is free to Peruvian citizens.

=== EsSALUD ===
EsSalud is Peru's equivalent of a social security program, and it is funded by payroll taxes paid by the employers of sector workers. It arose after there was pressure during the 1920s for some kind of system that would protect the increasing number of union workers. In 1935, the Peruvian government took measures to study the social security systems of Argentina, Chile, and Uruguay. Following the study, EsSalud was formed in Peru. Because private insurance covers just a tiny percentage of the citizens, programs such as MINSA and EsSALUD are crucial for Peruvians. EsSalud, however, is not completely free to Peruvian citizens, unlike Seguro Integral de Salud, which offers free basic healthcare. The cost of EsSalud is much cheaper than private healthcare options.

=== Role of non-governmental organizations ===
The Peruvian constitution recognizes the right to health, however some scholars argue that it is often regarded as aspirational rather than obligatory. Although national policies address the right to health, implementation at regional and local levels have been inconsistent. In this context, non-governmental organizations (NGOs) have emerged as important actors in healthcare advocacy and service delivery. NGOs have influenced change in Peru's national health system and contributed to the expansion of other developmental initiatives.

NGOs began appearing in Peru in the 1960s, and have steadily increased since then. Founded in 1987, Partners in Health was one of the leaders in delivering high-quality healthcare to disadvantaged communities. Projects began in Haiti and expanded to other countries, including Peru. Maximo Nivel, founded in 2003, continues this work through culturally attuned, community-based health initiatives in Peru. The end of the violence associated with the Shining Path movement accelerated the growth of NGOs in Peru. Other prevalent NGOs in Peru include USAID, Doctors without Borders, UNICEF, CARE, and AIDESEP. Such programs work with MINSA to improve infrastructure and make changes to health practices and insurance programs. Many organizations also work on the frontlines of healthcare, providing medication (including contraceptives and vitamins), education, and support to Peruvians, especially in poor or less accessible areas where the need is greatest. Such programs have helped the Peruvian government combat diseases such as AIDS and tuberculosis, and have generally reduced mortality and improved standards of living.

=== Spending ===
Relative to the rest of Latin America, Peru does not spend very much on health care for its citizens. 2004 reports showed that spending in Peru was 3.5 percent of its GDP, compared to 7 percent for the rest of Latin America. Additionally, Peru spent US$100 per capita on health in 2004, compared to an average of US$262 per capita that was spent by the rest of the countries in Latin America. However, Peru does spend more on healthcare than it does on its military, which differentiates it from many other Latin American countries.

== See also ==
- Health in Peru

== Bibliography ==
- Borja, A. (2010). Medical pluralism in Peru—Traditional medicine in Peruvian society . (Master in Arts in Global Studies, Brandeis University).
- Cotlear, D. (Ed.). (2006). A new social contract for Peru: An agenda for improving education, health care, and the social safety net. Washington, D.C.: The World Bank.
- EsSalud: Seguridad Social para todos. (2012). Plan estrategico institucional 2012–2016. Lima, Peru.
- Ministerio de salud del Peru. (2012). Retrieved Dec/10, 2012, (Minsa.gob.pe)
- Peru: Improving health care for the poor (1999). . Washington, D.C.: World Bank.
- Raul A Montenegro, Carolyn Stephens. (2006). Indigenous health in Latin America and the Caribbean. Lancet, 367, October 28, 2012 – 1859–69.
- Young, F., & Merschrod, K. (2009). Child health and NGOs in Peruvian provinces., Dec 12, 2012.
