= Saint Philip =

Saint Philip, São Filipe, or San Felipe may refer to:

== Saints ==
- Philip the Apostle (died 54 or 80), one of the Twelve Apostles of Jesus Christ
- Philip the Evangelist (died first century), also known as Philip the Deacon, one of the Seventy Disciples
- Philip of Agira (died 103 or fifth century), early Christian priest and missionary
- Philip of Gortyna (died 180), Bishop of Gortyna and early Christian apologist
- Philip of Fermo (died c. 270), Bishop of Fermo and hieromartyr
- Philip of Heraclea (died c. 304), Bishop of Heraclea and Eastern Orthodox saint
- Philip of Vienne (c. 578), Bishop of Vienne
- Philip of Zell (c. 770), German hermit who founded a monastery in Zell (Zellertal)

=== Eastern Orthodox ===
- Philip II of Moscow (1507–1569), Metropolitan of All Rus' and hieromartyr

=== Roman Catholic ===
- Philip Benizi de Damiani (1233–1285), also known as Philip Benitius or Filippo Benizzi
- Philip Neri (1515–1595)
- Philip Minh Van Phan, one of the Vietnamese Martyrs

== Places ==
=== In the Americas ===
- Saint Philip Parish, Antigua and Barbuda
- Saint Philip, Barbados
- San Felipe, Baja California, Mexico
- San Felipe Creek (Salton Sea)
- San Felipe Creek (Santa Clara County)
- San Felipe Creek (Texas)
- San Felipe, Orange Walk, Belize
- San Felipe, Guainía, Colombia
- San Felipe, Guanajuato, Mexico
- Saint Philip, Indiana, United States
- San Felipe Pueblo, New Mexico, United States
- San Felipe, Texas, United States
  - Del Rio, Texas, United States, formerly named San Felipe Del Rio
- San Felipe, Yucatán, Mexico
- San Felipe, Lima, a neighborhood in Jesus Maria District, Peru
- San Felipe, Yaracuy, in Venezuela
- San Felipe de Puerto Plata, in the Dominican Republic
- San Felipe, Chile
- San Felipe, Retalhuleu, in Guatemala
- San Felipe, Panama, a division of Panama City
- Castillo de San Felipe (disambiguation)

=== Elsewhere ===
- São Filipe, Cape Verde
- São Filipe, Cape Verde (municipality)
- Sint Philipsland (island), a former island in the Dutch province of Zeeland
- Sint Philipsland (village), a village in the Dutch municipality of Tholen
- San Felipe, Zambales, in the Philippines
- San Felipe, fictional island in the novel Success To The Brave by Douglas Reeman (writing as Alexander Kent)

== Ships ==
- San Felipe (1690)
- San Felipe (shipwreck), wrecked in Florida
- San Felipe incident (1596), wrecked in Japan
- San Felipe incident (1835), involved in a naval battle between Mexico and Texas

== Other uses ==
- Saint Philip (Nanni di Banco), a c. 1410 – c. 1412 sculpture of Philip the Apostle
- Convento de San Felipe el Real, a former convent in Madrid
- San Felipe Cooperative School in Lima, Peru

== See also ==
- San Felipe Municipality (disambiguation)
- Philip (disambiguation)
