= Natural History Museum =

Natural History Museum or Museum of Natural History may refer to:

- Natural history museum, a scientific institution with natural history collections
  - List of natural history museums
- American Museum of Natural History, New York City, United States
- Croatian Natural History Museum, Zagreb, Croatia
- Museum of Natural History, Belgrade, Serbia
- Museum of Natural History, Görlitz, Germany
- Museum of Natural History, Lima, Peru
- Museum of Natural History, University of Wrocław, Poland
- Museum of Natural History and Archaeology, Trondheim, Norway
- National Natural History Museum of China, Beijing
- National Museum of Natural History, France, Paris
- National Museum of Natural History, Washington D.C., United States
- Natural History Museum, Berlin, Germany
- Natural History Museum, London, England
- Natural History Museum, Port Louis, Mauritius
- Natural History Museum, Vienna, Austria
- Natural History Museum of the University of Zurich, Switzerland
- Oxford University Museum of Natural History, England
- University of Michigan Museum of Natural History, Ann Arbor, Michigan, United States
