= Diocese of San Felipe =

(Roman Catholic) Diocese of San Felipe may refer to the following Catholic jurisdictions with episcopal sees called San Felipe (named after Saint Philip, in Spanish), notably in South America :

- Roman Catholic Diocese of San Felipe, Chile
- Roman Catholic Diocese of San Felipe, Venezuela
