= Lucho Quequezana =

Peruvian musician (born 1974)

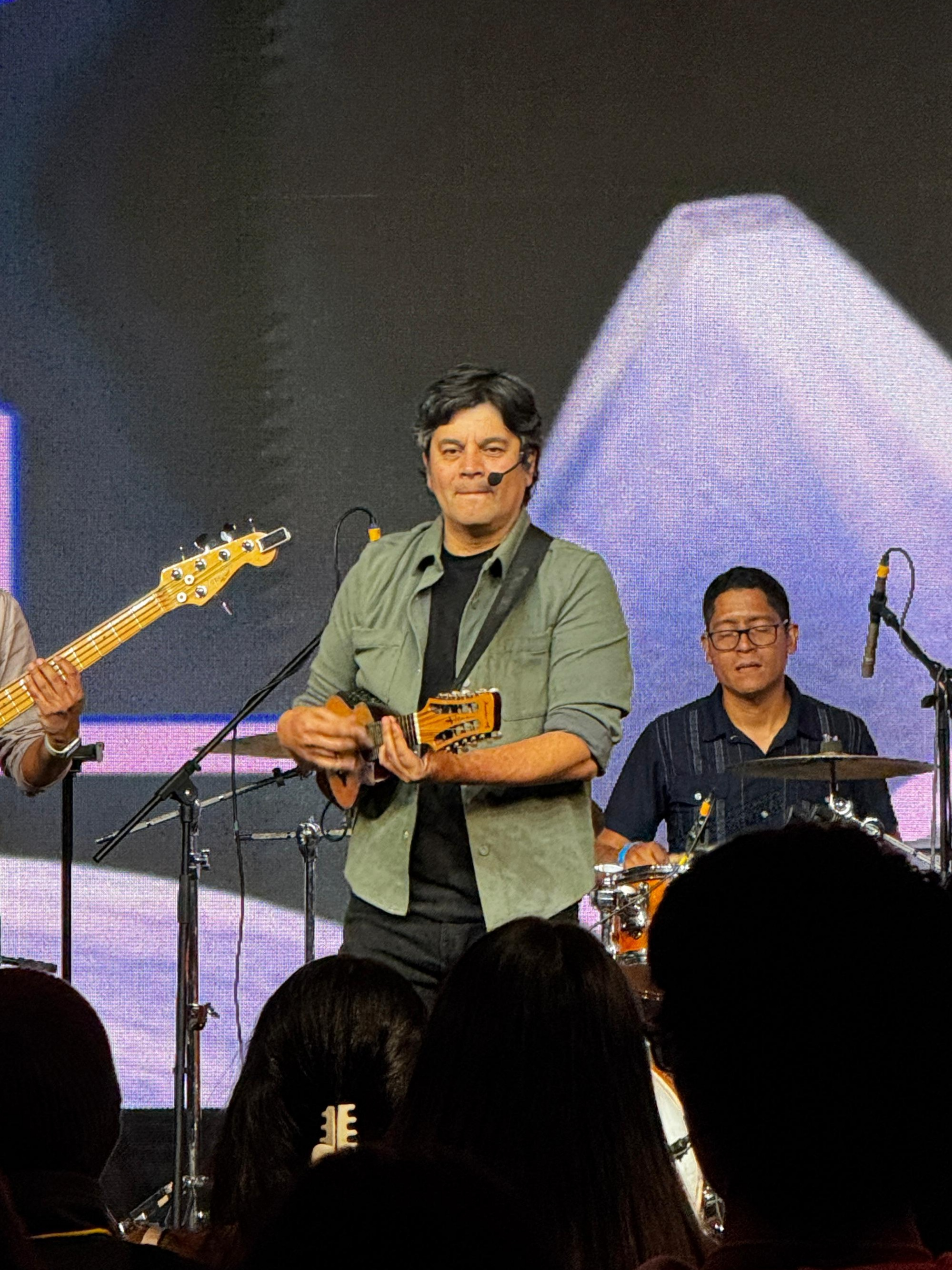
- Quequezana performing at Comet Fest in June 2025

Background information
- Born: Luis Rafael Quequezana Jaimes; September 25, 1974 (age 52); Lima, Peru
- Genres: Andean music, traditional Peruvian music
- Occupations: Musician; multi-instrumentalist; composer; record producer; television presenter
- Instruments: Percussion, string instruments, wind instruments
- Years active: 1998–present
- Labels: Play Music; Cabina Libre
- Website: www.luchoquequezana.com

Luis Rafael Quequezana Jaimes (born 25 September 1974), known professionally as Lucho Quequezana, is a Peruvian musician, multi-instrumentalist, composer, record producer and television presenter. He is known for his work in traditional Peruvian music and for his involvement in composing the soundtrack for 2019 Pan American Games in Lima.

== Early life and education ==
Quequezana was born in Lima to a teacher mother from Huánuco and an engineer father from Cusco. At age 11, he moved with his family to Huancayo because of his older brother's illness, and it was there that he first came into contact with music. He taught himself to play music from the age of 11 and wrote his first composition at 13. He later studied communications at the University of Lima. He later settled in Barranco District, Lima.

== Career ==
From the start of his career, Quequezana has focused on traditional Andean music, performing on more than 25 string, percussion and wind instruments. His fusion-oriented approach to Peruvian music and his multi-instrumental performances led him to present his work internationally, especially in Europe, the United States, Canada and Asia; he has also performed for Emperor Akihito and the Japanese imperial family.

His project Sonidos Vivos, which sought to teach Peruvian music to musicians from different parts of the world, won a UNESCO competition. In 2005, he received a UNESCO scholarship for the project in Canada.

In 2002, Quequezana opened Cabina Libre, a studio in Lima where he began composing music for films, stage works, radio and television.

In Peru, his album Kuntur was the country's best-selling album of 2011 and the fourth best-selling album of 2012. He was named an ambassador of the Peru Brand campaign in 2011.

In 2012, he began hosting the television program Prueba de sonido on Plus TV. The same year, he presented a live show with Huu Bac Quach, with whom he had worked on Sonidos Vivos.

In March 2013, Quequezana staged what was reported as Peru's first solar-powered concert, at Plaza Mayor, Lima. This was complemented by another concert at the Teatro Peruano Japonés.

Quequezana participated in the composition of the soundtrack for the Lima 2019 Pan American Games. In 2024, he revived that material on stage in a new live production.

In 2025, Corporación E. Wong launched DanSa, a restaurant and performance venue combining Peruvian cuisine with popular dances from Peru, with Quequezana in charge of the musical component alongside choreographer Vania Masías.

== Discography ==
- Kuntur (2004)
- Combi (2014)
- Pangea (2018)
- Andino (2025)

== Awards and recognition ==
According to his official website and other published sources, Quequezana's recognitions include the following:

- First prize in CONACINE's 2001 short film competition, in the categories of Best Director and Best Short Film (Lima, Peru)
- Finalist at the WCO Korea Olympics of the Cultures in 2004 (Seoul, South Korea)
- Jury member at the Latin American film festival El Cine in 2004, 2005 and 2007 (Lima, Peru)
- Winner of the UNESCO–Aschberg–MMM residency in 2006 (Canada)
- Recognized in 2006 for the best performance in the history of the UNESCO Aschberg–MMM residency, for his Sonidos Vivos project (Canada)
- Member of the international jury for the Galaxy Canada Prize in 2007 (Canada)
- Nominated for Concert of the Year at the Prix Opus in 2007 (Canada)
- Member of the UNESCO Aschberg selection jury in 2007 (Canada)
- CONACINE Award in the Best Music category in 2007 (Lima, Peru)
- Prize in CONACINE's 2008 documentary project competition for the documentary project on Sonidos Vivos (Lima, Peru)
- IBERMEDIA Award in 2009 for the documentary project on Sonidos Vivos (Spain)
- Awarded by Indecopi for the successful use of intellectual property tools in 2013
- In 2014, Combi received a nomination at the Latin Grammy Awards in the Best Recording Package category.
- Winner of the National Culture Award in 2014, in the Creativity category
