= National Culture Award =

National Culture Award may refer to:

- National Culture Award (Bolivia)
- National Culture Award (Peru)
- National Cultural Award, Taiwan
