= Japanese Peruvian Association =

Japanese cultural association in Peru

- Formation: November 3, 1917; 108 years ago
- Website: www.apj.org.pe

The Japanese Peruvian Association (Spanish: Asociación Peruano Japonesa, APJ) is a cultural association and institution that brings together and represents Japanese citizens and those of Japanese descent residing in Peru. It was founded on November 3, 1917, under the name of Central Japanese Society (Spanish: Sociedad Central Japonesa) and has its institutional headquarters (as well as a museum about Japanese Immigration) in the building of the Peruvian Japanese Cultural Center, located in the district of Jesús María, in Lima, Peru.

== See also ==
- Japan–Peru relations
- Teatro Peruano Japonés
