= San Felipe Cooperative School =

- Spanish: Centro Educativo de Gestion Cooperativa San Felipe

Location
- Avenida Gregorio Escobedo 985; Jesus Maria, Lima; Peru

Information
- Other name: Colegio San Felipe
- Type: Private primary and secondary school
- Religious affiliation: Catholicism (1967-1968)
- Established: 1967; 59 years ago
- Founder: Society of Jesus
- Principal: Miguel Ángel Kanashiro Toyama
- Grades: K-12
- Color: Blue
- Yearbook: Anuario
- Website: www.colegiosanfelipe.edu.pe

San Felipe Cooperative School (Spanish: Centro Educativo de Gestion Cooperativa San Felipe) is a private primary and secondary school, located in Lima, Peru. The school is situated at 985 Avenida Gregorio Escobedo in the city district of Jesús María, and within the limits of San Felipe residential complex.

== History ==
The school was established in 1967 as Jesuit Catholic school under the religious congregation of the Missionary Oblates of Mary Immaculate. In 1969, during the military government of Gen. Juan Velasco Alvarado, the religious order withdrew from the school. The parents' association then established a cooperative to run the school. This cooperative received official recognition via Government Resolution N° 007-74-DAE ORAMI IV of February 28, 1974. On July 21, 1989 under government resolution N° 1568-USE13 the school was recognized as “Centro Educativo de Gestion Cooperativa San Felipe".

In the 1980s and 1990s, San Felipe School was well known throughout Lima, attracting students from well beyond the San Felipe area. It's being run by a parents' cooperative made it an attractive option for some on philosophical grounds.

Based on the academic performance of its graduates, San Felipe is ranked among the best schools in Peru by the respected Pontificia Universidad Católica del Perú (PUCP). As a result, San Felipe has consistently earned a spot on the list of schools whose top students seeking admission to the PUCP are exempted from the university's entrance examination.

== School facilities ==
The school has a 58,000-square-foot (5,400 m^{2}) facility, which in addition to classrooms, includes a paved yard with two mini-soccer pitches, one basketball court, and one volleyball court.

== Notable alumni ==
- Germán Kino Ganoza ("Cherman"), graphic artist
- Lucho Quequezana, composer, musician

== See also ==
- Education in Peru
