= Peru Brand =

Peruvian tourism initiative

Peru Brand or Brand Peru is an initiative of the Ministry of Foreign Trade and Tourism of Peru in partnership with Peruvian companies and startups to promote the purchase and consumption of products created in Peru. It also seeks to boost tourism, exports and attract investment using branding and neuromarketing.

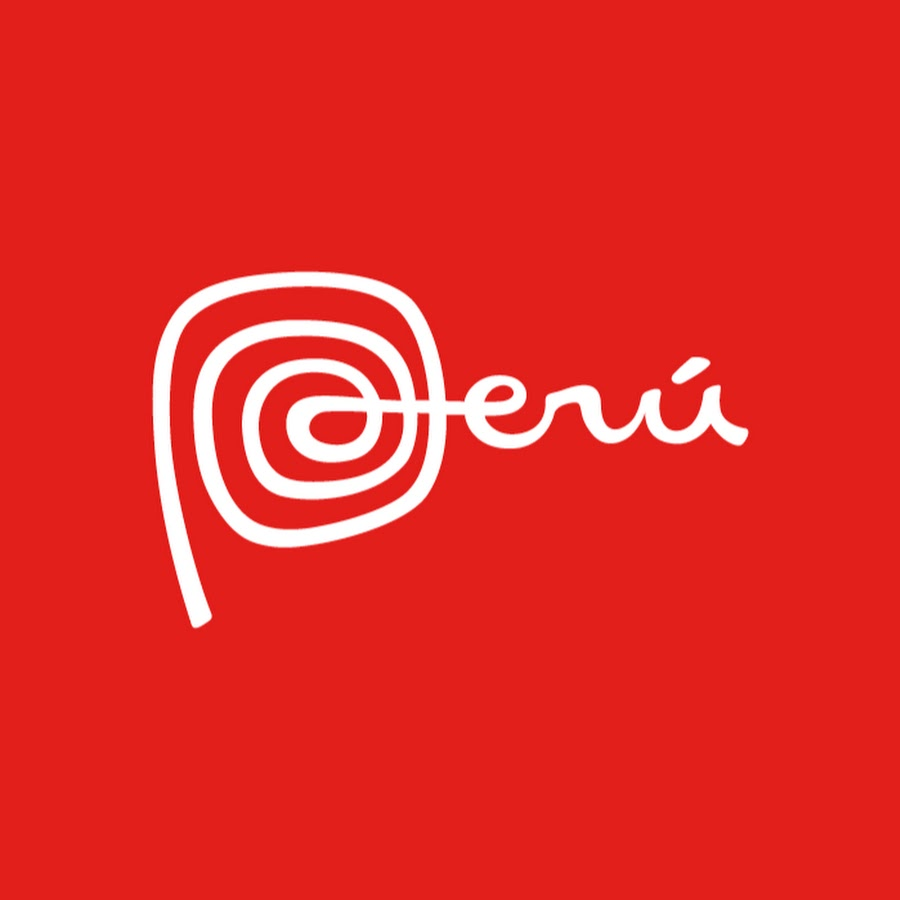
Peru Brand

Brand Peru leads among the corporate identities of Latin America, thanks to the efforts of Peruvian companies to maintain the multicultural identity of the country. Therefore, even Peruvian startups and foreign companies can request a license to use the Peru Brand in advertisements or products. According to the tourism edition of the 'Country Brand Ranking' report carried out by Bloom Consulting, Peru Brand climbed 11 positions in the ranking compared to the 2014 - 2015 report; placing Peru in the position 41 of the global list of the report corresponding to the period 2017 - 2018.

== History ==
Since 2002, PromPeru (Commission for the Promotion of Peru for Exports and Tourism) has used different means and tools to boost tourism and investment in Peru. In 2011, together with the Ministry of Foreign Trade and Tourism, they created Peru Brand in association with various Peruvian companies and startups that collaborate with each other in order to improve Peru's image in the world.

On 10 March 2011, the launch of the new Peru Brand was announced, and it was presented to the world during the ITB fair in Berlin, and the New York Stock Exchange.

Since then more than 200 companies have requested PromPerú the license for the use of Peru Brand, which is free from its website. Among the areas where this brand is most used is tourism, agriculture, textiles and hotels.

Under the philosophy of making Peru known to the world, Peru Brand performs and participates in different events every year. Up to now, the campaigns of Peru Brand have had a reach of 2.491 million people worldwide, results that are they are reflected in the best positions the country has reached in different rankings. According to the Country RepTrak (a study that measures the reputation of countries), Peru is the third Latin American country with the best reputation in the industrialized countries environment, residing its strengths in the kindness of its people and its natural environment.

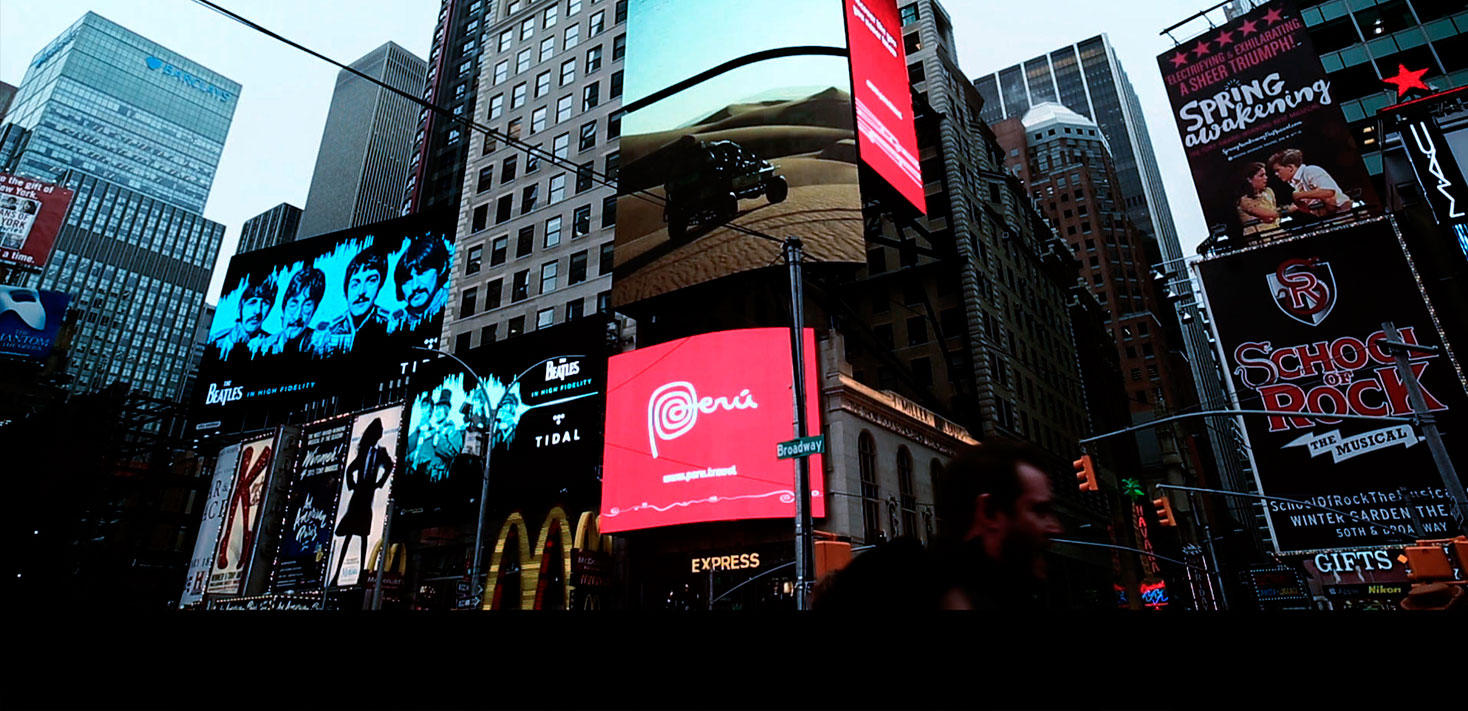
Peru Brand in Times Square

== Companies ==
Companies that use Peru Brand:

- Inca Kola
- D'Onofrio
- Primax
- Topitop
- Agroindustrias del Sur
- Pioneer Corporation
- ADUNI
- Cementos Lima
- LAN Airlines
- Hoteles Casa Andina
- Industria Textil Nuevo Mundo
- Latina Televisión
- Agronegocios Wanka
- Agroindustrias Integradas
- Agroindustrias Santa María
- BBVA
- Sazón Lopesa
- Grupo Gloria
- Café Britt
- Bembos
- Saco Oliveros School
- Filtros Lys
- Parque Arauco
- Turismo CIVA
- Baterías Etna
- Saga Falabella
- Frenosa
- Y&R
- Molitalia
- Ripley
- Ajeper
- Altomayo
- Peruvian Airlines
- National University of San Marcos
- Induquímica
- Austral
- Productos Unión
- Hotel Westin
- Innovadent
- Editora El Óvalo
- Camposol
- Corporación Panaservice
- Cerveza Cristal
- Danper Trujillo
- Consorcio Turístico Norte
- Nabisco
- Crecemás Peru Digital
- Huankarute
- Alicorp
- Fuller Academy
