= Museum of Natural History, Lima =

Museum in Lima, Peru

Museum of Natural History
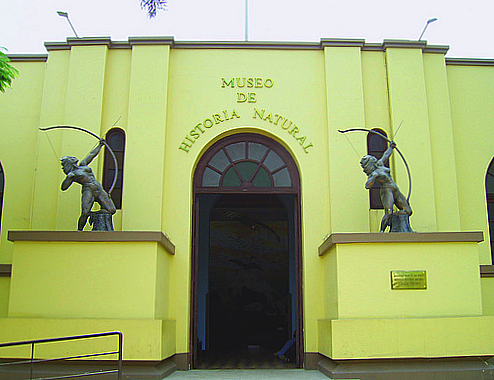
- Natural History Museum of the National University of San Marcos
- Established: 28 February 1918; 108 years ago
- Location: Av. Arenales 1256, Jesús María, Lima, Peru
- Coordinates: 12°04′39″S 77°02′14″W
- Type: Natural History
- Director: Victor Pacheco Torres
- Website: museohn.unmsm.edu.pe

The Natural History Museum (Spanish: Museo de Historia Natural) in Lima, is Peru's most important museum of natural history. It was established in 1918 and belongs to the National University of San Marcos.

== History ==
The museum was founded in 1918 by the Faculty of Sciences of the Universidad Nacional Mayor de San Marcos. The first director and founder of the museum was Carlos Rospigliosi.

The initial personal of the museum consisted in one curator in chief, and three curators for the areas of Zoology, Botany and Mineralogy.

The first scientific expedition was organized by Rospigliosi in April 1918, that collected specimens of fauna, flora and minerals from the departments of Junín and Huánuco. The second expedition was organized by the Geographic Society of Lima in 1920 that included the participation of Swedish geologist and explorer Otto Nordenskiöld. This expedition explored the highlands and foothills of the Andes in the department of Junín.

In 1920, the rector of the National University of San Marcos, Dr. Javier Prado, interceded in order to acquire the collections of Antonio Raimondi for the recently created museum. These samples included zoological, botanical and mineralogical specimens.

== The building ==
Originally, the museum was located at the Faculty of Humanities and Social Sciences at the campus in Parque Universitario. In 1934, it moved to its current location on 1256 Arenales Avenue, Jesús María in Lima, Peru.

== Collections ==
The museum is repository of representative specimens of Peruvian fauna, flora and minerals, including exhibitions of mammals, primates, invertebrates, reptiles, amphibians, birds, plants, fossils, dinosaurs, fish and minerals.

Highlights of the collections include:

- Skeletons of a sperm whale
- Fossils of South American horses
- Fossils of giant ground sloths

== Publications ==
The first publication series was the Boletín del Museo de Historia Natural in 1937 aimed to divulge institutional activities and results of scientific research. The Publicaciones del Museo series in Zoology, Botany and Geology were published from 1948, the Memorias del Museo in 1951 and the Serie de Divulgación in 1964.
