= Castillo de San Felipe =

Castillo de San Felipe may refer to:

- Castillo San Felipe de Barajas in Colombia
- Castillo de San Felipe de Lara in Guatemala
- Castillo San Felipe del Morro in Puerto Rico
- Castillo de San Felipe in Ferrol, Spain
- Castillo de San Felipe in Venezuela
