= Senckenberg Museum for Natural History Görlitz =

Natural history museum in Görlitz, Germany

- Senckenberg Museum für Naturkunde Görlitz
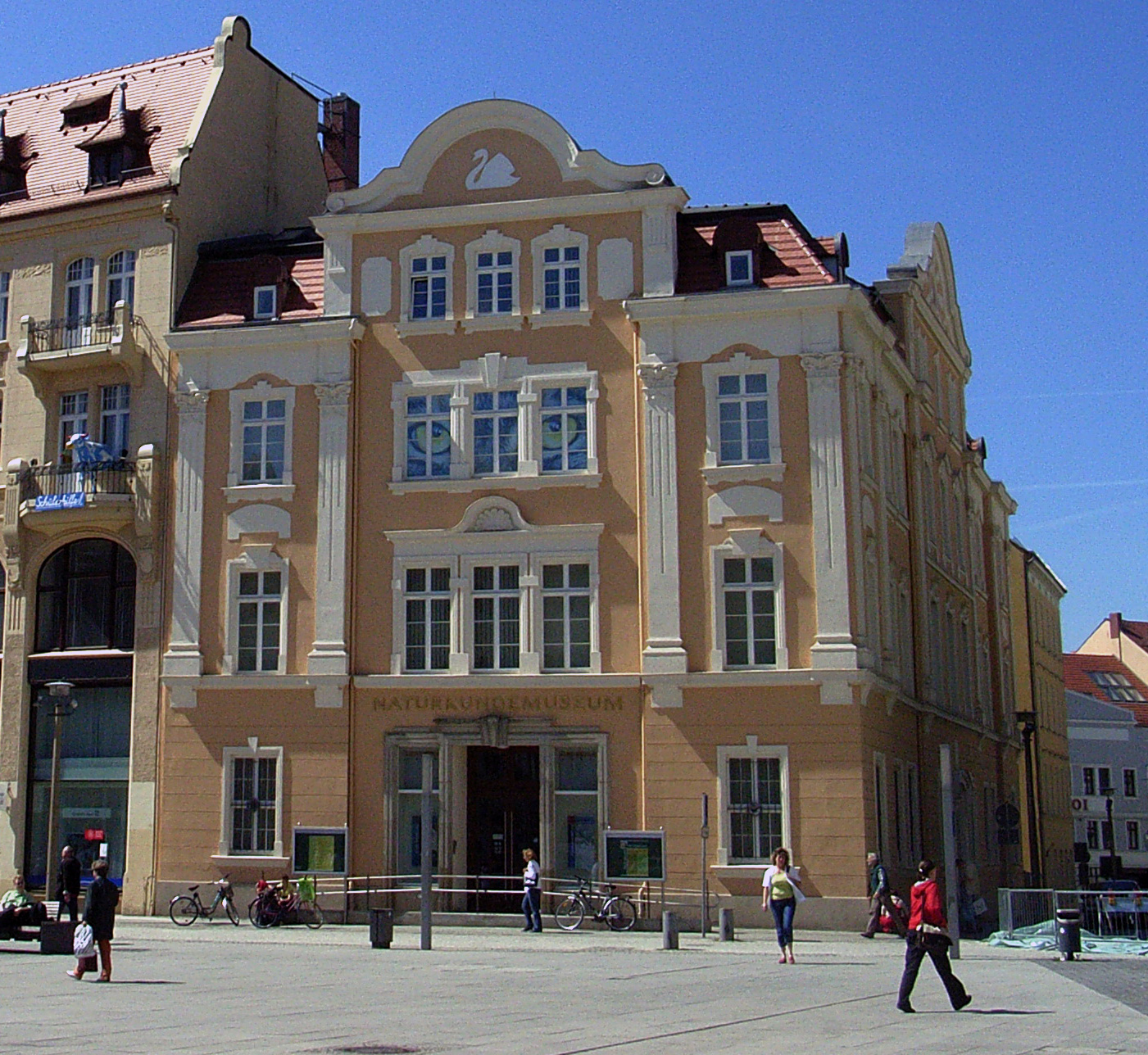

- Location in Germany Senckenberg Museum for Natural History Görlitz (Germany)
- Former name: Staatliches Museum für Naturkunde
- Established: 1811
- Location: Görlitz
- Coordinates: 51°09′10″N 14°59′14″E
- Type: Natural history museum
- Founders: Johann Gottlieb Kretzschmar and Aktuars Giese
- Director: Prof. Dr. Willi Xylander
- Website: museumgoerlitz.senckenberg.de/en/

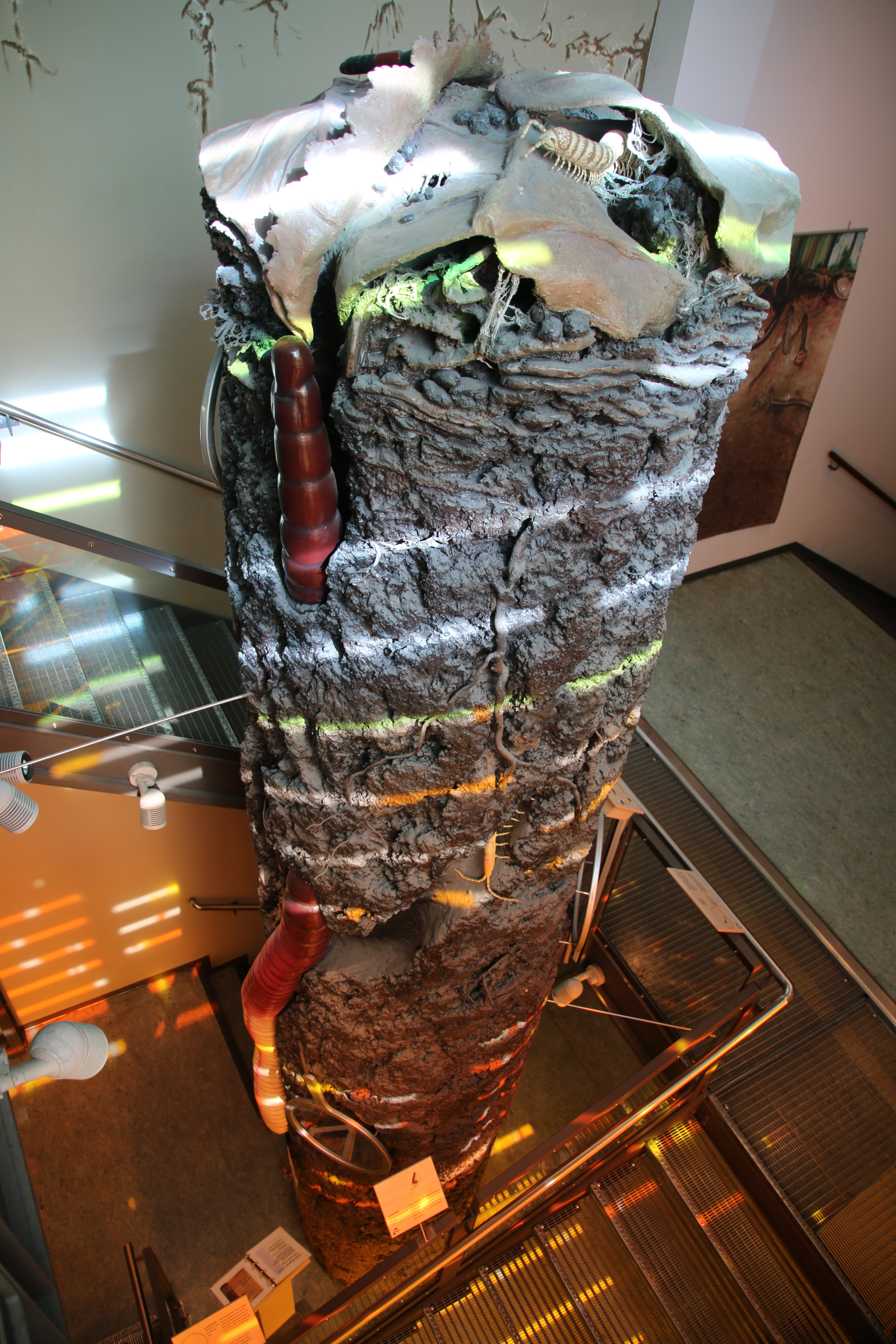
Floor column enlarged

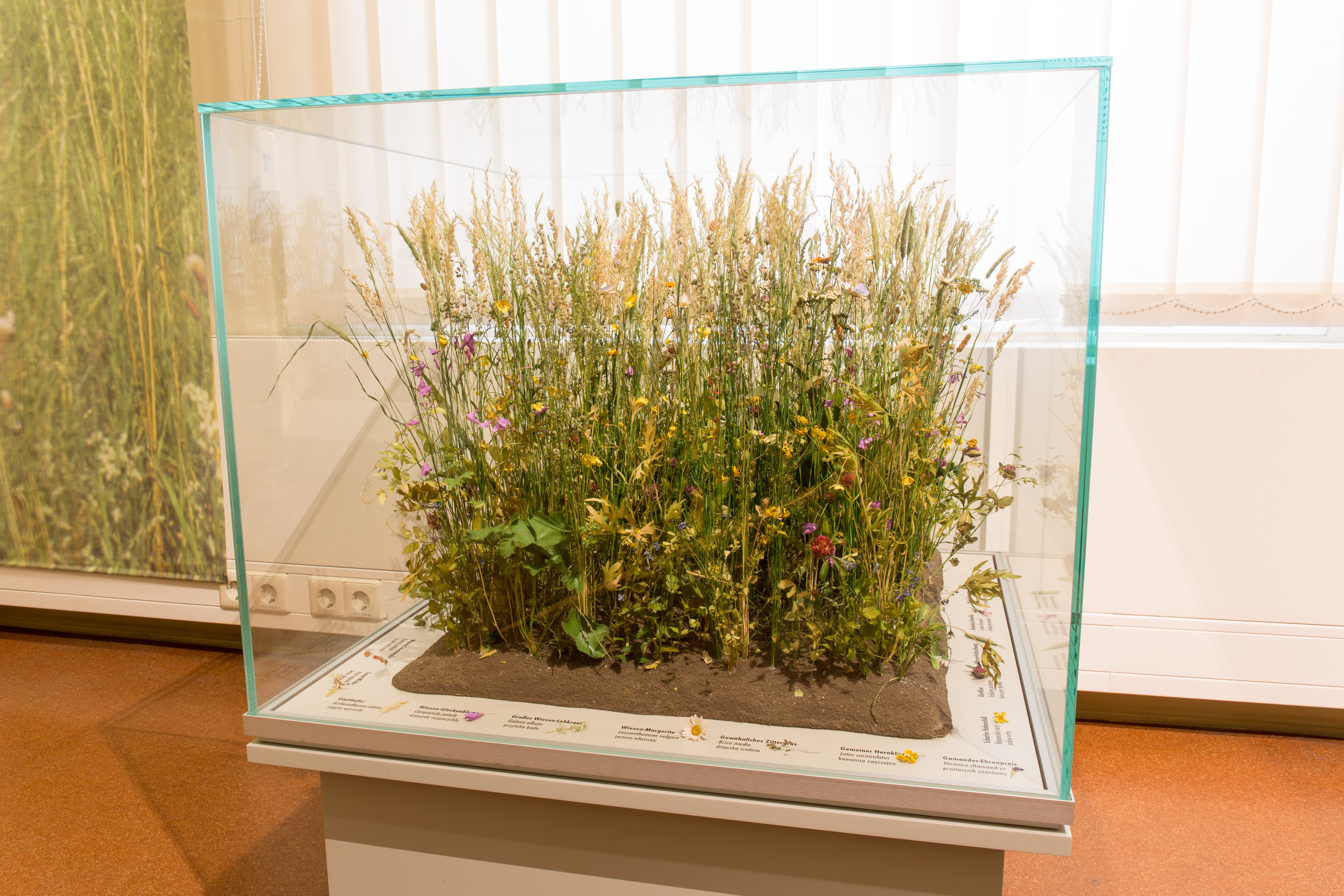
Preparation time for this Exponat: two years

The Senckenberg Museum for Natural History Görlitz (German: Senckenberg Museum für Naturkunde Görlitz), is a natural history museum in Görlitz, Saxony, Germany, with a focus on zoology, botany and geology. Since 2009, the museum has been part of the Senckenberg Gesellschaft für Naturforschung, headquartered in Frankfurt. The main field of research is soil biology.

== History ==
In 1811 the Ornithological Society of Görlitz was founded on the initiative of the cloth merchant Johann Gottlieb Kretzschmar and the actuary Giese. The Ornithological Society zu Görlitz was founded in 1823 as the Naturforschende Gesellschaft zu Görlitz; it was re-established in 1990 as the Naturforschende Gesellschaft der Oberlausitz. In the years 1858 to 1860, the Görlitz Society established its own museum on the centrally located Marienplatz on the former city moat area on the initiative of the physician and pharmacist W. J. Kleefeld and the Economic Commission Councillor Georg von Möllendorff. It was ceremoniously opened by Möllendorff on 26 October 1860. After the reconstruction of the museum building, President Walther Freise was able to reopen the collections in 1902. In 2008, the museum was accepted into the Gottfried Wilhelm Leibniz scientific community. Since 1 January 2009 it has belonged together with the Naturmuseum Senckenberg in Frankfurt am Main and the Senckenberg Natural History Collections Dresden to the network of the Senckenberg Nature Research Society.

== Lead ==
Reinhard Peck was appointed the first museum director of the Naturforschenden Gesellschaft in 1885. After him the botanist Hugo von Rabenau became museum director. After Freise's death in 1921, the biology teacher Oskar Herr took over the museum's management as a part-time member due to a shortage of money. From 1959 to 1995 Wolfram Dunger managed the Görlitz Natural History Museum. In 1995 he handed over the management of the museum to Willi Xylander.

== Collection Holdings ==
In 1819 the first preparations of 181 native land and water birds, 50 exotic birds and a collection of nests and eggs formed the "cabinet" of the Ornithological Society. In 1827 the collection was extended by 150 North American bird species (by G.S. Oppelt, Fairfield, Canada). In 1837 the coin collection was stolen and in the same year the mineral cabinets were opened. In 1846, three spacious rooms were rented per year for 50 Thalers on the first floor of Petersstraße 3 to house the collection. In the same year, visitors could marvel at the collections on two mornings of the week. To protect the collections from unauthorised persons, a padlock was attached to the "Kabineths-Thüre" in 1850. In 1858 the Society for Nature Research received a collection of African plants from Johann Christian Breutel from Herrnhut (an important cryptogamist). In the following year the collection of the entomologist and botanist August Kelch from Ratibor was bought for 200 thalers. In 1860 the pharmacist Reinhard Peck was appointed curator (first museum director in 1885). During his tenure, the collections experienced a significant upswing. The ornithologist and president of the Society Julius von Zittwitz was committed to the expansion of the collections and prepared 1500 birds for the Society himself. Museum director Hugo von Rabenau acquired the Central Asian herbarium of Sintenis and the extensive Schwarzsche Käf collection. In 1914, the museum received a gorilla from Cameroon as a gift from Hans Schäfer, a member of the society. In the same year, Bruno Hecker's egg collection (with 1400 eggs from 363 Central European bird species) was donated to the society. The bird collection of Robert von Loebenstein, one of the most important private bird collections in Upper Lusatia, was also donated to the Society in 1930. However, it no longer found a place in the premises of the museum and was therefore housed in the former Vogtshof (at St. Peter's Church).

As of 2014, the collections contain around 6.5 million insects, mites, millipedes, snails, mussels, vertebrates (including 30,000 skulls), plants (around 375,000 specimens), mushrooms and thousands of minerals, rocks and fossils. The objects in the collection are the subject of scientific research by more than 40 museum researchers. The museum has a special scientific library with approximately 151,000 media units (mainly documents from the fields of zoology, soil zoology, botany, ecology, geology and palaeontology). In addition to specialist literature for the research work of scientists, it also offers generally understandable literature from the fields of natural sciences and the history of the region and can be used by the public.

== Permanent Collections ==
The museum displays its exhibits on 1200 m^{2} of exhibition space:

- Dioramas designed close to nature show specially prepared habitats of Upper Lusatia with their typical plants and animals (wolf, sea eagle) – from the pine heaths in the north to the Zittau mountains in the south.
- The geology exhibition shows the eventful history of the region: volcanoes, beaches and coal forests. But the Ice Age also shaped the landscape, as the finds of Mammut and Auerochse prove.
- The edaphone of the soil is shown on a 30-fold enlarged column of soil.
- In the rainforest and savannah exhibitions, large and small, well-known and unknown inhabitants are presented: from the beak to the finger animal, from the harpy to the ostrich, from the gorilla to the tiger.
- A vivarium with 70 living animal species from the rainforests and native regions in 12 elaborately designed landscape basins on an area of 100 m^{2} completes the other permanent exhibitions. Visitors are offered regular show feedings. Rarities such as the black freshwater stingray from Brazil, Madagascan tomato frogs or the Senegal flounderfish, a "living fossil", can be seen. But also native species like grass snake or the eurasian harvest mouse are represented.

In addition, the museum offers play areas, multimedia, interactive learning opportunities and video films. Audio guides in German, English and Polish are available free of charge at the box office. The exhibitions are accessible to disabled visitors. Guided tours, children's events and birthdays can be obtained from the museum's educational department.

=== Special exhibitions ===
Two special exhibitions each extend the museum's programme. The last special exhibitions were:

- T. rex & Other Cool Heads – Form and Function of the Skulls (from 8 September 2018)
- The Art of Botanical Painting – Watercolours by Tetiana Laskarevska (18 August to 18 November 2018)
- Tricture 3D – Your journey to prehistoric times! (from 20 January to 12 August 2018)
- Since 2011, a temporary exhibition in the entrance hall has provided information about the 200-year history of the Naturforschenden Gesellschaft der Oberlausitz and the Museum für Naturkunde in Görlitz.
- Mechanical animal world (from 13 May 2017 to 15 October 2017)

=== Travelling exhibitions ===
In recent years, the museum has developed about a dozen international travelling exhibitions and thus presented its own research internationally.

These include

- The Thin Skin of the Earth – Our Soils (Chamber of Life: Soil Animals and their Biology, Chamber of Crumbs: Soil Types – Their Composition and Use, Chamber of Knowledge: Soils, Soil Biodiversity and Man, Chamber of Secrets: Endangering Soils)
- Via Regia – Street of Species (exhibition shows the role of different animal and plant species as commodities, food, hunting goods, exotic attractions and stowaways on the old Via Regia)
- Wolves (using the example of the Lusatian wolves to provide scientifically sound information on the biology and ecology of wild wolves)
- In the Land of Grasses and Wild Horses – Biological Research in Mongolia
- Float. Live. – Animated drops of water (shows in an oversized drop of water film footage of various "floating creatures" and large photos of plankton and large-format reproductions from "Art Forms of Nature" by Ernst Haeckel on banners)
- Photo exhibitions: Life under Water 2012, 2014 and 2016
- Schwerelos – The World in Water: Photographs by Armin and Birgit Trutnau
- Photo exhibition: Giantischklein (scanning electron microscopic animal photographs from the scientific work of the museum)
- Out Of Focus: Nature Photographs by Axel Gebauer

In 2018 where more than ten travelling exhibitions on tour from Görlitz.

== Images ==
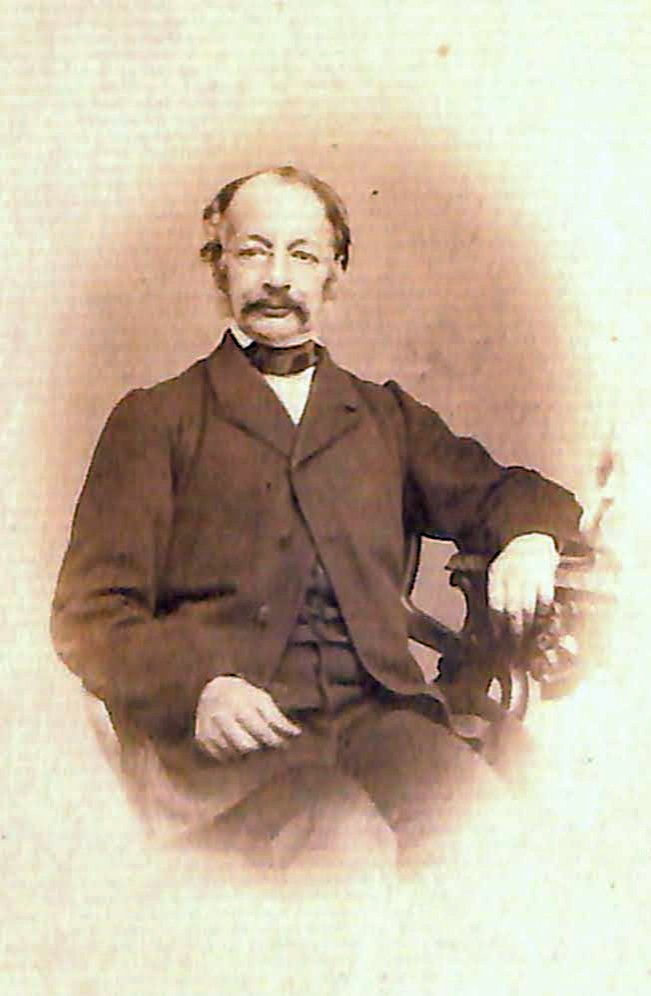
Reinhard Peck, first director

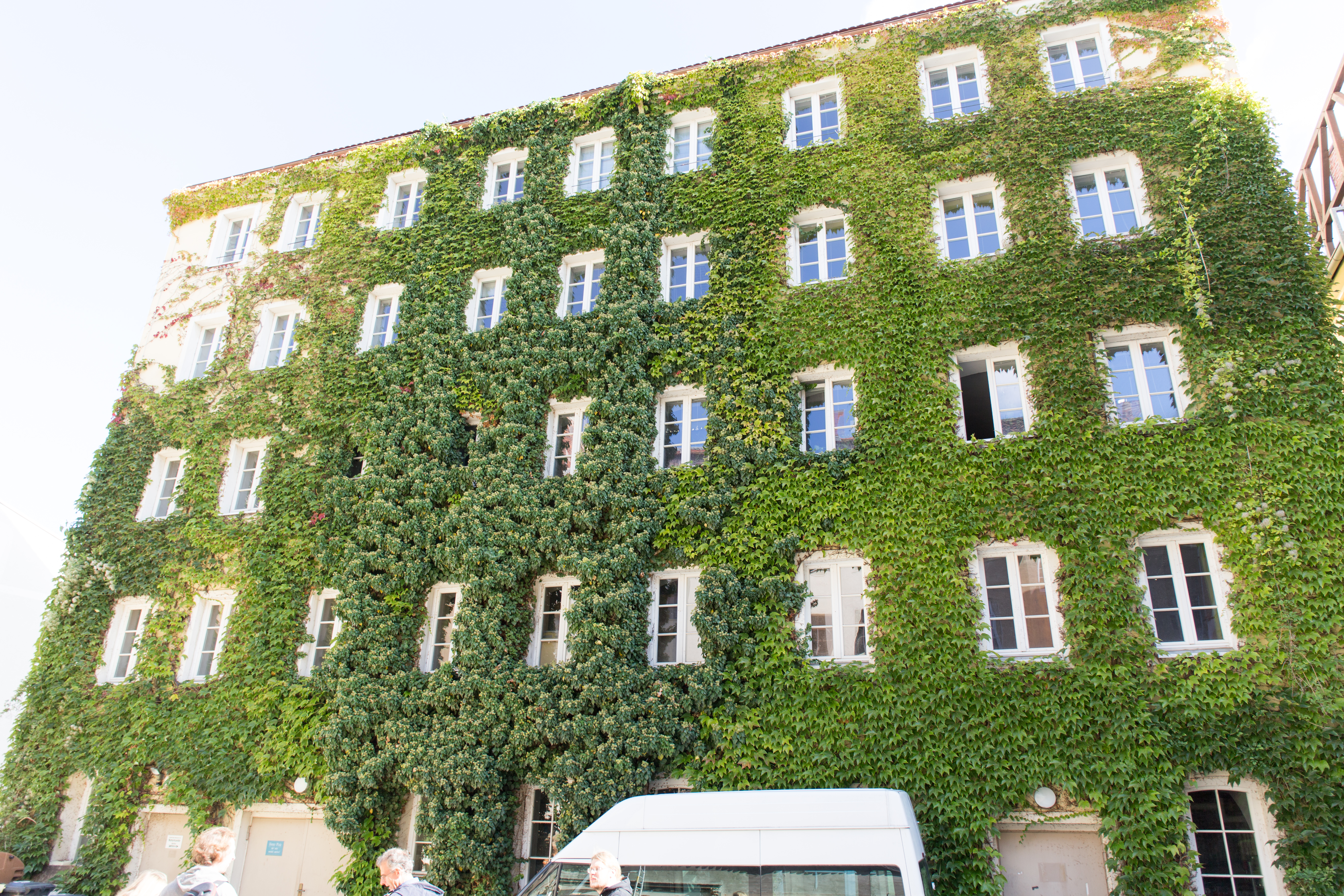
the Herbarium´s Building

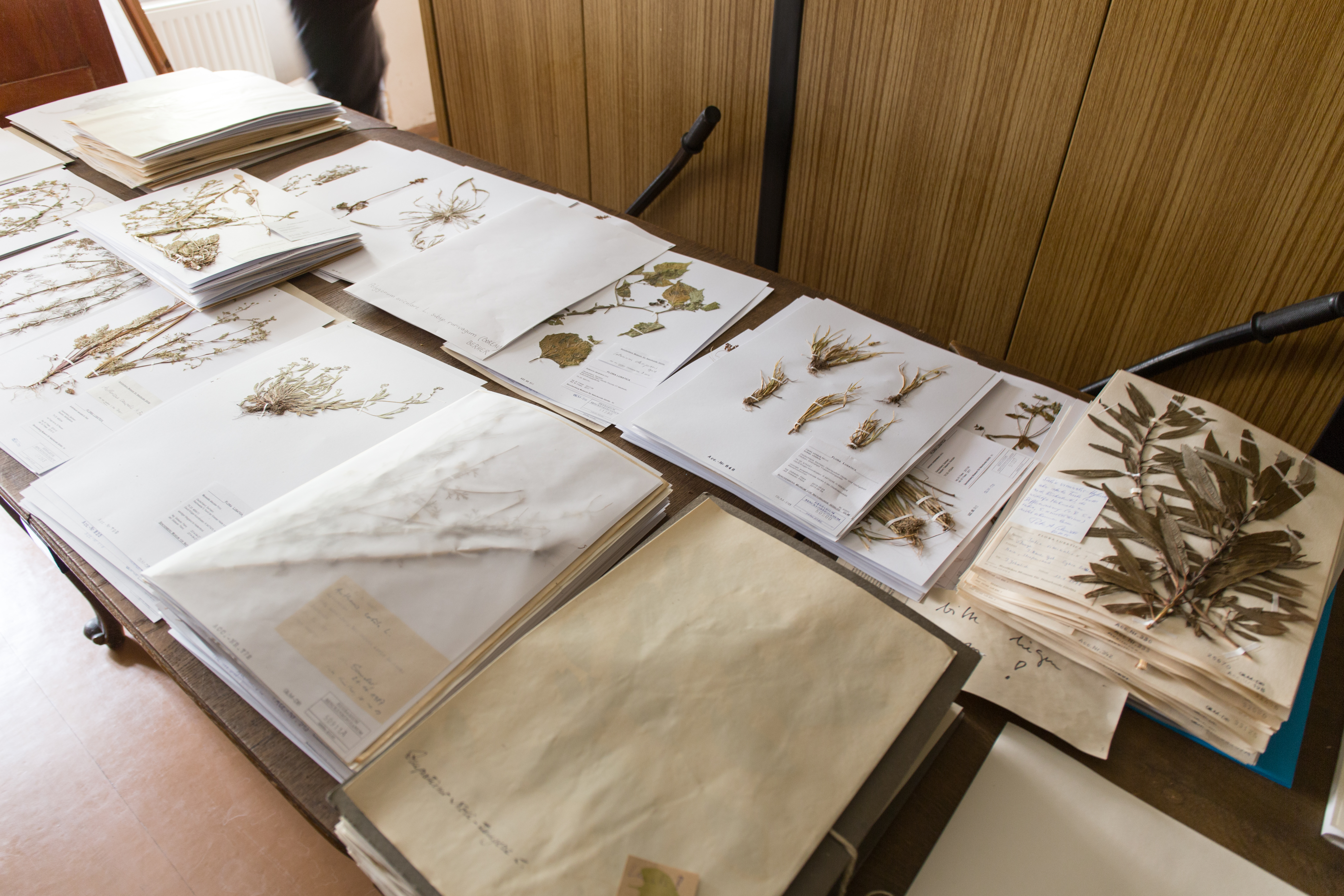
Impression from the Herbarium

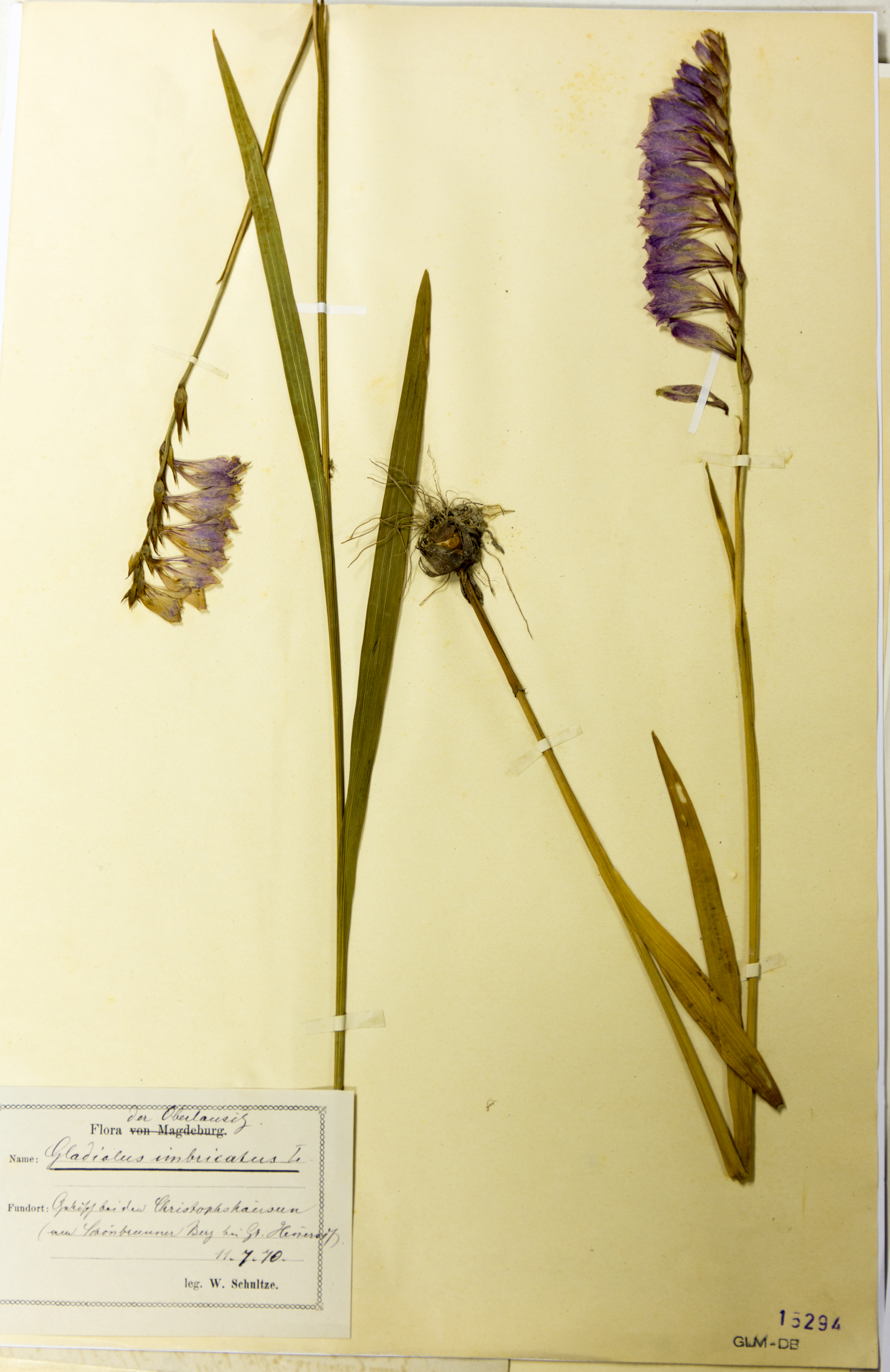
Herbarium

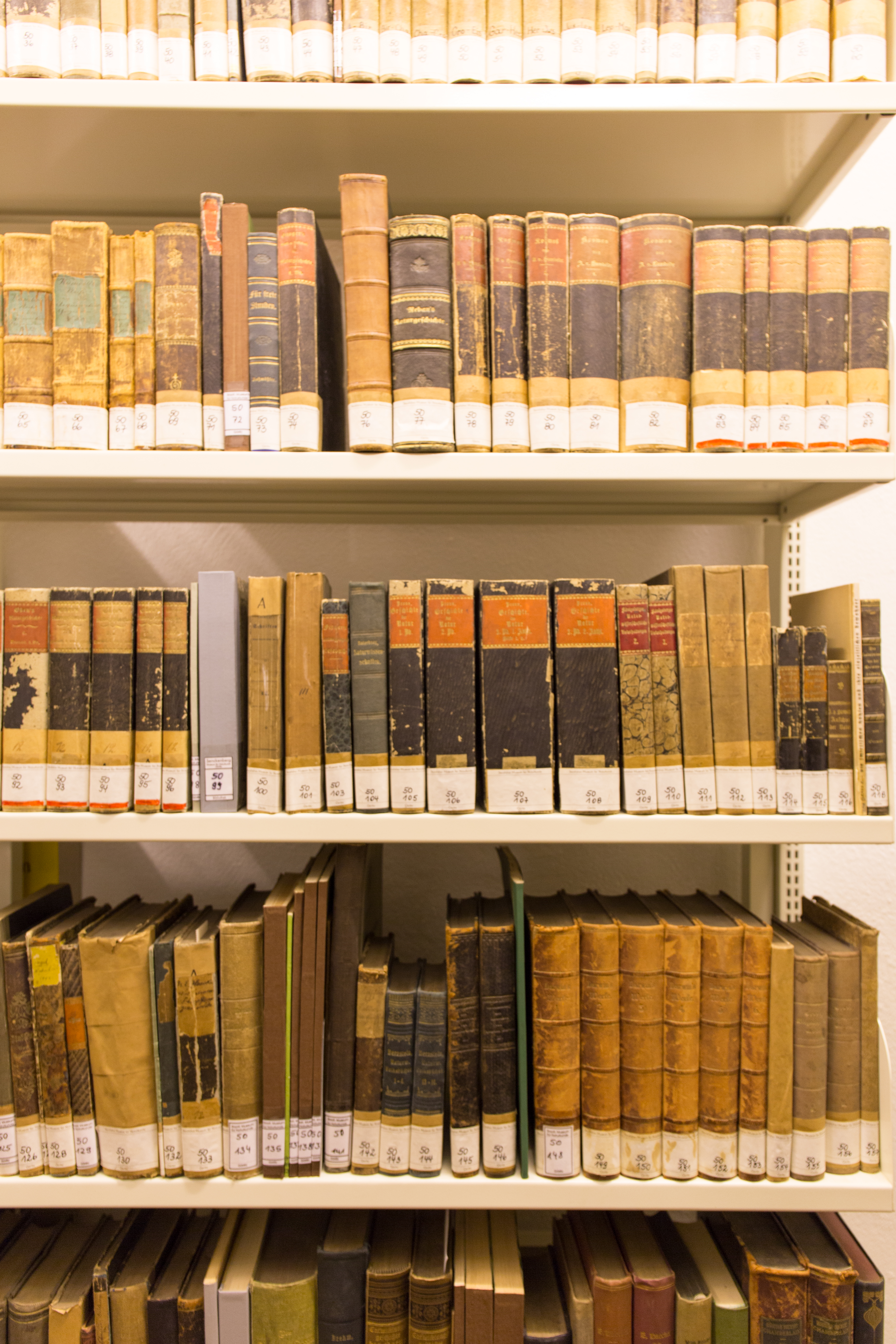
The Library

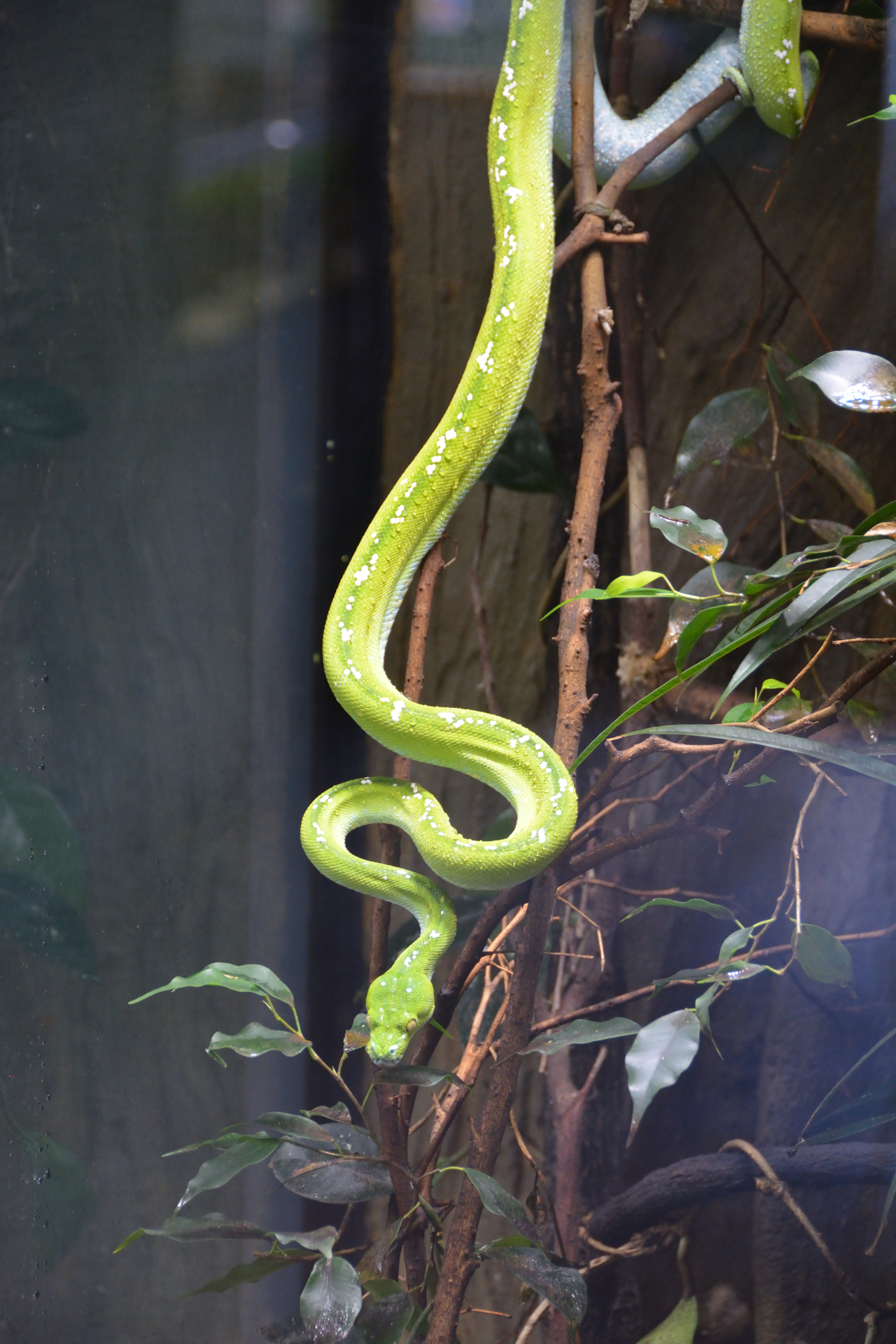
Green tree python at the Vivarium

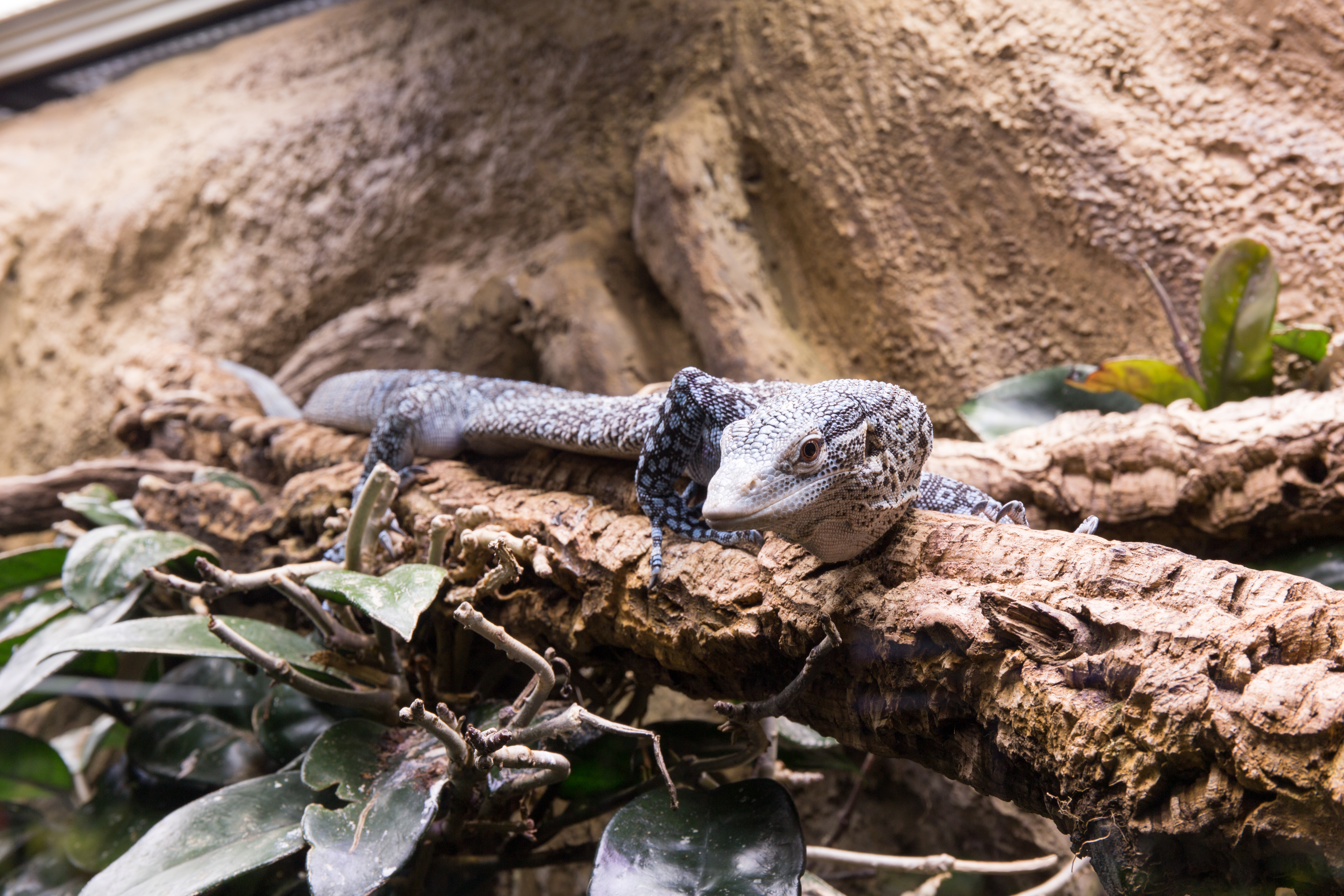
Blue tree monitor at the Vivarium

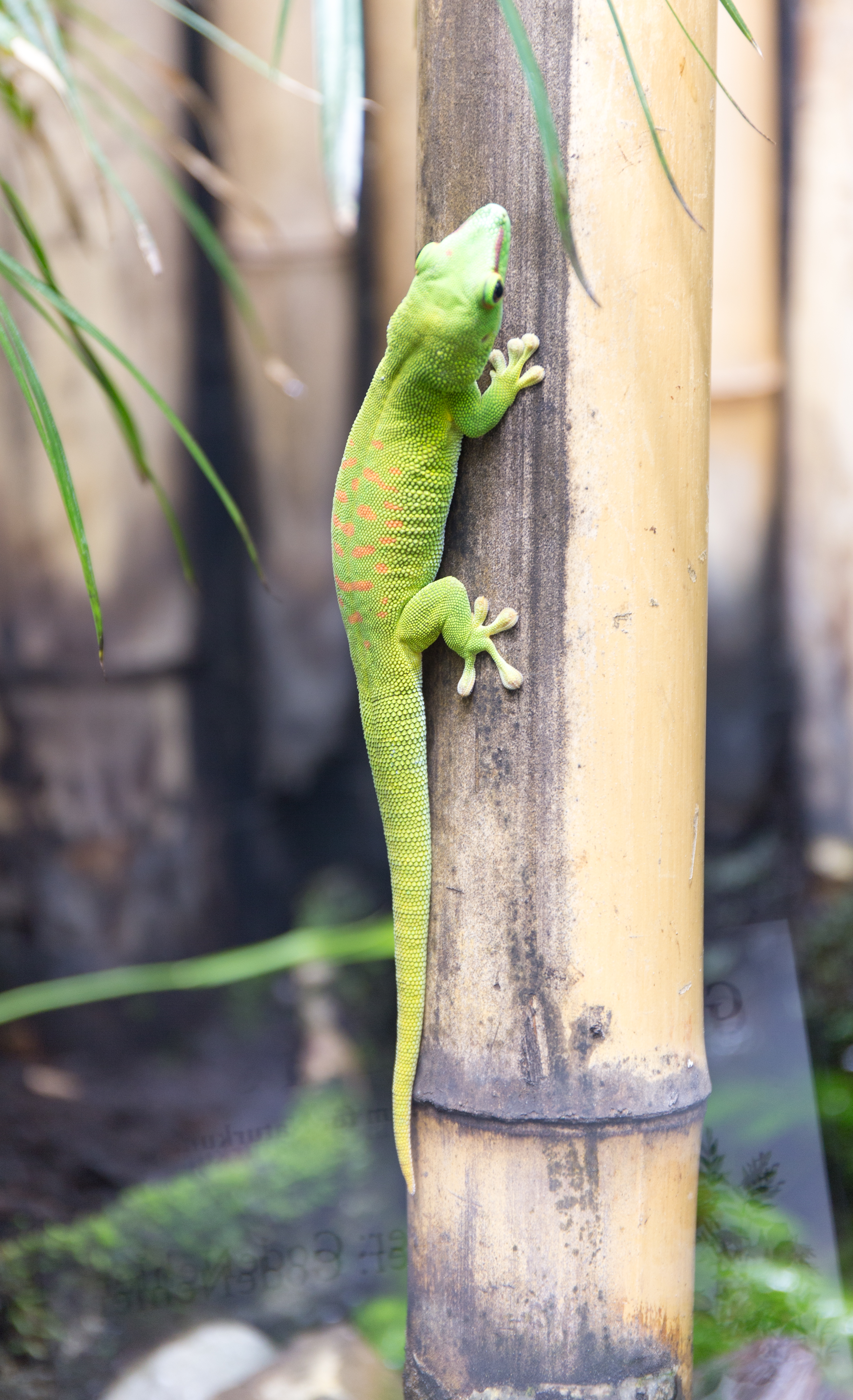
Madagascar giant day gecko

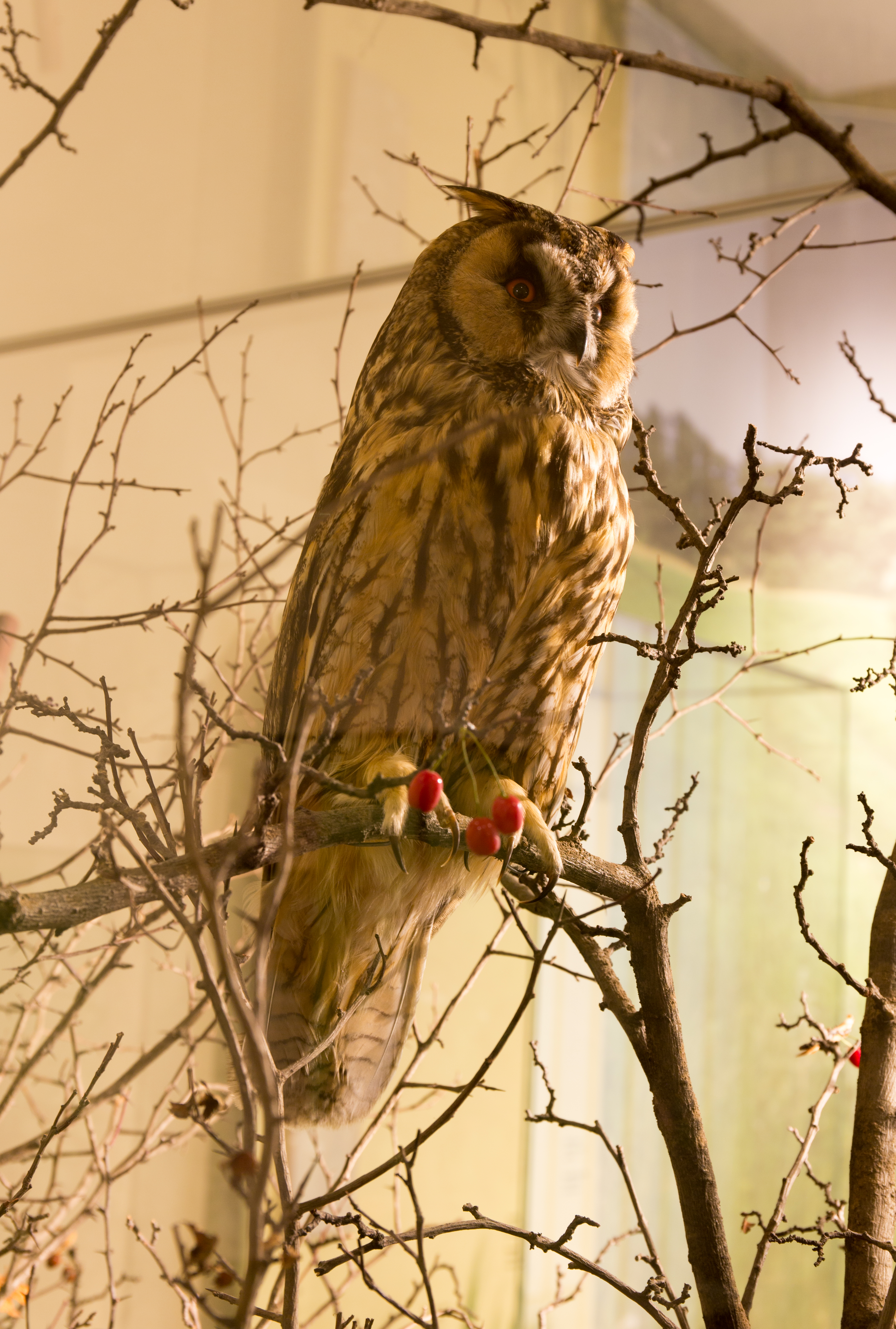
Long-eared owl

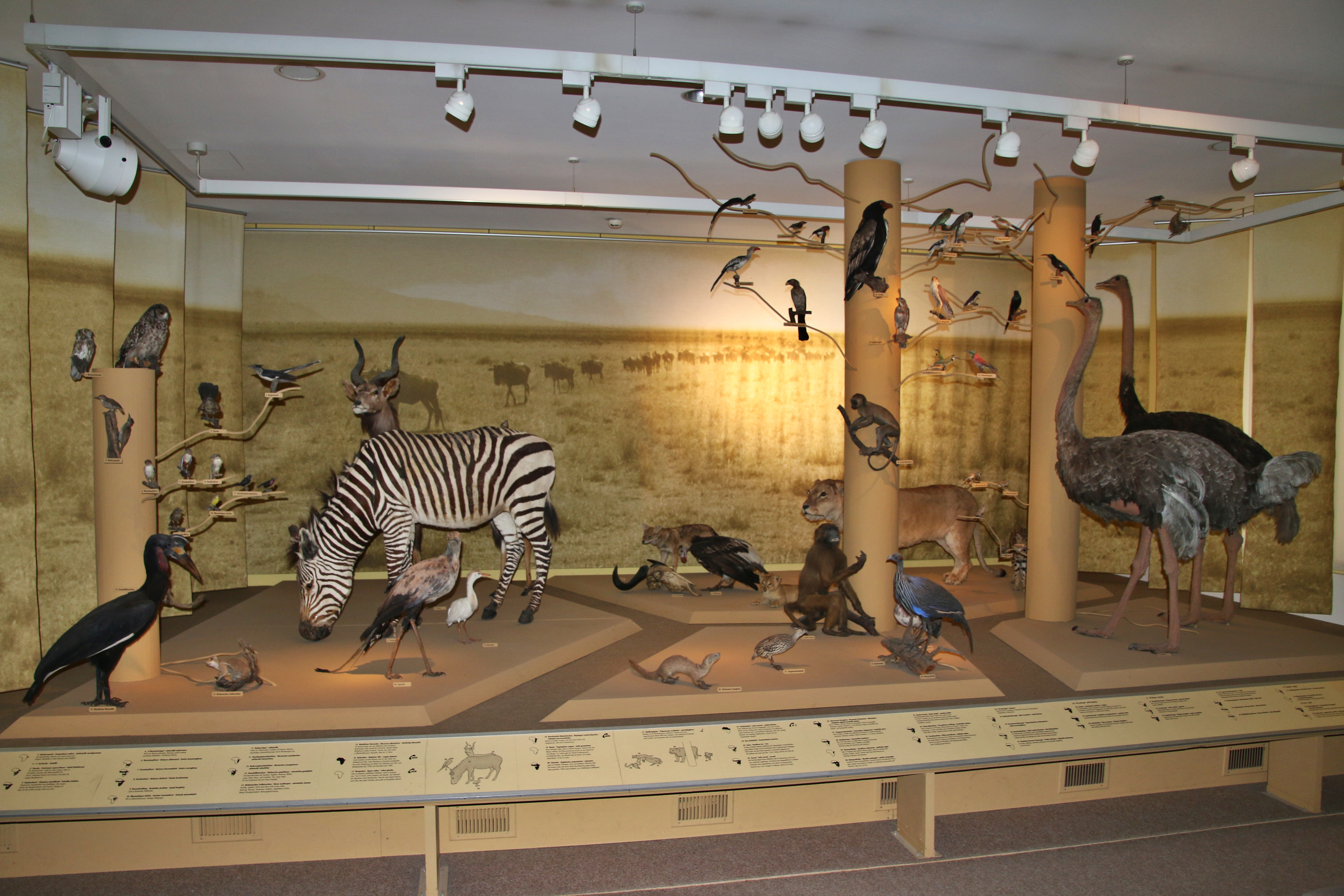
permanent exhibit about african wildlife

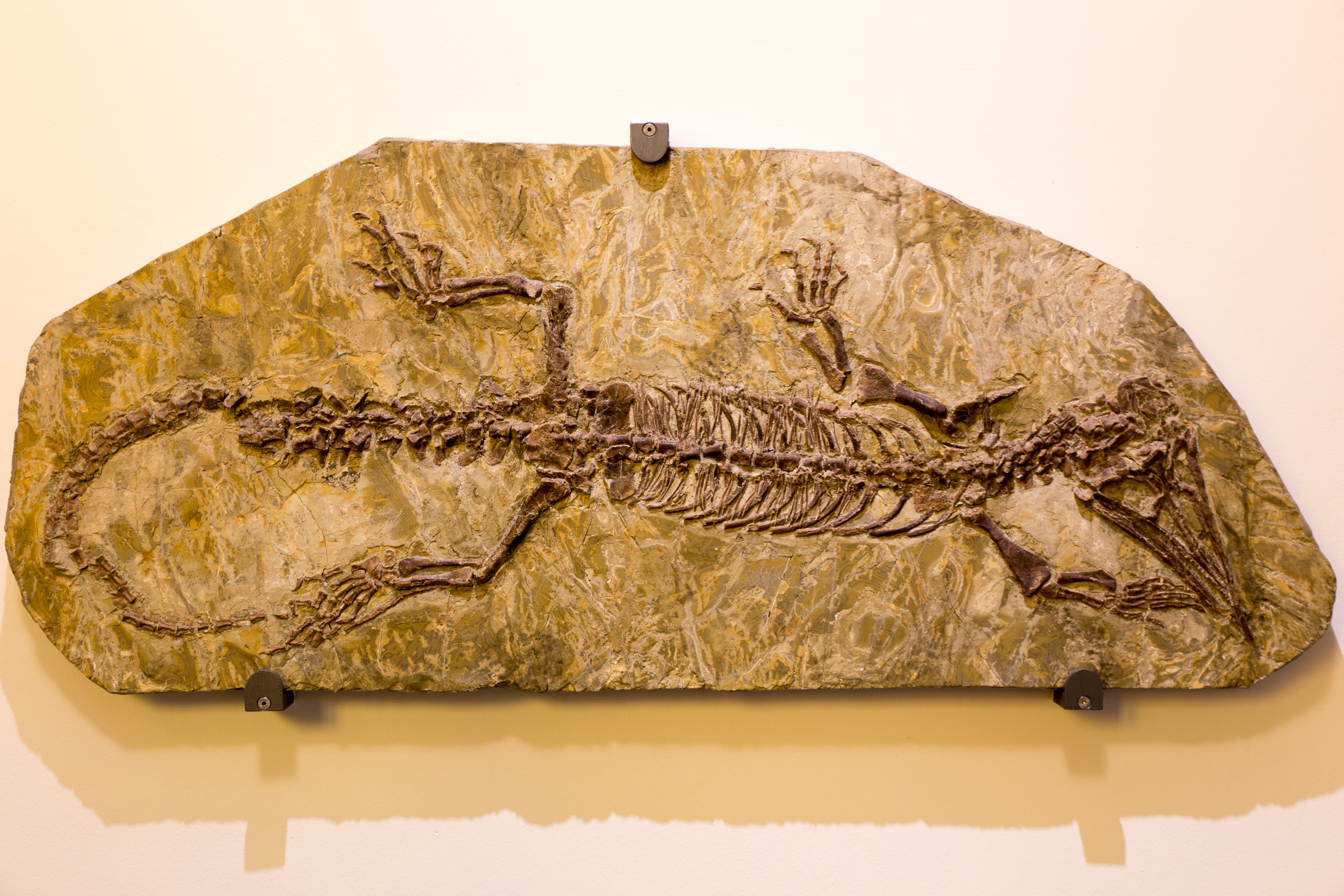
Fossil reptile

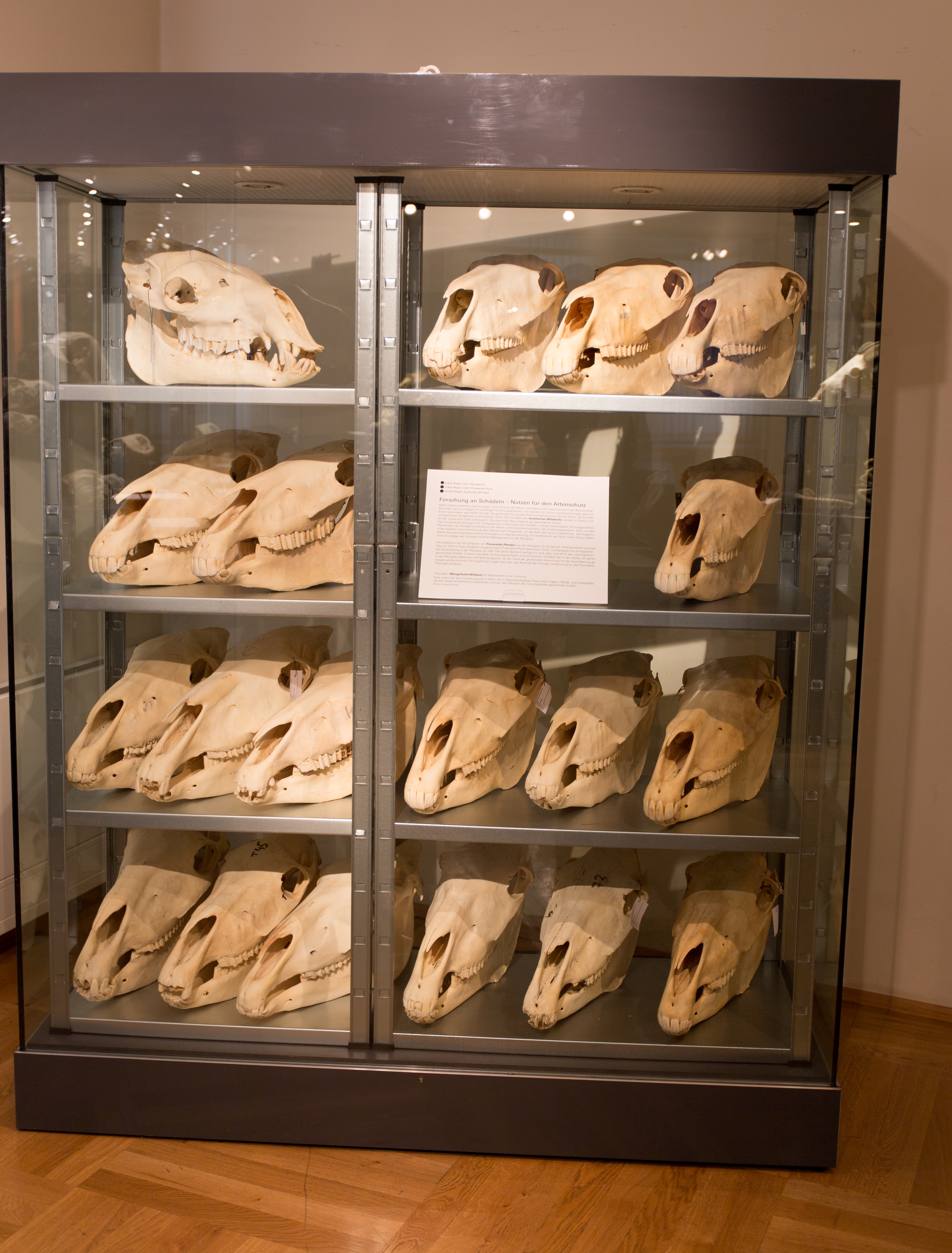
Mastozoology collection

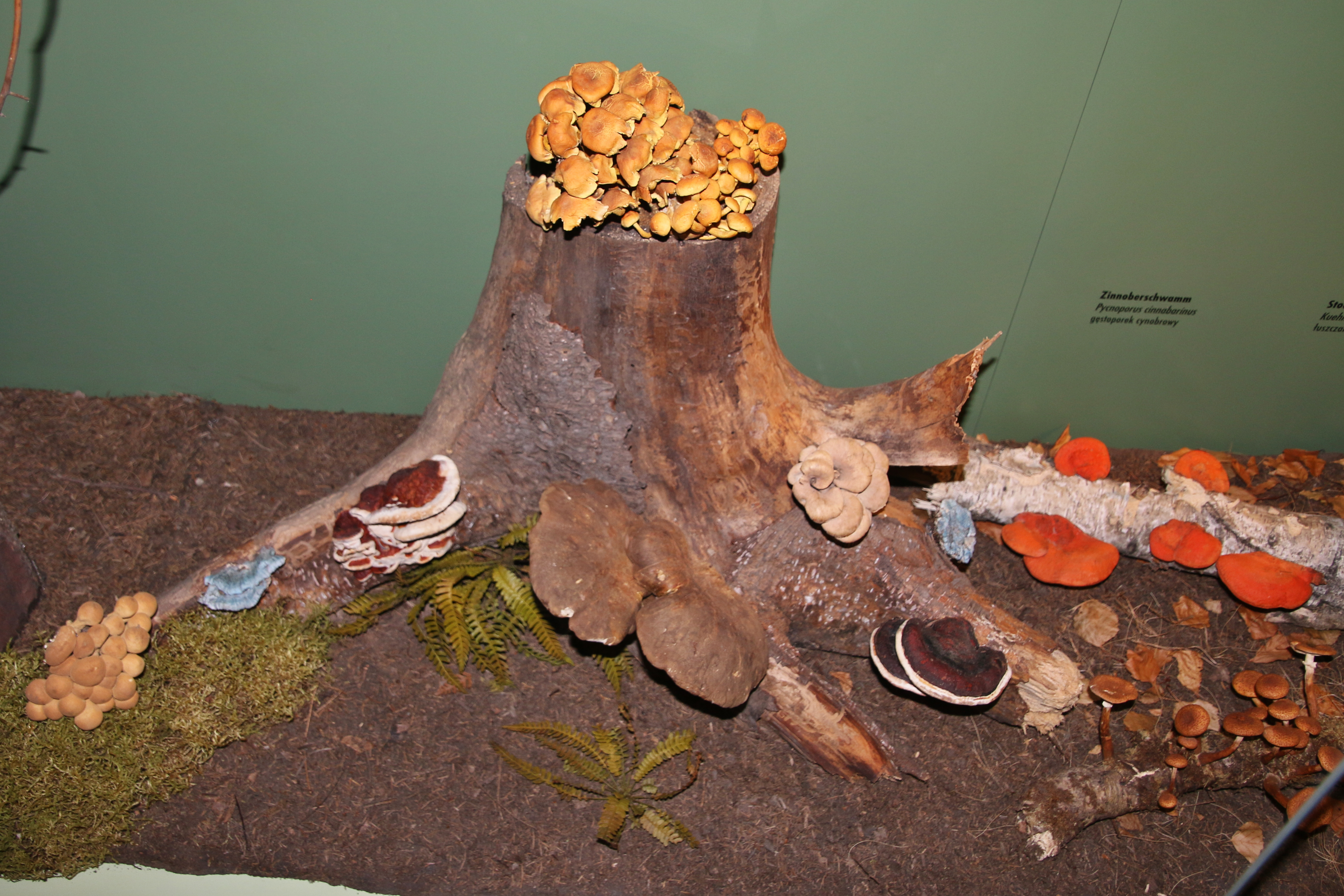
Diorama showcasing fungi

== Bibliography ==
- Dr Axel Christian: ACARI – BIBLIOGRAPHIA ACAROLOGICA, Görlitz, Germany ISSN 1618-8977
- Prof. Dr. Willi Xylander: SOIL ORGANISMS, Görlitz, Germany ISSN 1864-6417
- Prof. Dr. Willi Xylander: PECKIANA, Görlitz, Germany ISSN 1618-1735
- Prof. Dr. Willi Xylander: SYNOPSES ON PALAEARCTIC COLLEMBOLA, Görlitz, Germany ISSN 0373-7586

== Literature ==
Julia Hammerschmidt: 200 Years of Natural History Society and Museum of Natural History Görlitz. Senckenberg Museum of Natural History Görlitz, Görlitz, Germany 2011 (PDF; 4,5 MB, german).
