= Jesús María District, Lima =

District of Lima, Peru

Coordinates: 12°04′42″S 77°02′53″W

Jesús María
- District
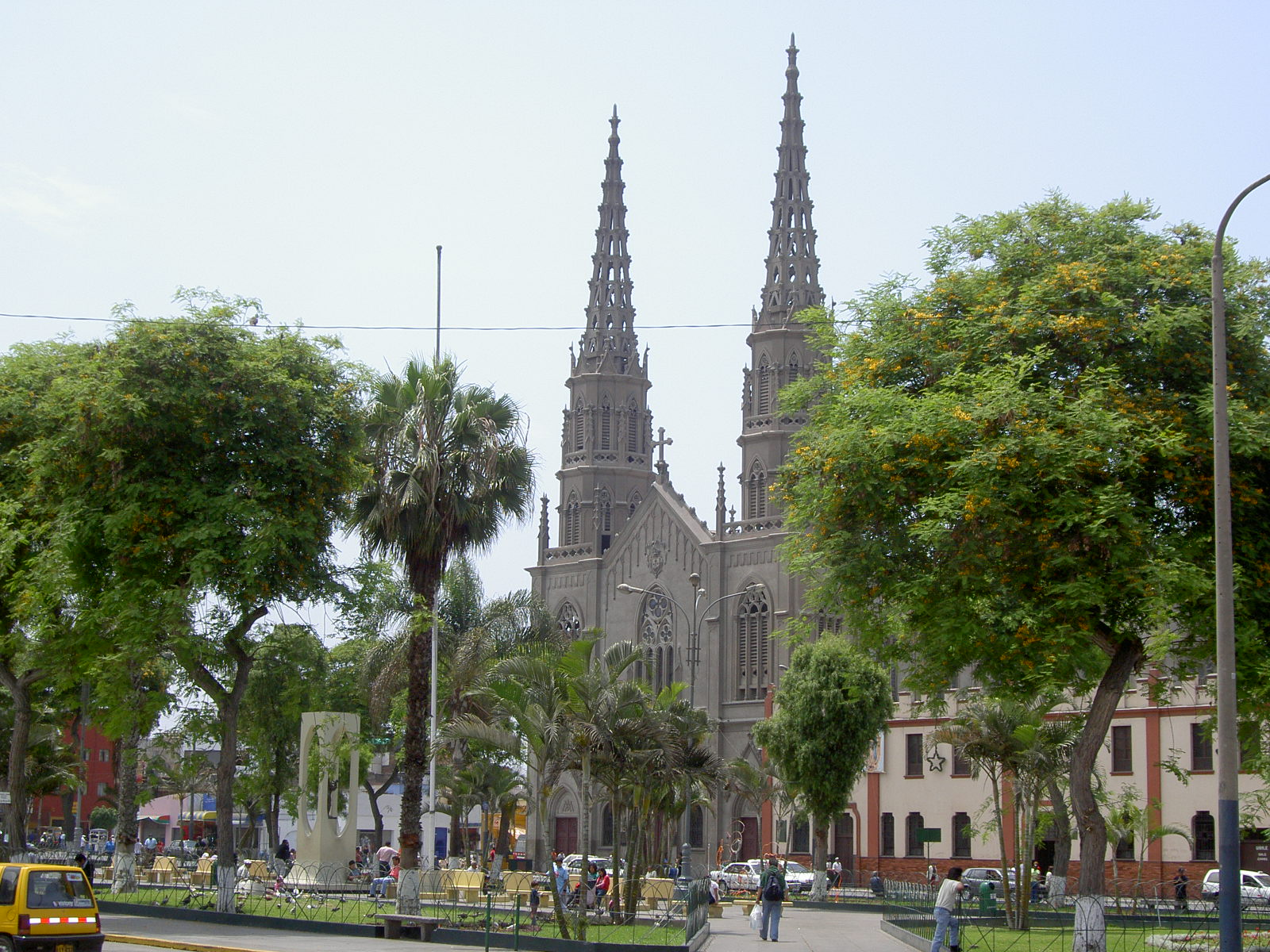
- San José square and church

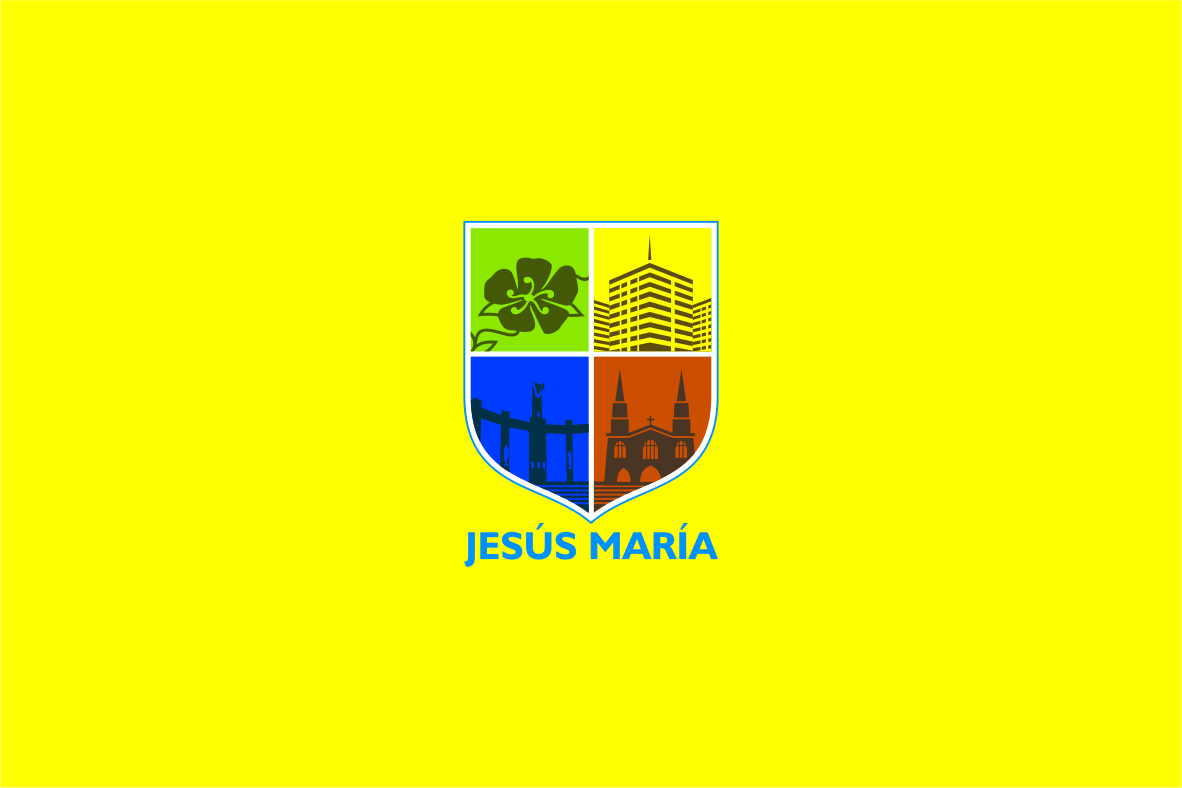
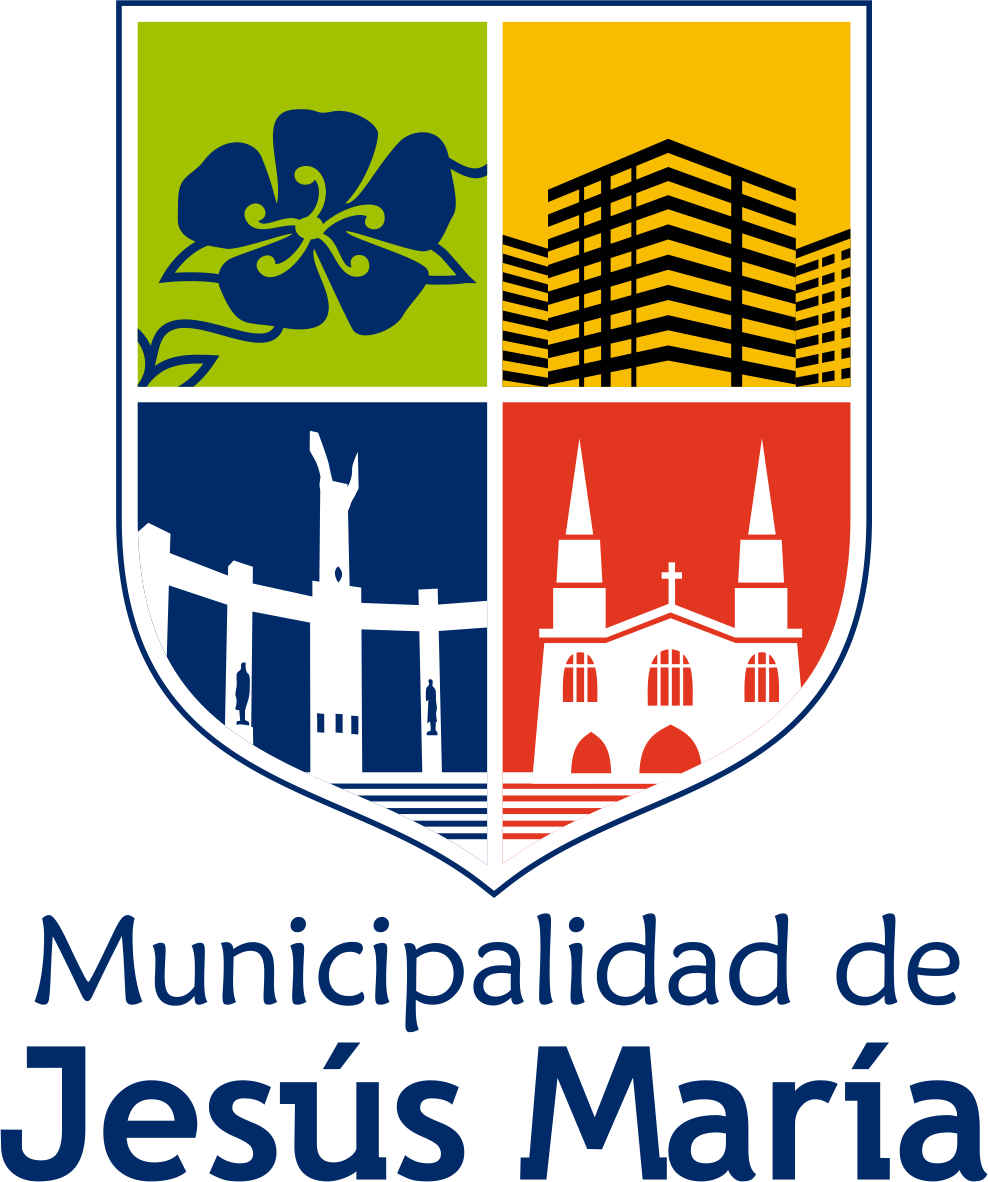
- Flag Coat of arms

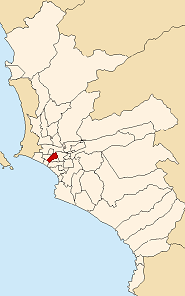
- Location of Jesús María in Peru
- Country: Peru
- Department: Lima
- Province: Lima
- Founded: December 17, 1963
- Subdivisions: 1 populated centre

Government
  - Mayor: Jesús Galvez

Area
  - Total: 4.57 km^{2} (1.76 sq mi)

Population (2022)
  - Total: 83,905
  - Density: 18,400/km^{2} (47,600/sq mi)
- Time zone: UTC-5 (PET)
- UBIGEO: 150113
- Website: munijesusmaria.gob.pe

Jesús María (Spanish: [xeˈsus maˈɾia]; lit. 'Jesus-Mary') is a district of Lima, Peru. Located to the south of the city's historic centre, the area was originally populated by agricultural estates, after which it began a period of urbanisation during the early 20th century, becoming a neighbourhood of Lima until its establishment as a district of its own in 1963.

Jesús María is an upper class, high-density district and it usually ranks in the top districts with the best quality of life in Peru with a Human Development Index (HDI) of 0.8372 (2019), lower only than the districts of La Molina and Lince. It is bordered by the districts of Pueblo Libre and Breña District on the west, downtown Lima on the north and east, Lince District on the southeast, and San Isidro and Magdalena del Mar on the south.

== Etymology ==
According to historian Fernando Flores Zúñiga, the name originates from the monastic community of Jesus, Mary, and Joseph, made up of Capuchin nuns who arrived in Lima from Madrid and took up residence in the area starting in 1718, making the place their headquarters. Sometime in the 18th century, the Capuchin nuns of the community of Jesus, Mary, and Joseph took possession of the agricultural lands in the area, which acquired the name over time, although the reference to Saint Joseph was dropped.

== History ==
In 1440, the area was under the influence of both the chieftanships of Guatca, Maranga and the kingdom of Cuismancu, two of the oldest settlements of the Rímac Valley. Both societies developed a complex network of ceremonial and administrative centres, shown by the number of huacas in the area. Of these, one of the most prominent was the Huaca Universidad (also known as Huaca Santa Beatriz or Huaca Grande), located near the National University of San Marcos' Museum of Natural History and bordered by Rebagliati, Cueto, Coronel Zegarra and Montero streets, as well as Arenales and Salaverry avenues. It was gradually destroyed between 1935 and 1950 and replaced by Edgardo Rebagliati Martins National Hospital.

Another important site was the Huaca Los Patricios, located between the present-day Estados Unidos and Cáceres streets in the district, in the area that now belongs to the Los Patricios passage and the zone adjacent to Parque 13 de Diciembre. This archaeological monument was destroyed around 1943 as a consequence of the area's urbanisation process. Similarly, the Huaca Palermo was located in the area of the current intersection of Horacio Urteaga and General Santa Cruz avenues, the site of the district's former Palermo cinema. This huaca was also destroyed around 1943, making way for the urban infrastructure that no longer exists; the Aires de Palermo residential building now stands on its site. Finally, the Huaca Matalechuza (also known as Matalechucita) was located on the 19th block of Salaverry Avenue, near its intersection with the Avenida del Ejército, in an area that corresponded to the former Matamula Forest (also called Matalechuza Forest). This site was linked to the Huatica valley and was destroyed in 1951 to make way for the current green area of Heroes of Independence Park.

=== Spanish period ===
In the aftermath of the Spanish conquest of the Inca Empire, the area formed part of estates Matalechuzas and Matalechucitas, the latter of which was smaller in size, and the lands known as Jesús María, which together totaled approximately 240 hectares. Under the Spanish, the area was irrigated by the now-vanished Huatica River, and became generally known as Matalechuzas. The Huatica passed through what eventually became La Victoria, and its main subsidiary canal coursed down what is today Salaverry Avenue and, ultimately, reached the sea at Marbella in Magdalena del Mar.

One theory about the origin of Matalechuzas' name suggests that, from the 16th century onward, there was a gradual elimination of the owls that inhabited the area. According to Spanish chroniclers, this bird was highly valued as an oracle in pre-Hispanic times, and several huacas (sacred sites) dedicated to its worship were associated with it, which were also gradually destroyed. Over time, the territory was transformed into farmland, primarily dedicated to sugarcane and fruit orchards. Thus, Matalechuzas became the most important plantation in the area, owned by Martín de Ituráin around the 17th century.

Regarding Matalechucitas, this was a smaller orchard or farm known to have existed since the 17th century. The orchard had several owners until Manuel Ignacio de Vivanco finally took possession of it. Decades later, Reynaldo de Vivanco put it up for sale. On the other hand, the lands called Jesús María were a farm located next to the Santa Beatriz area.

=== Republican period ===
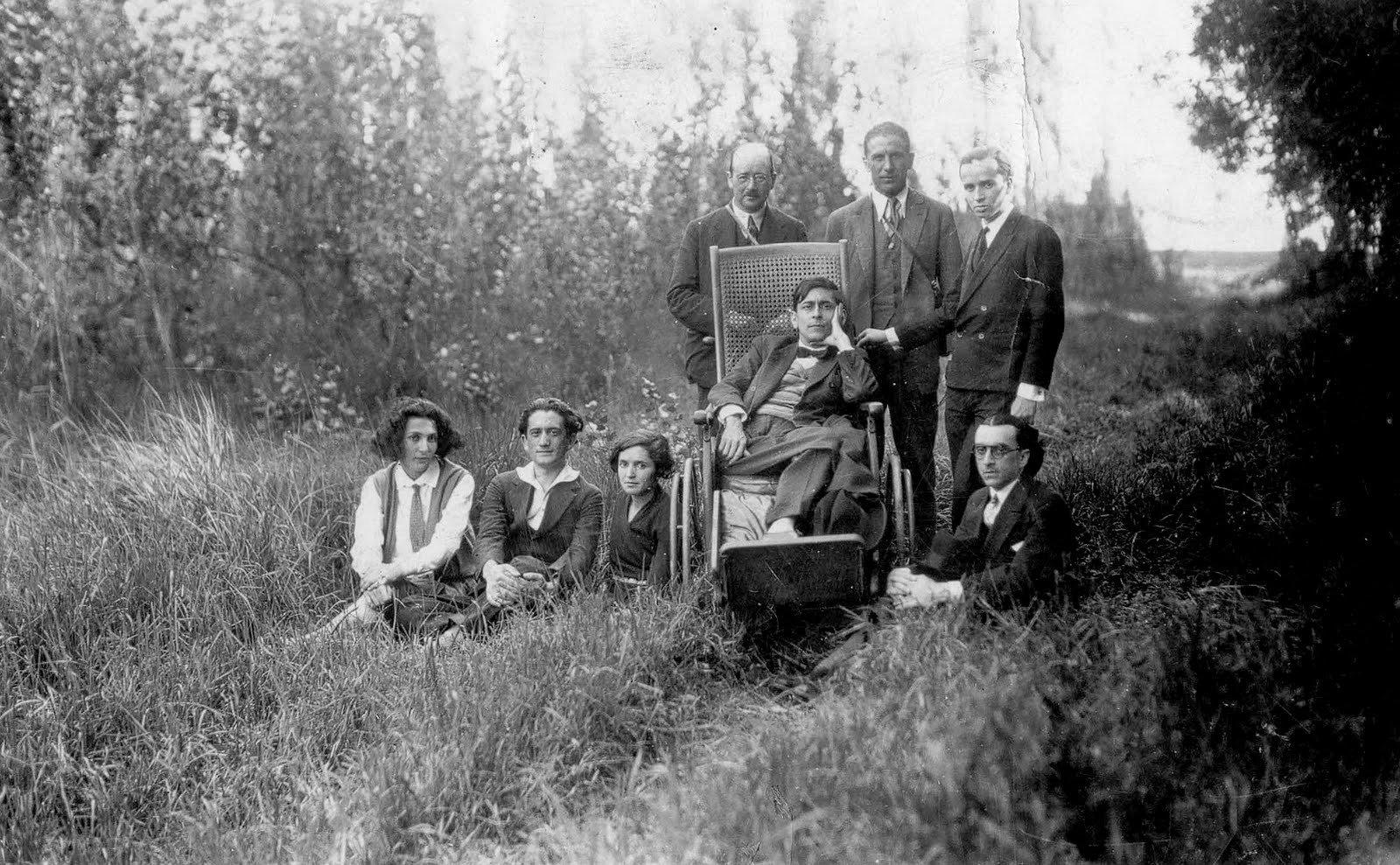
Matamula (or Matalechuzas) forest in 1929. Pictured are José Carlos Mariátegui and acquaintances.

Following independence, Matalechuzas came to be owned by Manuel Ignacio de Vivanco. Following his death, the estate was inherited by his son, Reynaldo de Vivanco. He would later die fighting at the Morro Solar during the War of the Pacific. Subsequently, the Olavegoya family acquired the land, and at the beginning of the 20th century, they began the urban expansion of the former estate.

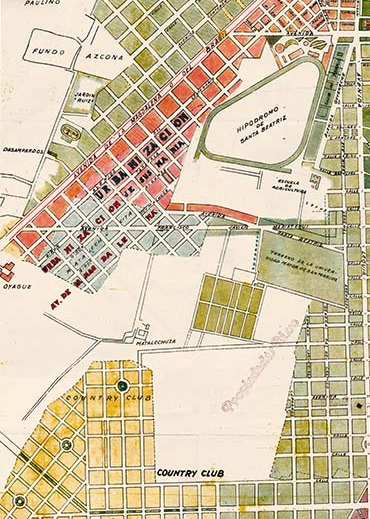
Map of Jesús María (then part of Lima District) in 1927.

What would later become the district's area maintained an agricultural character until the beginning of the 1920s, its territory belonging to the districts of Lima, Pueblo Libre, and Magdalena del Mar. Under the presidency of Augusto B. Leguía, the National School of Agriculture and Veterinary Science developed a project to urbanise the area, which proposed some thirty-two city blocks between what would later become Arenales and Francisco Javier Mariátegui avenues. In 1930, local residents organised a housing association, creating a committee supporting the creation of a district the following year, chaired by Jacob Alavedra and Enrique Mafuelo Cáceres, a prominent resident at the time.

The inauguration of Salaverry Avenue in the 1940s granted the area more autonomy and, at the same time, the Campo de Marte—a park that replaced Santa Beatriz Hippodrome—began to take shape as a green space and aesthetically pleasing feature for the emerging residential area. Several important figures settled in the area, developing residential estates in different styles, including Neo-Moorish, Spanish Revival, and styles used in the United States. In addition to these buildings, gardens, balconies and decorated windows were also built to accompany them. At that time, several members of the Japanese immigrant community in Peru settled in the area, bringing commerce and economic dynamism, as they were the ones who opened the first businesses in the area, thus giving the future district a commercial tone that it maintains to this day. The community would be targeted during World War II due to the anti-Japanese sentiment of the time, notably in the 1940 race riots that coincided with an earthquake.

The 1950s saw the construction of government buildings at Salaverry avenue, including the Ministry of Labour, Ministry of Health, and the Employee Hospital. The inauguration of San Felipe avenue would complete the local urban landscape, along with the houses and residences on Estados Unidos, Inca Rípac, and Sánchez Cerro streets.

=== History as a district ===
The Peruvian Congress approved Law No. 1,4763 of December 27, 1955, which elevated Jesús María to a district, but it was not put into effect. It was ratified by President Fernando Belaúnde Terry on December 17, 1963, formally creating the district. Its first mayor, José Benavides Muñoz, was elected in November 1966.

In the 1960s and 1970s, the newly created district acquired a more heterogeneous profile with the emergence of more popular and small middle-class areas. The Hippodrome of San Felipe, which succeeded that of Santa Beatriz, was demolished to make way for a residential complex of the same name. It was commissioned by President Fernando Belaúnde and designed by a team headed in part by architects Enrique Ciriani, Jorge Páez, Jorge Bernuy, and Nikita Smirnoff Bracamonte, designed to combine a high residential density with ample green space, and shopping, banking, and schooling. It is widely considered the cornerstone of Jesús María's middle-class identity.

Today, Jesús María is an upper class, highly residential district, home to 75,359 people. The district usually ranks in the top four districts with the best quality of life in Lima. The district's central location and proximity to San Isidro and Miraflores, have also contributed to it becoming an increasingly popular residential option. Jesús María is experiencing a housing and construction boom, and many casonas (older large, luxury homes) are being replaced with high-rise apartments and condominiums. The number of high-rise buildings being constructed has led to concerns by some residents of the district, who have voiced concerns regarding zoning and material damages. Some houses have been preserved as businesses or government installations, such as the City Hall.

== Politics ==
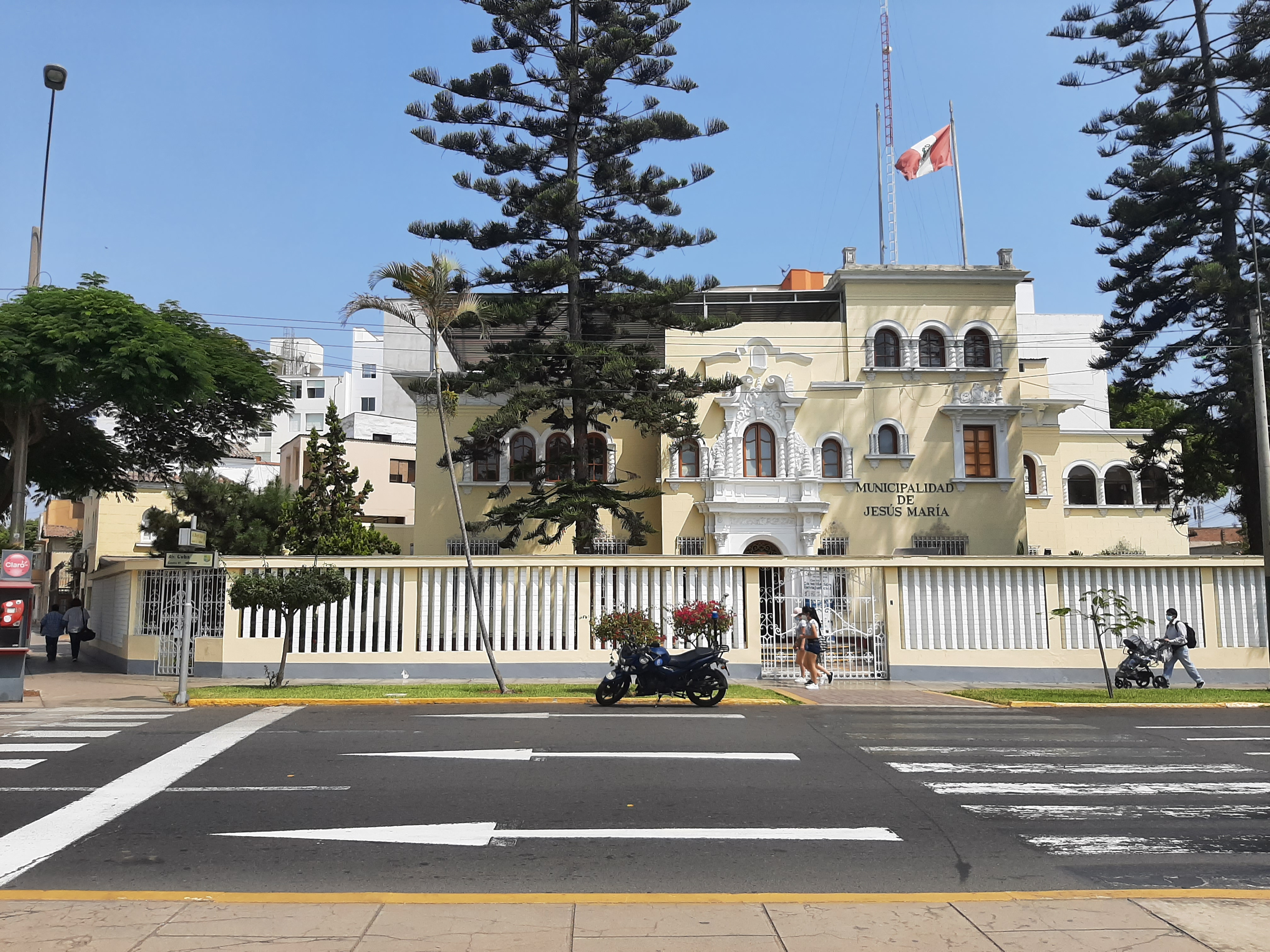
Jesús María's Town Hall in 2022.

Jesús María is under the jurisdiction of its own district municipality, as well as that of the Metropolitan Municipality of Lima.

=== List of mayors ===
Since 2023, the incumbent mayor is Jesús Galvez.

№	Mayor	Party	Term	
№	Mayor	Party	Begin	End
1	José Benavides Muñoz	AP–DC	1967	1969
2	Manuel Escalante Fortón	AP	1981	1983
3	Miguel Fort Magot	PPC	1984	1986
4	Miguel Oyanguren Agüero	PPC	1987	1989
4	Miguel Oyanguren Agüero	FREDEMO (PPC)	1990	1992
5	David Valenza Quiroga	Lima 2000	1993	1995
6	Francisca E. Izquierdo Negrón	SL	1995	1998
6	Francisca E. Izquierdo Negrón	PDSP	1998	2002
7	Carlos Alberto Bringas Claeyssen	PDSP	2003	2006
8	Luis Enrique Ocrospoma Pella	UN	2007	2010
8	Luis Enrique Ocrospoma Pella	PPC	2011	2014
9	Carlos Alberto Bringas Claeyssen	PSN	2015	2018
10	Jorge Luis Quintana García Godos	AP	2018	2022
11	Jesús Gálvez Olivares	RP	2023	Incumbent

=== Subdivisions ===
Jesús María is the site of a lone populated centre that is coterminous with the district:

Code	Name	Region Type	Altitude (MSL)	Population (total)	Housing (total)
0001	Jesús María	Chala	142	75,359 (2017)	28,743 (2017)

=== Twin cities ===
As of 2026, Jesús María is twinned with the following places:

- Antioquia, Peru
- Arica, Chile
- Capitán Meza, Paraguay
- Fichtelberg, Germany
- Guayaquil, Ecuador
- Jesús María, Argentina
- Santo Tomé, Argentina
- Porto Alegre, Brazil

== Geography ==
Jesús María is located 142 meters above sea level. It is part of Lima's Cono Centro, an unofficial subregion of the city.

=== Boundaries ===
Jesús María is bordered by the districts of Pueblo Libre and Breña to the west, downtown Lima to the north and east, Lince to the southeast, and San Isidro and Magdalena del Mar to the south.

=== Climate ===
Climate data for Lima
Month	Jan	Feb	Mar	Apr	May	Jun	Jul	Aug	Sep	Oct	Nov	Dec	Year
Record high °F	79	79	79	75	72	68	66	64	66	68	72	75	72
Record high °C	26	26	26	24	22	20	19	18	19	20	22	24	22
Average precipitation days	1	1	0	0	1	2	3	3	3	2	2	0	16
Average rainy days	4	2	3	2	5	11	12	15	13	7	5	3	82
Average relative humidity (%)	85	80	80	85	85	85	85	85	85	85	85	85	84.2
Mean monthly sunshine hours	179.1	169	139.2	184	116.4	50.6	28.6	32.3	37.3	65.3	89	139.2	1,284
Source: Weatherbase (Temperature, precipitation and humidity). and Universidad Complutense de Madrid (Sunlight)

== Demographics ==
Jesús María is an upper class, high-density district and it usually ranks in the top districts with the best quality of life in Peru with a Human Development Index (HDI) of 0.8372 (2019), lower only than the districts of La Molina and Lince.

=== Notable people ===
- Keiko Fujimori (born 1975), current President of Peru
- José Jerí (born 1986), 65th President of Peru

== Culture ==
Jesús María is home to several educational and cultural centres. Important avenues which demarcate the boundaries of the district are Brasil, 28 de Julio. Arenales, General Salaverry, and Faustino Sánchez Carrión (commonly referred to by its old name, Pershing). Main avenues within the district are San Felipe, Gregorio Escobedo, and Francisco Javier Mariàtegui.

=== Landmarks ===
Jesús María is home to a number of 20th-century houses, known as casonas, many of which were built in the Spanish Colonial Revival style.

Landmarks of Jesús María
Name	Location	Notes	Photo
Apostolic Nunciature	Salaverry 600	The building houses the permanent diplomatic mission of the Holy See to Peru.	
Campo de Marte		The park is one of the largest in the city. It contains a monument to the War of 1942 fought between Peru and Ecuador, a monument to a century of Japanese immigration, and the Eye that Cries, commemorating those killed and disappeared during Peru's internal conflict between 1980 and 1992. It is also home to the district's municipal sports complex.	
Japanese–Peruvian Cultural Centre	Residencial San Felipe	The building is operated by the Japanese Peruvian Association. It features a theatre, a museum dedicated to Japanese immigration, and a library, among other facilities.	
Edgardo Rebagliati Martins National Hospital	Rebagliati 490	The hospital is one of the largest and busiest health centers in the country.	
Embassy of Guatemala	Inca Ripac 309	The building houses the permanent diplomatic mission of Guatemala to Peru.	
Embassy of Italy	Garibaldi 298	The building houses the permanent diplomatic mission of Italy to Peru.	
Embassy of Japan	San Felipe 356	The building houses the permanent diplomatic mission of Japan to Peru.	
Embassy of Poland	Salaverry 1978	The building houses the permanent diplomatic mission of Poland to Peru.	
Latina Televisión	San Felipe 968	The building hosts the studios of one of the country's television channels.	
Ministry of Health	Salaverry 801	The building houses the ministry of the same name, as well as the city's medicinal botanical garden.	
Ministry of Labour	Salaverry 655	The building houses the ministry of the same name.	
Museum of Natural History	Arenales 1256	The museum is owned and operated by the National University of San Marcos. It was established in 1918 and houses important Peruvian fossils and the specimen collection of early Peruvian geographer and explorer, Antonio Raimondi.	
Niño Jesús de Praga Chapel	Cayetano Heredia 1164	The building functions as a chapel of the Society of Saint Pius X, offering Tridentine Mass services.	
Residencial San Felipe		The complex was built over a racetrack and commissioned by President Fernando Belaúnde and designed by a team headed in part by architects Enrique Ciriani, Jorge Páez, Jorge Bernuy, and Nikita Smirnoff Bracamonte, designed to combine a high residential density with ample green space, and shopping, banking, and schooling.	
San Antonio de Padua Church	San Felipe 571	Inaugurated on November 30, 1967. It is linked to the history of stained glass art in Lima's churches, a tradition championed by the Austrian artist Adolfo Winternitz. Its origins date back to May 2, 1952, with the creation of the parish, whose first priest was Urbano Cloutier. In the following years, he would found and build the school of the same name. The church was designed by Peruvian architect Roberto Wakeham and was inaugurated to commemorate the episcopal consecration of its then parish priest, Monsignor Lorenzo Guibord. It has a capacity of one thousand people and two entrances. Inside, it houses important works by Winternitz, as well as works by Italian sculptor Anna Maccagno.	
San José Church	San José Square	The church, with twin neo-Gothic spires, has been a landmark of the district since its inauguration by the Carmelite Order in 1949.	
San José Square		The park serves a de facto main square for the district, marks the district's original "downtown".	
Sérvulo Gutiérrez Cultural Centre	Horacio Urteaga 535	The complex serves as the district's municipal cultural centre. It is named after artist Sérvulo Gutiérrez, and hosts an art gallery and the district's municipal library.	

Other important medical centers within the district are the private Clínica San Felipe, and the hospitals of the National Police, the Army and the Air Force. The Universidad del Pacífico, one of the most prestigious universities in economy, is located at Salaverry avenue.

Several renowned research institutions also have their offices in Jesus Maria, including the Instituto de Estudios Peruanos (IEP) and the Centro Peruano de Estudios Sociales (CEPES). The Derrama Magisterial—the public school teachers' social security administration—and the Lima Chamber of Commerce are also included in the district. Jesus Maria is also host to the city's yearly international Book Fair.

== See also ==
- Administrative divisions of Peru
