= Teatro Peruano Japonés =

Theatre in Lima, Peru

Coordinates: 12°05′15″S 77°03′19″W

- Teatro Peruano Japonés
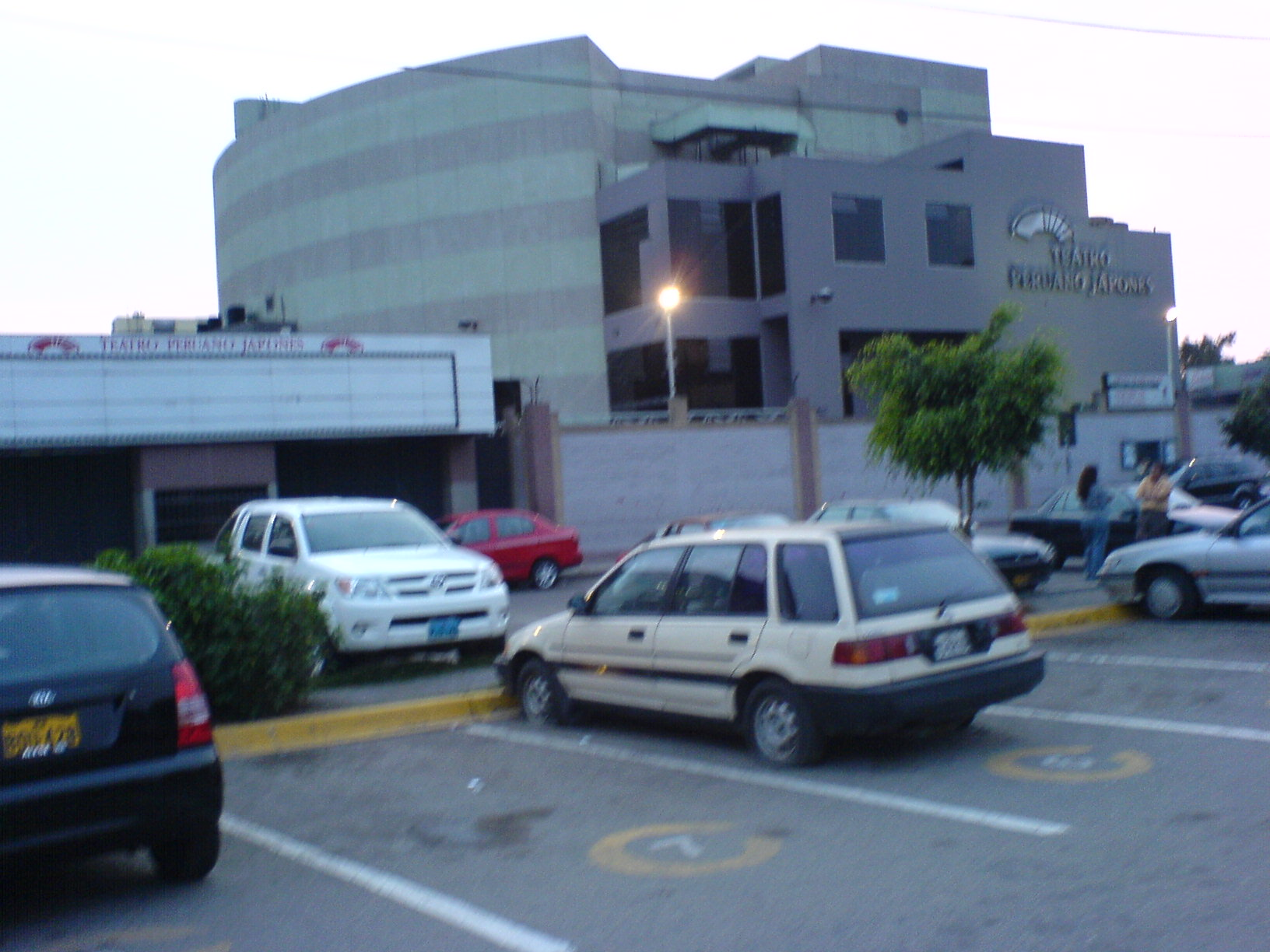
- 2008 photo of the theatre
- Interactive map of Teatro Peruano Japonés
- Address: Lima; Peru
- Type: Theatre

The Teatro Peruano Japonés is a theatre in Lima, Peru. It is located at the headquarters of Japanese Peruvian Association, a nonprofit organization for Peruvians of Japanese origin.
