= National Culture Award (Peru) =

- Native name: Premio Nacional de Cultura
- Sponsored by: Ministry of Culture; Petroperú
- Country: Peru
- First award: 1942
- Website: http://www.cultura.gob.pe/es/industrias-culturales-y-artes/premio-nacional-de-cultura

The National Culture Award (Premio Nacional de Cultura) is an honor presented annually (Note: There have been a number of discontinuities, notably from 1984 to 2012, and from 2019 to the present amid the country's ongoing political crisis.) by the Peruvian Ministry of Culture, with the support of Petroperú, to recognize individuals and organizations that contribute to the country's cultural development. Nominations are submitted by Peruvians in categories which have varied since the award's establishment.

== History ==
The award was created on 30 September 1942 by Law No. 9614 and was presented by the Ministry of Education in twelve categories; the winners were announced on 28 July.

In 1966, the award was expanded to 18 categories. On 20 March 1974, by Decree Law No. 20561, it was reduced to six categories (Literature, Art, Social Communication, Humanities, Natural Sciences and Mathematics, and Applied Sciences and Technology) and was presented by the National Institute of Culture.

The award was discontinued after 1983, but then reinstated in 2012 with three categories:

- Best Institutional Practices: recognition of a public or private entity, of national, regional or local scope, whose practice – in cultural management and promotion of art and culture, specifically – can serve as an example for other communities
- Career: recognition of the person whose work and contribution to Peruvian and universal culture, as a creator, researcher or preserver, has been sustainable and productive over time, in constant variation and pursuit
- Creativity: recognition of the most original and transcendent creator and/or researcher of Peruvian culture, who represents an innovative contribution to the panorama of their discipline and whose value can be recognized at the national level

In August 2019, the ministerial resolution governing the award was amended to remove the Creativity category, and to limit entries to the same fiscal year.

== Winners ==
=== 1942 ===
- Painting: Ignacio Merino
- History and Geography: Inca Garcilaso de la Vega
- Poetry: José Santos Chocano
- Novel: Ricardo Palma
- Law: Francisco García Calderón
- Music: Luis Duncker Lavalle
- Sculpture: Baltazar Gavilán
- Journalism: Antonio Miró Quesada
- Medicine: Hipólito Unanue
- Philosophy and Education: Manuel González Prada
- University Thesis: Javier Prado
- Scientific Research and Essay: Daniel Alcides Carrión

=== 1944 ===
- Poetry: Mario Florián Díaz

=== 1945 ===
- Poetry: Jorge Eduardo Eielson

=== 1946 ===
- Painting: Camilo Blas
- Poetry: Martín Adán
- Journalism: Jorge Puccinelli Converso

=== 1947 ===
- Painting: Juan Manuel Ugarte Eléspuru

=== 1950 ===
- Painting: Carlos Quíspez-Asín

=== 1952 ===
- Painting: Cota Carvallo
- Philosophy and Education: Jorge Puccinelli Converso

=== 1953 ===
- Law: Remigio Pino Carpio
- Music: Francisco Pulgar Vidal
- Poetry: Washington Delgado
- Painting: Alberto Dávila Zavala

=== 1954 ===
- Music: Francisco Pulgar Vidal

=== 1955 ===
- Poetry: Demetrio Quiroz Malca
- Journalism: Manuel Jesús Orbegozo

=== 1956 ===
- Scientific Research and Essay: Fernando Cabieses Molina
- Pedagogy: Luis Jaime Cisneros
- Poetry: Manuel Scorza

=== 1957 ===
- Novel: Mario Florián Díaz
- Children's Literature: Cota Carvallo

=== 1958 ===
- University Thesis: José María Arguedas

=== 1959 ===
- Poetry: Eleodoro Vargas Vicuña
- Painting: Teodoro Núñez Ureta
- Medicine: Javier Arias Stella
- Novel: Esteban Pavletich Trujillo

=== 1960 ===
- Novel: Julio Ramón Ribeyro
- Painting: Enrique Galdos Rivas

=== 1962 ===
- Poetry: Carlos Germán Belli
- Scientific Research and Essay: Martha Hildebrandt
- Novel: José María Arguedas

=== 1963 ===
- Pedagogy: Luis Jaime Cisneros
- Poetry: Arturo Corcuera
- Novel: Francisco Izquierdo Ríos

=== 1964 ===
- Poetry: Antonio Cisneros

=== 1965 ===
- Poetry: Cecilia Bustamante and Reynaldo Naranjo

=== 1966 ===
- Poetry: Francisco Bendezú Prieto

=== 1967 ===
- Novel: Mario Vargas Llosa
- Painting: Venancio Shinki
- Journalism: Augusto Tamayo Vargas

=== 1968 ===
- Novel: Marcos Yauri Montero
- Poetry: Alejandro Peralta Miranda
- History and Geography: José Antonio del Busto Duthurburu

=== 1969 ===
- Novel: Eduardo González Viaña
- Poetry: Marco Martos Carrera
- Scientific Research and Essay: Martha Hildebrandt

=== 1971 ===
- Poetry: Fernando Vidal and Juan Cristóbal González

=== 1972 ===
- Novel: Alfredo Bryce Echenique
- Children's Literature: Jorge Díaz Herrera

=== 1973 ===
- Novel: José Antonio Bravo

=== 1975 ===
- Literature: César Calvo
- Human Science: Jorge Basadre

=== 1976 ===
- Art: Joaquín López Antay

=== 1977 ===
- Literature: Luis Alberto Sánchez and
- Art: Emilio Adolfo Westphalen

=== 1980 ===
- Biological and Natural Sciences: Óscar Trelles Montes

=== 1983 ===
- Literature: Julio Ramón Ribeyro

=== 2012 ===
- Best Institutional Practices: "Sand and Mats" Association Workshop for Education and Communication through Art
- Creativity: Christian Bendayán
- Career: Gustavo Gutiérrez

=== 2013 ===
- Best Institutional Practices: Contisuyo Association
- Creativity: Edgardo Rivera Martínez
- Career: Rodolfo Hinostroza

=== 2014 ===
- Best Institutional Practices: La Tarumba
- Creativity: Lucho Quequezana
- Career: Francisco José Lombardi

=== 2015 ===
- Best Institutional Practices: National Registry of Identification and Civil Status
- Creativity: Gonzalo Portocarrero
- Career: Julio Cotler

=== 2016 ===
- Best Institutional Practices: Augusto N. Wiese Foundation
- Creativity: Ricardo Dolorier Urbano
- Career: Carlos Germán Belli

=== 2017 ===
- Best Institutional Practices: Lima Art Museum Association
- Creativity: Oscar Naters
- Career: Susana Baca

=== 2018 ===
- Best Institutional Practices: The Great March of the Puppets Cultural Center
- Creativity: Juan Cadillo
- Career: Humberto Rodríguez Pastor

=== 2019 ===
- Best Institutional Practices: Selvámonos Association
- Career: Miguel Rubio Zapata
