= San Felipe Municipality =

San Felipe Municipality may refer to:

- San Felipe Municipality, Baja California, Mexico
- San Felipe Municipality, Yaracuy, Venezuela
- San Felipe Municipality, Yucatán, Mexico
