= Alicia Alva Mantari =

Peruvian mathematician and epidemiologist

Alicia Katherine Alva Mantari
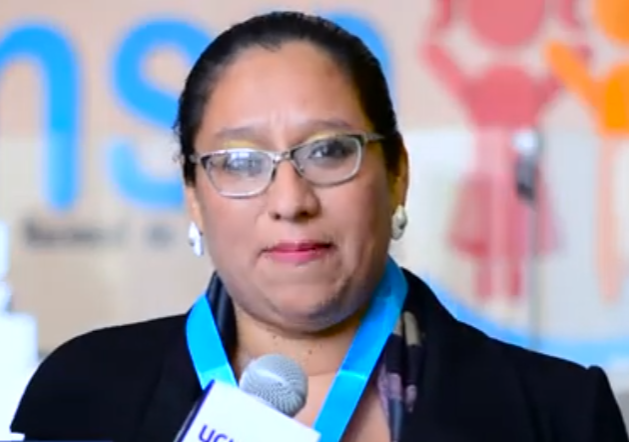
- Born: 1977 (age 48–49); Peru
- Education: National University of Engineering
- Scientific career
- Institutions: Cayetano Heredia University

Alicia Katherine Alva Mantari (born 1977, Lima) is a Peruvian specialist in biomedical informatics and telemedicine. She holds a master's degree with focus on global health and has been actively involved in telemedicine projects since 2008, leading tele-diagnosis systems projects for diseases such as tuberculosis and melanoma.

For ten years, she was a member of the Bioinformatics and Molecular Biology Laboratory at Cayetano Heredia University (Universidad Peruana Cayetano Heredia; UPCH) .

Alva has been involved in national research projects focused on health technology, including initiatives to combat COVID-19 and studies on heavy metal contamination. Her contributions have supported the growth of telemedicine in Peru, improving access to healthcare for those in hard-to-reach regions.

== Biography ==
=== Early years and education ===
Alicia Alva studied in Alcides Spelucín Vega School in Callao, where she participated in mathematics competitions and developed an interest in science. Later on, she studied mathematics at the National University of Engineering (Universidad Nacional de Ingeniería; UNI), where she developed analytical and computational thinking.

During her master's studies, she participated on a project to develop an algorithm for tuberculosis detection. Her programming studies led her to be a member of the molecular biology laboratory at UPCH.

She earned a master's degree in biomedical informatics at UPCH, in collaboration with the University of Washington through a QUIPU program scholarship.

=== Career ===
As a researcher at the University of Sciences and Humanities, she was one of the winners of CONCYTEC funding in 2020 with her project SAMAYCOV, a portable device designed to assess the risk of pneumonia in patients suspected of having COVID-19 by detecting sounds. It converts these sounds into electrical signals, which are then processed by a Python-based program.

In 2022, Alva developed Soft-Warmi, an automated software for diagnosing bacterial vaginosis (BV). This research was part of her master's thesis at UPCH, in collaboration with the University of Washington. The main objective of the project was to improve the accuracy and accessibility of BV diagnosis using pattern recognition algorithms to analyze microscopic images of vaginal smears.

In 2024, she participated in the creation of Yanadevn, an early dengue diagnostic system developed by researchers at the University of Sciences and Humanities in collaboration with UPCH and regional hospitals. The device uses CRISPR/Cas13 technology to detect the presence of dengue RNA in blood.

== Research and publications ==
She co-authored the study "Implementation of a telediagnostic system for tuberculosis and determination of multi-drug resistance based on the MODS method in Trujillo, Peru". It focused on developing a remote diagnostic system for tuberculosis and multidrug resistance (MDR) using the MODS method. It optimized an image recognition algorithm to detect Mycobacterium tuberculosis in digital MODS culture images from the CENEX-Trujillo laboratory.

She also participated in the development of Mathematical algorithms for the automatic recognition of intestinal parasites, which was a tool for detecting intestinal parasites in microscopic images of fecal smears. The study implemented an image processing algorithm in SCILAB, capable of identifying Taenia sp., Trichuris trichiura, Diphyllobothrium latum, and Fasciola hepatica.

== Awards and recognitions ==
- She won the "Special Projects: COVID-19 Response" 2020 competition by Concytec for the SAMAYCOV project, a device designed to assess COVID-19 risk related to lung damage.
- She won the II National Innotec Competition 2010, for the development of a tele-diagnosis system for multidrug-resistant tuberculosis (TB-MDR), capable of providing results in less than 15 seconds.
