= Dionicia Gamboa =

Peruvian parasitologist

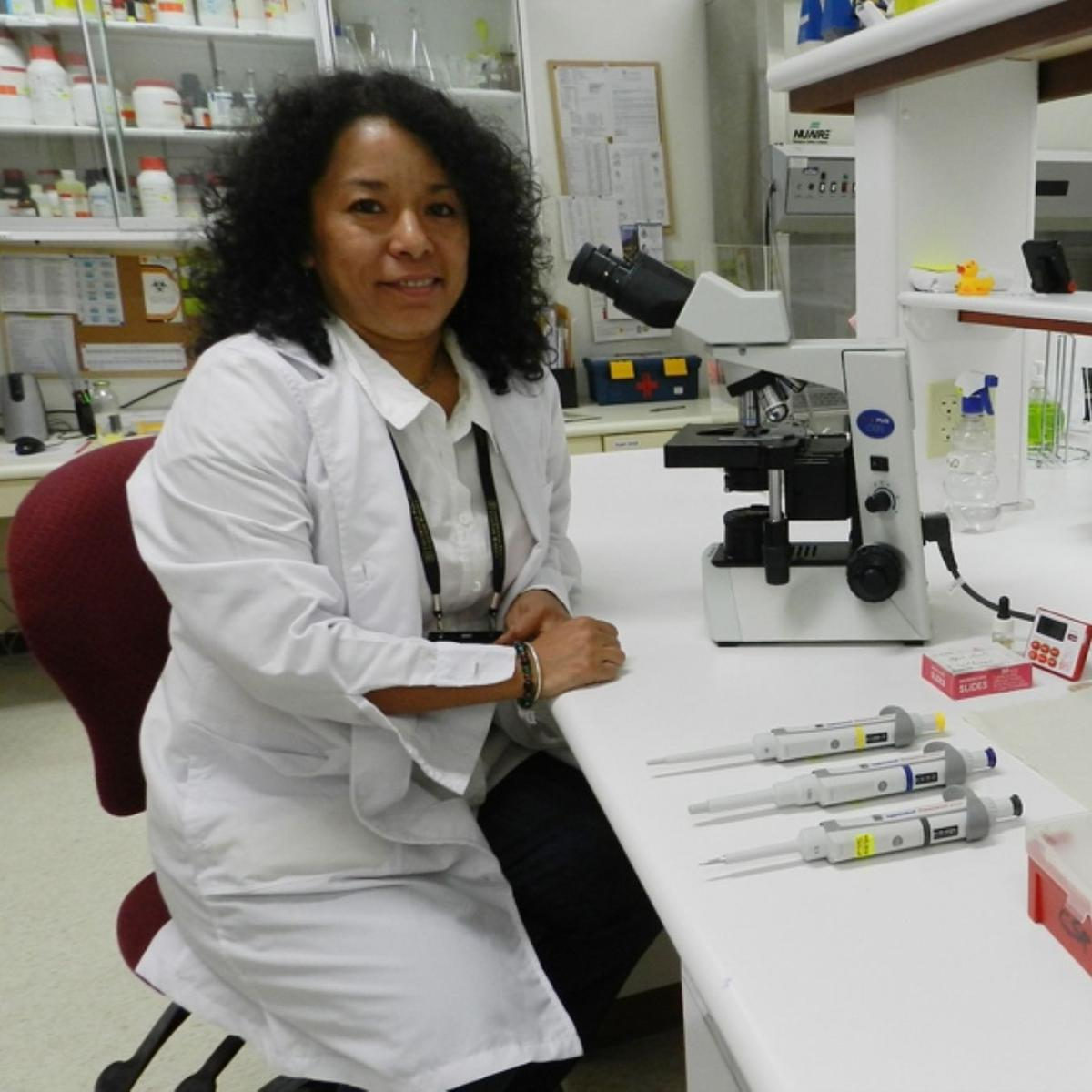
Image of Dionicia Gamboa

Dionicia Gamboa is a Peruvian parasitologist and professor at Institute of Tropical Medicine Alexander von Humboldt, Cayetano Heredia University. Her research focusses on Plasmodium vivax, a major malaria parasite species in South America (as well as South-East Asia).

== Early life and education ==
Gamboa grew up in Chiclayo. She studied at I.E. Nuestra Señora del Rosario School. When Gamboa finished school, she moved to Lima to pursue university studies. While studying to apply for university, Gamboa found her true passion for research, and eventually did her bachelor's degree in biology and master's degree in biochemistry at Cayetano Heredia University. Few years later, Gamboa moved to The Netherlands for her PhD on Leishmania at Maastricht University.

== Research ==
She built up the malaria group at the Institute of Tropical Medicine to a team of around 50 people conducting lab-based studies locally in Lima and field-work around Iquitos.

Gamboa and her group work with Special Programme for Research and Training in Tropical Diseases, WHO, and the Peruvian Ministry of Health, to track mosquito breeding and malaria transmission in the Amazon. 96% of the malaria burden for Peru is found in the rainforest-laden Department of Loreto, where the most abundant vector is Anopheles darlingi mosquitoes. Her research team used aerial drones to construct maps of where large bodies of stagnant water can be found across the rural region, which provide fertile habitats for developing mosquitoes.

Gamboa is a project lead at the Amazonian Center of Excellence in Malaria Research established by the NIH and led by Joseph Vinetz.

== Awards and honors ==
- Gamboa was awarded an Elsevier Foundation Award in 2013 for her work as a young woman scientist on her continent. However she recently commented on the disappointment that her country was no longer entitled to discounted access to the Elsevier journals due to recent economic growth.
- In 2016 Gamboa was given the L'Oréal-UNESCO For Women in Science Awards by L'Oréal Peru, UNESCO and The National Council for Science, Technology and Technological Innovation (Consejo Nacional de Ciencia, Tecnología e Innovación Tecnológica), worth 45,000 Peruvian sols.
- In 2021, the National Council for Science, Technology and Innovation of Peru recognized her contributions by including her in the book titled Women Scientists of Peru: 24 Stories to Discover.
- In 2025, she became the first Peruvian woman to be inducted into The World Academy of Sciences (TWAS).
