= Javier Mariátegui =

Peruvian psychiatrist

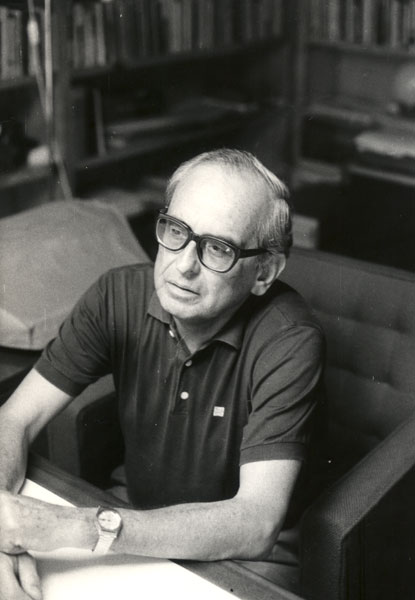
- Javier Mariátegui photographed by Servais Thissen
- Born: Javier Mariátegui Chiappe; 13 September 1928; Lima, Peru
- Died: 3 August 2008 (aged 79); Lima, Peru
- Education: Universidad Nacional Mayor de San Marcos, M.D. Universidad Peruana Cayetano Heredia, Ph.D.
- Scientific career
- Fields: Psychiatry; Social psychiatry Psychopharmacology
- Workplaces: Universidad Peruana Cayetano Heredia
- Academic advisors: Honorio Delgado
- Notable students: Juan Mezzich Renato D. Alarcón

Javier Mariátegui Chiappe (13 September 1928 in Lima – 3 August 2008 in Lima) was a renowned Peruvian intellectual and psychiatrist. He was the last of the children of José Carlos Mariátegui and Anna Chiappe. Studied at the University of San Marcos where he also started teaching; he was also a founder of Cayetano Heredia University. He was also the founding director of the National Institute of Mental Health “Honorio Delgado - Hideyo Noguchi”. He died in Lima.

== Early life ==
He was born on 13 September 1928 in Lima, Peru to José Carlos Mariátegui La Chira and Anna Chiappe Iacomini, an Italian woman. His older brother was Sandro Mariátegui Chiappe.

== First years ==
In 1947 he entered the University of San Marcos, studying in parallel pre-medicine and humanities, in 1949 he decided to follow studies in the Medicine Faculty of San Fernando. It was exactly with his companion of bench at the School San Luis, the Father Gustavo Gutiérrez, that took in parallel sciences and humanities, enjoying philosophy classes, as those of Mariano Iberico and also they studied the first year of medicine; both being also college students representatives. In 1956 he was received as M.D. with the thesis "Psychopathology of the experimental poisoning with dietilamida of acid d-lisérgico (LSD)" and he distinguished with the contenta for having obtained the highest grade during his studies, nevertheless he decided to stay in Peru.

== Academic and professional life ==
In 1957 it was gotten up to teaching and she was head of clinic in the chair of Psychiatry that directed Honorio Delgado and like delegate of the professors of that category, integrated in 1960 the faculty board. In 1961 he participated in the movement of professors that determined the foundation of Cayetano Heredia University. Starting as TA, he was then incorporated to the department of Psychiatry as reader, in 1971 was promoted to the category of university professor. In 1972 he obtained the Degree of Medicine Doctor in the Peruvian University Cayetano Heredia, with the thesis: "Socio-psiquiatría en el Perú. Algunos aspectos de investigación". His hospital work began in 1957 in the Víctor Larco Herrera Hospital and since 1962 directed the Service of Mental Health "Honorio Delgado" of the Ministry of Public Health. He was Founder and Director of the National Institute of Mental Health “Honorio Delgado - Hideyo Noguchi” (1980 - 1987). In 1963 he published his first book "Studies of Social Psychiatry in Peru" with Baltazar Caravedo, Humberto Rotondo and in 1969 "Psychiatric Epidemiology of an Urban District of Lima" with Berna Alva and Ovidio de Leon.

His intellectual work in the field of psychiatry and humanities made him a Member of the National Medicine Academy (1987) and of Peruvian Academy of the Language (1993). In 1994 he became Professor Emeritus of the Medicine Faculty of the University of San Marcos and in 1999 of the Peruvian University Cayetano Heredia.

== Disciple of Honorio Delgado ==
Javier Mariátegui always emphasized by his intellectual loyalty and great admiration by people who marked their academic formation, much of the representative figures of Peruvian medicine as well as by some of his university teachers. He wrote periodically and published books in tribute of illustrious intellectuals and Peruvian physicians, some that considered important to rescue as well as others with which it maintained a personal communication. Such as the book Hermilio Valdizán. The project of a Peruvian psychiatry (Lima, 1981) and recently Juan Francisco Valega and Lima of His Time (Lima, 2001). From 1969 he was Director-Publisher of the Journal of Neuropsychiatry, founded by Honorio Delgado and Julio Oscar Trelles in 1938 which is published regularly to date. In 1989 he directed the edition of Psychiatry in Latin America (published by Losada, Buenos Aires), one of the first compilations on the psychiatric reality of Latin America. Also he was member of the Publishing Board of Acta Psychiatrica Scandinavica and Editor of Acta Herediana, publication of the UPCH, among many others. In the professional field he was member of numerous organizations and committees between which honored the Committee of Experts in Mental Health of World Health Organization. He was author of several books and more than one hundred scientific works and a similar number of tests and journalistic articles. His professional interests were focused on clinical psychiatry, clinical psychopathology, psychopharmacology, social psychiatry, history of psychiatry and mental health policy.

== Son of José Carlos Mariátegui ==
The admiration towards his father, José Carlos Mariátegui, encouraged him to dedicate his life –since very young– to the publication of Mariátegui's complete works and the spreading of his ideas. Since 1988 he began systematically to produce essays about his father. In 1989 he participated as co-editor –with his brother José Carlos–, of the Anuario Mariáteguiano, a periodic publication dedicated to the works of José Carlos Mariátegui. In 1994 he participated in the organization of the activities of the centenary of Mariategui. In 2005 he became Honorary Director of the Memorial Museum José Carlos Mariátegui of the National Institute of Culture. He has published more than 30 articles in relation to Mariátegui, most of them compiled in a book.

== Publications ==
- Estudios de Psiquiatría Social en el Perú (with B. Caravedo, H. Rotondo y col.), Ediciones del Sol, Lima, 400 pp. 1963.
- Epidemiología Psiquiátrica de un Distrito Urbano de Lima (with V. Alva y 0. De León), Ediciones de la Revista de Neuro-Psiquiatría, Lima, 115 pp. 1969.
- Estudios de Epidemiología Psiquiátrica en América Latina (edited with Gonzalo Adis Castro), Monografía 2 de Acta Psiquiátrica y Psicológica de América Latina, Buenos Aires, June 1970.
- Sociopsiquiatría en el Perú. Algunos aspectos de investigación. PhD Thesis, Universidad Peruana Cayetano Heredia, Lima, 71 pp. 1972.
- Hermilio Valdizán. El proyecto de una psiquiatría peruana, Editorial Minerva Miraflores, Lima, 161 pp. 1981.
- Salud Mental y Realidad Nacional. El primer quinquenio del Instituto Nacional de Salud Mental, Editorial Minerva Miraflores, Lima, 275 pp. 1988.
- La Psiquiatría en América Latina (Ed. J. Mariátegui), Editorial Losada, Buenos Aires, 230 pp. 1989.
- Freud y el Psicoanálisis. Escritos y Testimonio de Honorio Delgado (Introducción, compilación y notas de Javier Mariategui), Fondo Editorial de la Universidad Peruana Cayetano Heredia, Industrial gráfica, Lima, 572 pp., 1989.
- Paleopsiquiatría del Antiguo Perú de Hermilio Valdizán (Introducción, compilación y notas de Javier Mariátegui), Fondo Editorial de la UPCH, Industrialgráfica, Lima, 226 pp. 1990.
- El Médico, la Medicina y el Alma de Honorio Delgado (Compilación y postfacio de Javier Mariátegui), Fondo Editorial de UPCH, Industrialgráfica, Lima, 180 pp., 1992.
- Elogio de Honorio Delgado y otras notas sobre su Centenario (Publicación de la Cátedra Honorio Delgado, UPCH), pp 64. Editorial Minerva Miraflores, pp, 1993.
- Ecología, tiempo anímico y existencia de Honorio Delgado (Compilación y prefacio de Javier Mariátegui), Fondo Editorial de UPCH, Industrialgráfica, Lima, 180 pp., 1993.
- El Mercurio Peruano y la Medicina, Fondo Editorial de la Universidad Peruana Cayetano Heredia, Editorial Minerva-Miraflores, Lima, 146 pp., 1994.
- La Medicina como Arte Literario en el Perú, Edición personal, Editorial Minerva-Miraflores, 62 pp., 1994.
- Juan Francisco Valega y la Lima de su Tiempo, Fondo Editorial del Congreso de la República, 202 pp., 2001.
- José Carlos Mariátegui: Formación, Contexto e Influencia de un Pensamiento, Universidad Ricardo Palma - Editorial Universitaria y Casa Museo José Carlos Mariátegui, 223 pp., 2012.
