= Ramiro Castro de la Mata =

Ramiro Castro de la Mata (full name Ramiro Castro de la Mata y Caamaño) (Huanuco, Peru, September 5, 1931 - Lima, Peru, December 27, 2006) was a physician, scientist, pharmacologist, professor and founder of the University Cayetano Heredia in Lima, Peru. He was recognized internationally as an expert in drug addiction.

== Academic achievements ==
Castro de la Mata earned his medical doctor degree at the Cayetano Heredia University in 1958. Early in his career he was an adjunct professor of pharmacology at the National University of San Marcos (1958–1960). He was a Ricker Research Fellow, at the University of Pennsylvania, Philadelphia (1960–1961). His long academic career at the Cayetano Heredia University included the position of academic vice-president from 1984 to 1989. He was a founding member and president of the National Pharmacological Society (Sociedad Peruana de Farmacología y Terapéutica Experimental), and a member of the National Academy of Sciences (Sociedad Peruana de Ciencias).

In 1986 he was one of the founders and first president of the Centro de Información y Educación para la Prevención del Abuso de Drogas (CEDRO).

== Awards and distinctions ==
In recognition of his important contributions to science and education in Peru, Castro de la Mata was incorporated as a member of three National Academies in Peru: Medicine, Science, and History. Among his awards and distinctions are the 1996 National Prize for Scientific Innovation, and the National Medal and Diploma for Extraordinary Services from the Colegio Medico del Peru.

The VI National Pharmacology Congress of Peru celebrated in September 2016 was named in his honor "Ramiro Castro de la Mata Caamaño."

== Live recordings of his academic activities ==
In 1994 he interviewed live in his own home Dr. Duccio Bonavia, one of the foremost Peruvian archaeologists.

== Personal life ==
Castro de la Mata was married to Elsa Valdivia Vargas and had three children: Mariana, Gonzalo and Alonso.

== Selected publications ==
- Castro de la Mata, R. 2003. Inventario de la Coca
- Castro de la Mata, R., and A. Zavaleta. 2005. Epidemiología de drogas en la población urbana peruana
- Castro de la Mata. R. 2005. Consumo de Drogas en el Peru. Debate Agrario.
- Castro de la Mata, R. Drogas en el Peru. 2005.
- Castro de la Mata, 1995. R. Coca : erythroxylum coca : erythroxylum novogranatense: bibliografía comentada.
