= Patricia Sheen =

Peruvian biologist

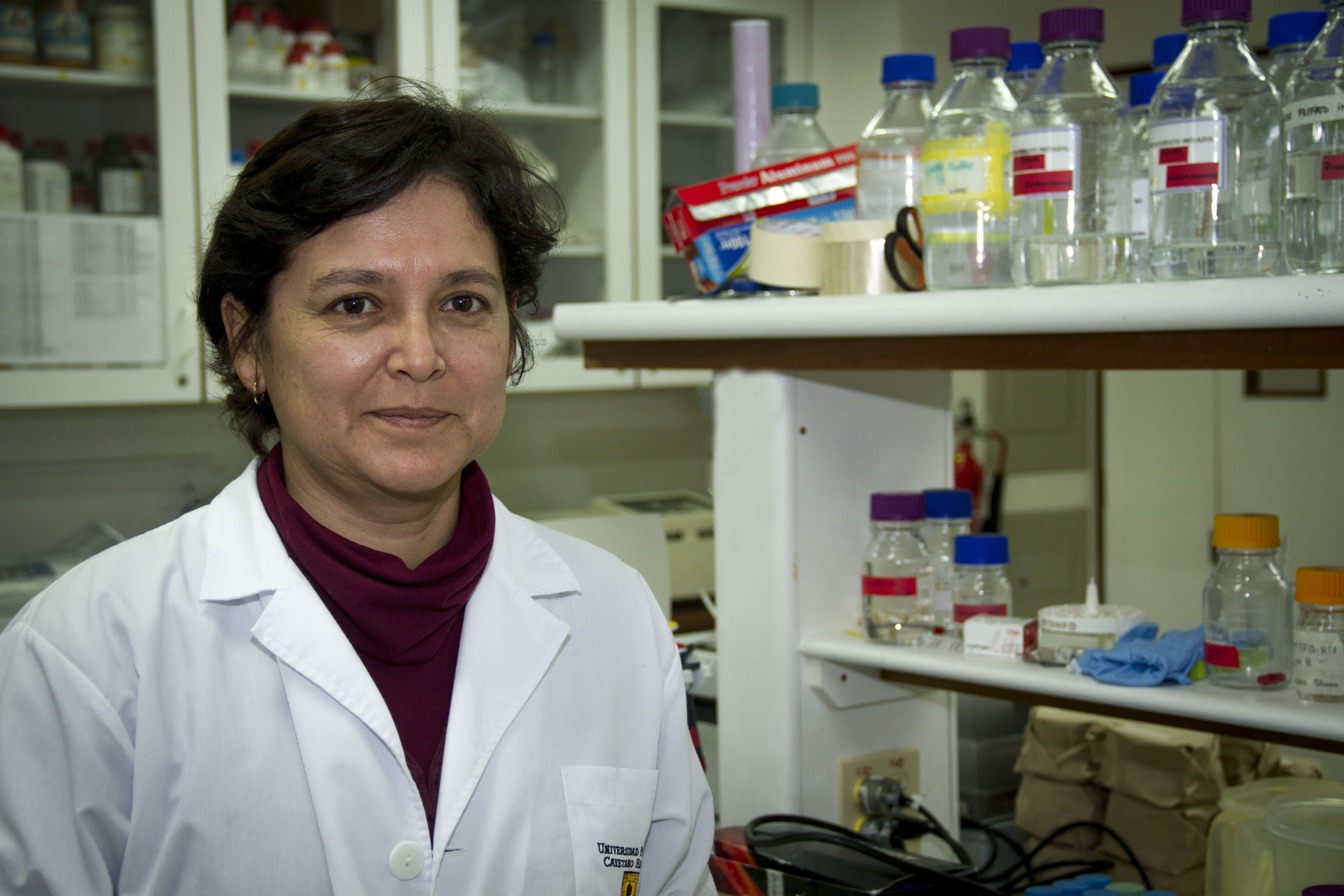
- Born: 1971 (age 54–55); Huanuco
- Education: Ricardo Palma University
- Scientific career
- Fields: microbiology and infectious diseases
- Workplaces: Cayetano Heredia University, Jhons Hopkins University

Patricia Sheen Cortavarria (Huanuco, 1971) is a Peruvian biologist, a Peruvian biologist who serves as the coordinator of the Infectious Diseases Research Laboratory and co-leader of the Molecular Biology and Bioinformatics Laboratory at the Cayetano Heredia University. She has been recognized with the title of "Distinguished Researcher" by the National Council of Science, Technology, and Innovation (CONCYTEC) of Peru for her contributions to the scientific field.

Her research primarily focuses on the genetic study of bacteria responsible for tuberculosis, with a particular emphasis on the mechanisms of resistance to pyrazinamide in Mycobacterium tuberculosis. Sheen Cortavarría is also engaged in the development and enhancement of diagnostic methods for tuberculosis and multidrug-resistant tuberculosis. In 2014, she was awarded the National L'Oréal-Unesco-Concytec Prize.

== Early life and education ==
Patricia Sheen Cortavarría was born in Huánuco, Peru. From an early age, she demonstrated a profound interest in the study of living organisms, with particular fascination for those examined through the lens of microbiology.

She studied Biology at Ricardo Palma University, where she completed her undergraduate thesis titled Identification of Lactobacillus casei sp. strain GG in feces using immunological assays. Building on this foundation, she pursued a Master's degree in Biochemistry at the Universidad Peruana Cayetano Heredia. Subsequently, she earned a Doctorate in Disease Control from Johns Hopkins University in 2008.

== Career ==
Sheen began her scientific career as a research associate in the Microbiology Division of the Prisma Non-Profit Association. A few years later, she undertook residencies at two prominent research institutions. The first was at Johns Hopkins University, where she specialized in genetic techniques (RFLP, SSCP) for the diagnosis of tuberculosis and in the study of genes associated with isoniazid resistance. Subsequently, she joined the Naval Medical Research Unit Detachment (NAMRID) of the United States Navy, where she focused on microbiological diagnostic techniques and research involving Campylobacter jejuni.

In 1996, Sheen joined the Tuberculosis Division of the Department of Pathology at the Cayetano Heredia University as a research associate, and in 2001, she assumed the role of Coordinator of the Infectious Diseases Research Laboratory within the Research and Development Laboratories, while also taking on teaching responsibilities at the same institution.

She has led multiple research projects funded by the Peruvian government through CONCYTEC, as well as by international organizations. These include: the diagnosis of pulmonary and pleural tuberculosis via PCR in stool and pleural fluid samples; development of software for the diagnosis of intestinal parasites; implementation of an expert web-based system to support the diagnosis of infectious diseases; and evaluation of pyrazinamide resistance in Mycobacterium tuberculosis.

== Scientific research ==
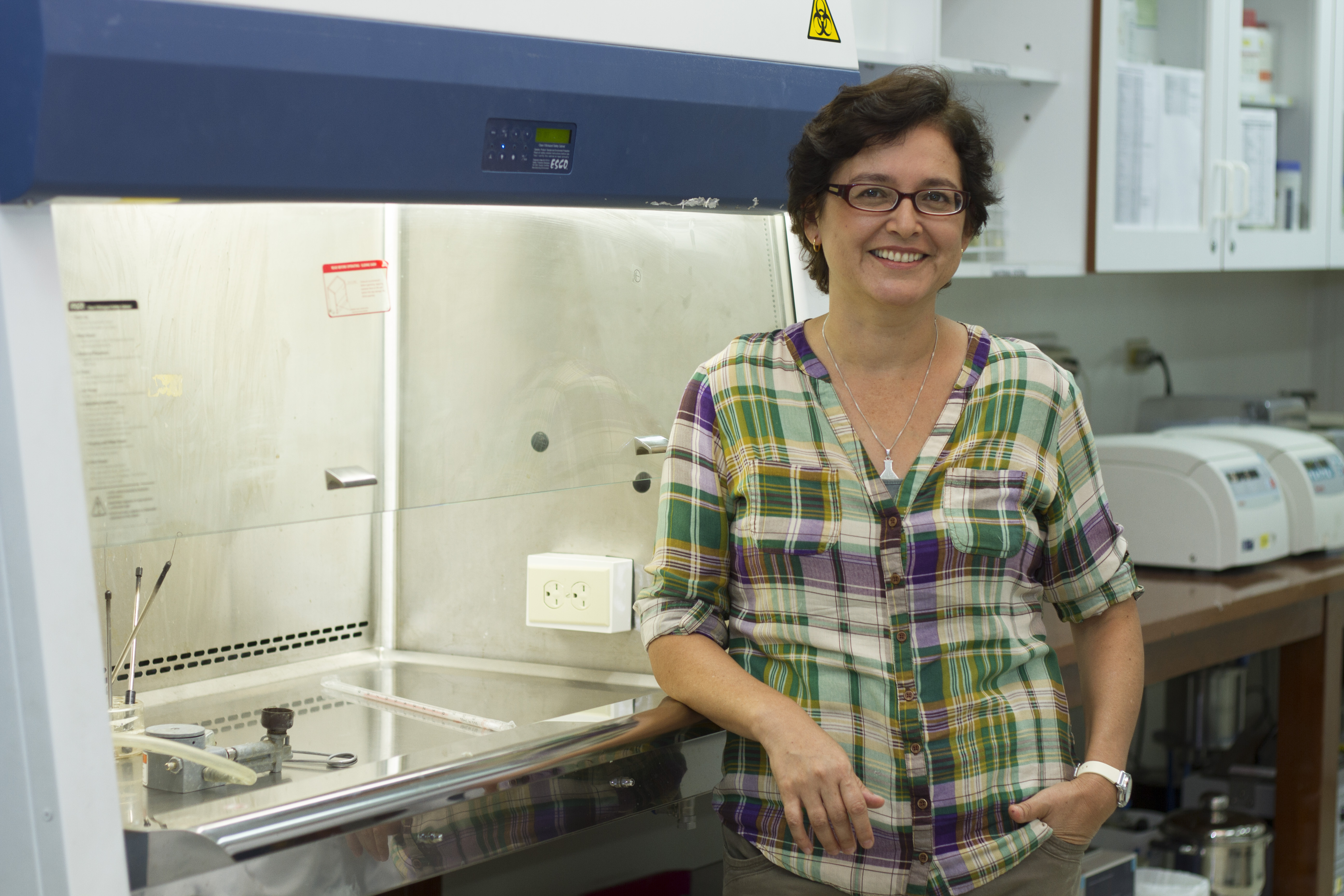
Dr. Patricia Sheen Cortavarría in her laboratory located at the Universidad Peruana Cayetano Heredia

Patricia Sheen has more than 70 scientific articles., 64 of them in the Scopus repository. Some of the most relevant are:

In 1995, she published a short report in The American Journal of Tropical Medicine and Hygiene with the name "A Placebo-Controlled Study of Lactobacillus GG Colonization in One-to-Three-Year-Old Peruvian Children". In 1998, her first scientific article about Mycobacterium tuberculosis was about its detection in nasopharyngeal aspirate samples in children.

In 2013, she published findings on the genetic diversity of Mycobacterium tuberculosis strains present in Peru and their relationship with drug resistance. They also reported factors associated with resistance to pyrazinamide in M. tuberculosis, focusing on the expression of the pncA gene, pyrazinamidase enzyme activity, and the expulsion of pyrazinoic acid. Later, in 2017, they presented a comprehensive genomic analysis of 68 M. tuberculosis strains isolated from patients in Peru, identifying mutations and genes linked to resistance to pyrazinamide, a key drug in tuberculosis treatment.

In 2019, Sheen proposed an automated system for tuberculosis diagnosis using digital image analysis based on the Drug Susceptibility Testing by Microscopic Observation method, known as MODS. In 2022, she published results on the evaluation of alternative growth medium designed to reduce the cost of MODS-based tuberculosis diagnosis. That same year, she introduced a device for the automatic decontamination, purification, and concentration of sputum samples, aimed at lowering the costs of diagnosing tuberculosis and multidrug-resistant tuberculosis. The invention received a Gold Medal at the "Korea International Women's Invention Exposition – KIWIE 2023" and a special commendation from Dongguk University.

In 2023, she proposed a nuclear magnetic resonance method to determine pyrazinamide susceptibility directly in the supernatant of sputum cultures collected from tuberculosis patients. Comparative analyses against other biochemical and molecular assays suggest that the newly developed method could become the next "gold standard" for determining susceptibility to this drug.

== Awards and recognitions ==
Patricia Sheen received the National L'Oréal-Unesco-Concytec Award for Women in Science 2014 presenting the "Determination of Pyrazinamide Resistance Using Quantitative Wayne Method in Mycobacterium tuberculosis (TB) Strains.

In 2021, her life and research story has appeared and also other female scientist stories in the Concytec book titled Scientists of Peru: 24 stories to discover (Científicas del Perú: 24 historias por descubrir, in Spanish).

In 2023, Sheen obtained a gold medal and a special recognition with PhD Mirko Zimic, for their invention "Automatic equipment for the decontamination, purification and concentration of sputum for a cost-effective diagnosis of tuberculosis and multidrug resistance" in the 16th International Exhibition of Women's Inventions in South Korea, "KIWIE" 2023, took place in Seoul from July 20 to 22.
