= Gustavo Zubieta-Castillo =

Bolivian physician (1926-2015)

Gustavo Zubieta-Castillo (May 20, 1926 – September 17, 2015) was a Bolivian physician, high altitude medicine expert, physiologist, army surgeon, writer, painter, who was named as the "Mountain Guru" at the St. John's Medical College in Bangalore, India.

He worked on high altitude physiology. He was born at 3800 mts in Oruro, Bolivia, and then studied medicine at the Universidad Mayor de San Andres in the city of La Paz, at 3513 mt above sea level, all his work was focused on initially high altitude physiology and later evolved to high altitude pathology. He proposed new concepts and understanding of what was known as Chronic mountain sickness. This pathology characterized by an increase of red blood cells, cyanosis, ventilatory and respiratory alterations with pulmonary hypertension and hypertrophy of the right ventricle seen at high altitude, above the normal values for such altitude, was originally affirmed to be due to "loss of adaptation". He changed this interpretation, as he strongly stood for “The organic systems of human beings and all other species tend to adapt to any environmental change and circumstance within an optimal period of time, and never tend towards regression which would inevitably lead to death”. This concept has indeed changed the way high altitude diseases are interpreted.

On July 9, 1970, Zubieta-Castillo founded the first high altitude clinic in the world located in La Paz, Bolivia High Altitude Pathology Institute. One of his theories was the proposal that man has the extraordinary capability to adapt to live in the hypoxic environment of the highest point on the planet Earth: the summit of Mount Everest.
