= Mountain sickness =

Mountain sickness can refer to:

- Altitude sickness or acute mountain sickness, a pathological condition that is caused by acute exposure to low air pressure
- Chronic mountain sickness, a disease that can develop during extended time living at altitude
