= Fabiola León-Velarde =

Peruvian physiologist

Fabiola León Velarde Servetto
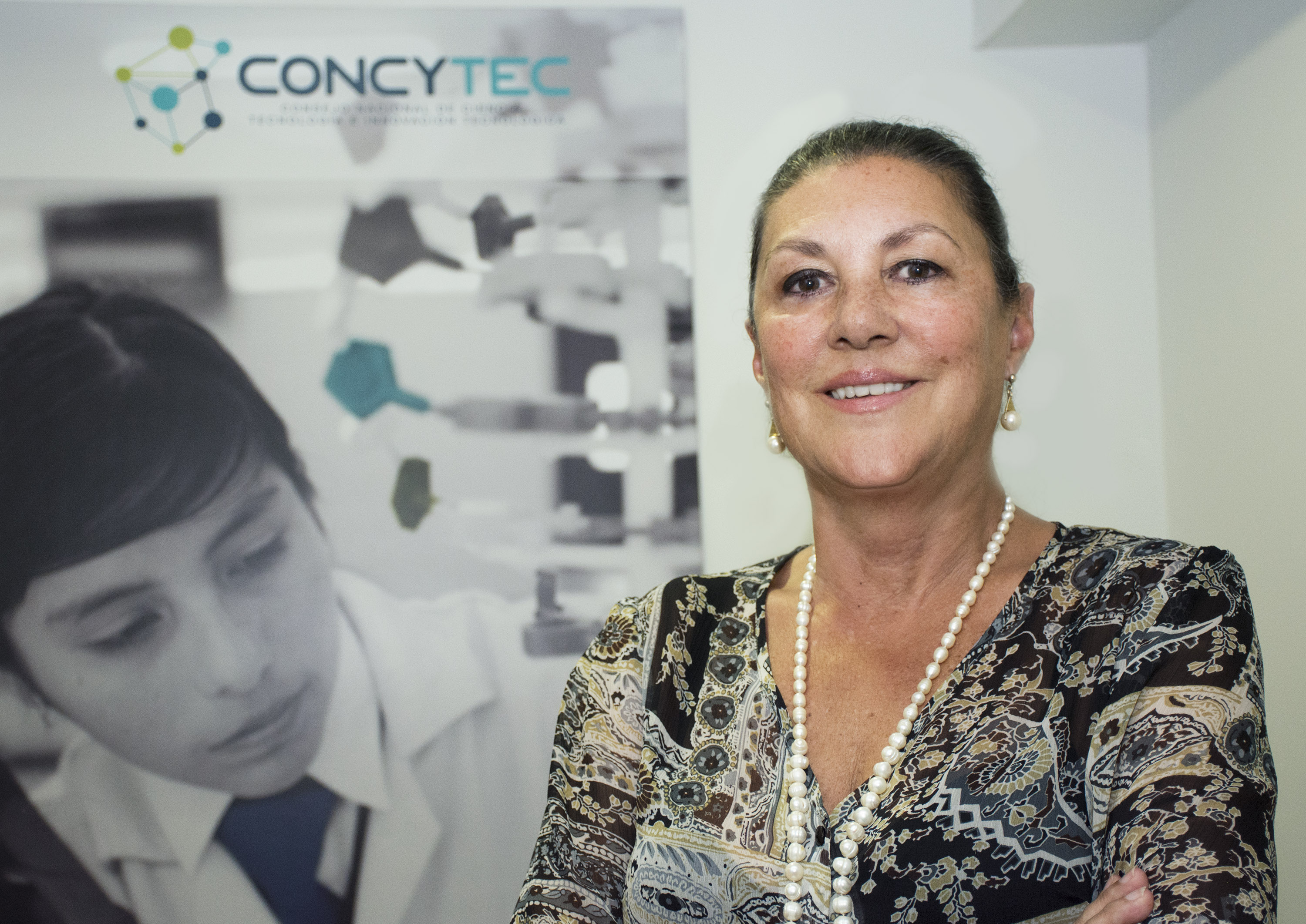
- Born: June 18, 1956 (age 70)
- Spouse: Gino Costa Santolalla
- Scientific career
- Fields: High altitude biology and physiology
- Workplaces: Universidad Peruana Cayetano Heredia

Fabiola León-Velarde Servetto (Lima, June 18, 1956) is a Peruvian physiologist who has devoted her research to the biology and physiology of high altitude adaptation. Born in Lima, Peru. She is the daughter of Carlos Leon-Velarde Gamarra and Juana Servetto Marti from Uruguay, and granddaughter of Angelica Gamarra. Under the mentorship of high altitude physiologist Carlos Monge Cassinelli, she obtained a BSc. in Biology (1979), an MSc (1981) and DSc (1986) in physiology at Cayetano Heredia University in Lima, Perú.

She was Rector of the Cayetano Heredia University (UPCH). She was previously Vice-President for Research of UPCH and Chairwoman of the Department of Biological and Physiological Sciences at the same university. She has also been Vice-President of the International Society for Mountain Medicine and, during nine years has been doing collaborative research with the Human Respiratory Section of the Laboratory of Physiology of the University of Oxford in the United Kingdom, where she has been invited as "Fellow" of the "Queen's College". At the moment, she is also Associated Investigator of ARPE/UFR of Medicine of the University of Paris XIII in France.

She has been a consultant in diverse national and international institutions, including the International Center of Research for Development (CIID) of Canada, on the health problems in the Andean Region and of the International Labour Organization (OIT). In the last years she has participated as a Consultant in the Antamina Mining Project and at the Andean Organism of Health. At the present time, she is Review Committee member of the National Council of Science and Technology [CONCYTEC], the National Agency for Scientific and Technological Promotion (SECYT-FONCYT), the International Foundation for Science (IFS) and member of the Board of Directors of the National Superintendence of Higher University Education (SUNEDU).

Leon-Velarde has a vast scientific production that has been published in more than 80 abstracts and more than 100 peer-reviewed articles in international scientific journals. She is also author of chapters in several books about altitude sickness and related topics particularly in the Andes. She is a member of important scientific societies such as The American Physiological Society and the Academy of Sciences of Latin America.

Leon-Velarde is a founding member of the judging panel of PODER's Think Tank of the Year Awards that aim to celebrate the good work done by think tanks in the country.

Leon-Velarde is the mother of one son, Gianpiero Leoncini Leon-Velarde.

== See also ==
- Cayetano Heredia University

== Bibliography ==
- León-Velarde F., A. Gamboa., J.A. Chuquiza, W.A. Esteba, M. Rivera-Ch. and C. Monge C. Hematological parameters in high altitude Andean Residents living at 4355, 4660 and 5500 meters above sea level. [High Altitude Med&Biol]. 1(2): 97-104, 2000.
- León-Velarde F., M. Rivera-Chira, J-A. Palacios, R. Tapia, Huicho L., and C. Monge C. Relationship of ovarian hormones to hypoxemia in women resident of 4,300 m. Am. J. Physiol. Regul. Integr. Comp. Physiol. 280(2): R488-R493, 2001.
- Vargas, M., D. Jimenez, F. León-Velarde, J. Osorio and J.P. Mortola. Circadian patterns in men acclimatized to intermittent hypoxia. Respir Physiol. 126: 233-243, 2001.
- Monge C., León-Velarde F., and A. Arregui. Chronic mountain sickness. In: High Altitude. An Exploration of Human Adaptation. Series: Lung Biology in Health and Disease. Edited by C. Lenfant. Marcel Dekker, Inc. N.Y. pp. 815–838, 2001.
- Huicho, L., I.G. Pawson, F. León-Velarde, M. Rivera-Chira, A. Pacheco, M. Muro, and J. Silva. Oxygen saturation and heart rate in healthy school children and adolescents living at high altitude. [Am. J. Hum. Biol.] 13:761-770, 2001.
- Tapia Ramirez, F. León-Velarde, L. Bernardi. Modulation of autonomic cardiovascular function in Andean high-altitude natives with and without chronic mountain sickness. J. Appl Physiol. 2003 94(1): 213-219, 2003.
- Rivera-Ch M, Gamboa A, León-Velarde F, Palacios J-A, O’Connor D. and Robbins P.A. High altitude natives living at sea level acclimatize to high altitude like sea level natives. [J. Applied Physiol.] 94(3): 1263-1268, 2003.
- Fatemian M, Gamboa A, León-Velarde F, Rivera-Ch M, Palacios J-A, and Robbins P.A. Ventilatory response to CO2 in high altitude natives and patients with chronic mountain sickness. [J. Applied Physiol.] 94(3): 1279-1287, 2003.
- Brutsaert TD, Parra EJ, Shriver MD, Gamboa A, Palacios JA, Rivera M, Rodriquez I, León-Velarde F. Spanish genetic admixture is associated with larger VO2max decrement from sea level to 4,338 meters in Peruvian Quechua. [J Appl Physiol.] 95(2) : 519-528, 2003.
- León-Velarde F, McCullough RG, McCullough RE, Reeves JT; CMS Consensus Working Group. Proposal for scoring severity in chronic mountain sickness (CMS). Background and conclusions of the CMS Working Group. Adv Exp Med Biol. 2003;543:339-54.
- Bernardi L, Roach RC, Keyl C, Spicuzza L, Passino C, Bonfichi M, Gamboa A, Gamboa J, Malcovati L, Schneider A, Casiraghi N, Mori A, León-Velarde F. Ventilation, autonomic function, sleep and erythropoietin. Chronic mountain sickness of Andean natives. Adv Exp Med Biol. 2003;543:161-75.
- Spicuzza L, Casiraghi N, Gamboa A, Keyl C, Schneider A, Mori A, León-Velarde F, Di Maria GU, Bernardi L. Sleep-related hypoxaemia and excessive erythrocytosis in Andean high altitude natives. [Eur Respir J]. 2004; 23(1):41-46.
- Reeves JT and León-Velarde F. Chronic Mountain Sickness: Recent studies of the relationship between hemoglobin concentration and oxygen transport. [High Alt. Med and Biol]. 2004; 5(2): 147-155.
- Claydon V.E., L.J. Norcliffe, J.P. Moore, M. Rivera-Ch, F. León-Velarde, O. Appenzeller and R. Hainsworth. Orthostatic tolerance and blood volumes in Andean high altitude dwellers. [Exp Physiol]. 2004; 89(5): 565-571.
- Mejia OM, Prchal JT, León-Velarde F, Hurtado A, Stockton DW. Genetic association analysis of chronic mountain sickness in an Andean high altitude population. [Haematologica]. 90(1):13-19, 2005.
