= Carlos Vidal Layseca =

Peruvian physician and politician

Rector of Cayetano Heredia University
- In office 1994–1999
- Preceded by: Roger Guerra Garcia
- Succeeded by: Ozwaldo Zegarra

Minister of Health
- In office 28 July 1990 – 18 February 1991
- Preceded by: Paul Caro Gamarra
- Succeeded by: Víctor Yamamoto Miyakawa

Personal details
- Born: 4 February 1931 Lima, Peru
- Died: 24 September 2017 (aged 86) Lima, Peru
- Occupation: physician

Carlos Vidal Layseca (4 February 1931 – 24 September 2017) was a Peruvian physician. He led the Ministry of Health from 1990 to 1991 and later served as rector of Cayetano Heredia University between 1994 and 1999.
