= Humberto Guerra Allison =

Peruvian physician and scientist (born 1940)

Humberto Guerra Allison (born 1940), is a physician and scientist. He graduated from Universidad Peruana Cayetano Heredia (MD) and Baylor College of Medicine (PhD in Microbiology). With Hugo Lumbreras, he co-founded a Tropical Medicine Institute at Cayetano Heredia University, the Instituto de Medicina Tropical Alexander von Humboldt at Lima, Peru. Guerra later directed the Institute.

Guerra's research focuses on the pathogenesis and immunology of bacterial diseases including brucellosis, leishmania and tuberculosis. He is the head of the Clinical Microbiology Laboratory at the IMT AvH.j

In 1981, he was a member of a commission of international experts sent by the United Nations to Thailand and Pakistan to investigate the possible use of chemical weapons by Soviet troops. As a result of this experience, he liked to say that one of his greatest achievements was getting his shoes dirty.

== Awards ==
In 2021, Guerra won the Esteban Campodónico Prize in the area of outstanding professional activity in service to Peruvian society.

== Sources ==
The Peru Report's Guide to Top People in Peru. Vol 1, p 303, 1992
