= Patricia J. García =

Peruvian professor

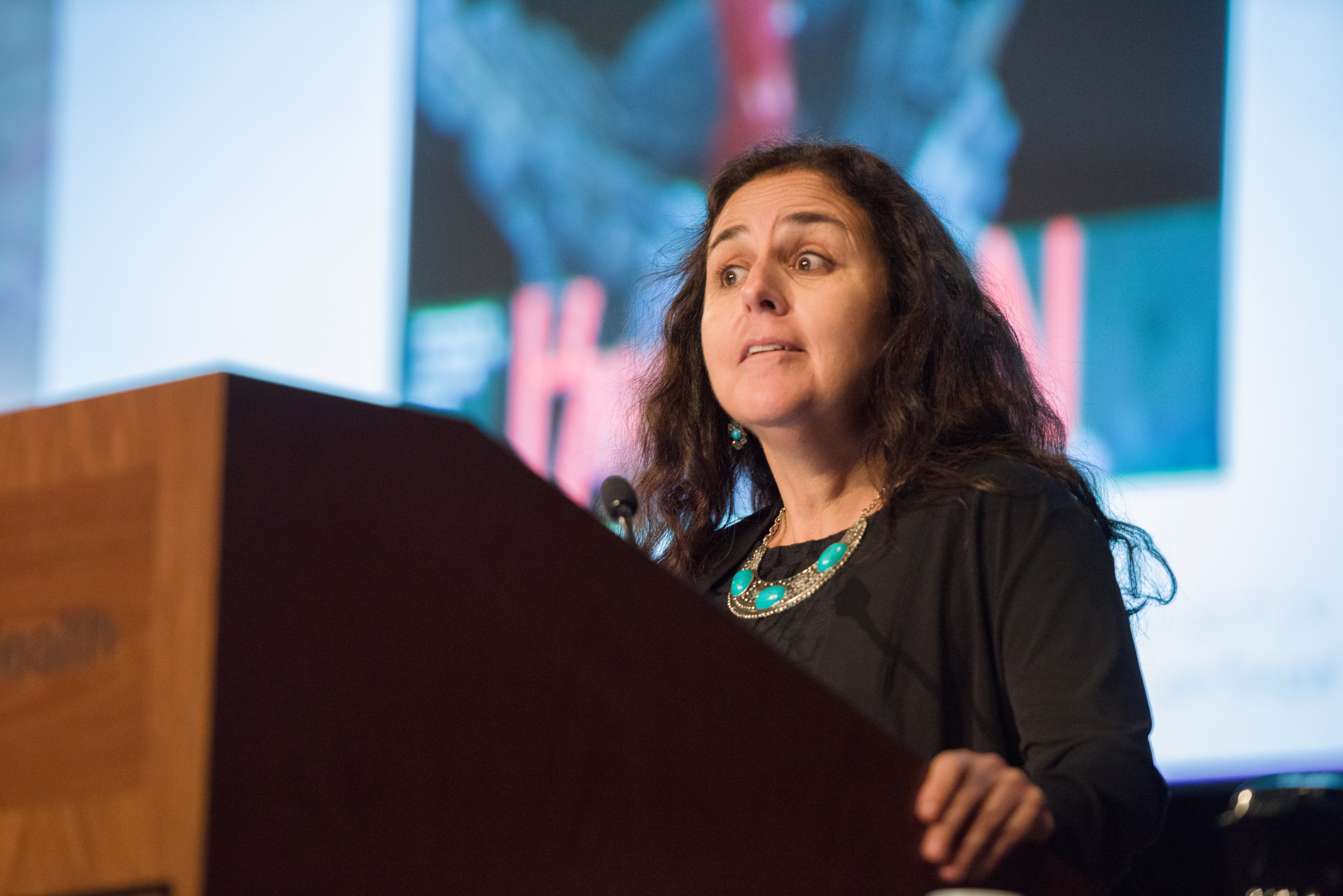
- Born: Lima, Peru
- Education: Cayetano Heredia University; University of Washington
- Awards: Member of the National Academy of Medicine
- Scientific career
- Fields: Global health Public health Sexually transmitted diseases Reproductive health
- Workplaces: Ministry of Health (Peru)

Patricia Jannet García Funegra is a Peruvian professor of public and global health at Cayetano Heredia University. She originally trained as a clinician before focusing on research and public health. Her work also focuses on reproductive health, sexually transmitted diseases, and medical informatics. In 2016-17 García was the Minister of Health of Peru. She was the first Peruvian to be elected to the US National Academy of Medicine in 2016.

== Early life ==
García was born in Lima, Peru to parents Olga Funegra Marcellini, a housewife, and Humberto García Taylor, a journalist. Her mother had emigrated from Huánuco.

== Education ==
García graduated from medical school at Cayetano Heredia University in 1988, becoming the first in her family to obtain a university degree. She later completed a Masters in Public Health (MPH), Epidemiology in 1998 at the University of Washington (UW) School of Public Health. In 2011, García completed a PhD at Cayetano Heredia University (UPCH).

== Career ==
In 1991, García moved to the US for a clinical residency program at Jackson Memorial Hospital with the University of Miami, and was Chief Medical Resident for 1993–94. She moved to Seattle as a postdoctoral fellow in infectious diseases at the University of Washington. She was encouraged to work here by Dr. King Holmes, who became García’s mentor. At UW she began training with the Fogarty International Centre International AIDS Research and Training Program. She stayed at UW to undertake a Masters in Public Health.

García returned to Lima in 1997, and worked at the Ministry of Health of Peru within the National STD/AIDS Control Program, developing guidelines for management of patients with STDs. In 1999, she became Associate Professor, Vice Dean, and Coordinator of the Epidemiology, STD and HIV Unit, at the School of Public Health at UPCH. She was granted full professorship in 2004. García helped establish the Global Health Demonstration Program at UPCH in 2006. This National Institutes of Health-funded program aimed to support training of global health scholars, improve inclusion of researchers from the Global South in global health policy making, and strengthen the use of research in policy making.

She was also the Chief of Peru's National Health Institutes from 2006-2008, the first woman in the country to hold that position. During her term, the Institutes developed a national programme on STDs, supported development of a critically acclaimed web-based laboratory information system (NETLAB), and placed a stronger focus on neglected diseases and environmental health issues such as human bartonellosis, hydatid disease, and traffic accidents.

In 2011, García became Dean of the School of Public Health at UPCH, a position she held until 2016. During this time she helped introduce a new undergraduate training program in Public Health and Global Health at the university. She held a Menschel Senior Leadership Fellowship at the Harvard T.H. Chan School of Public Health in 2018; teaching a course on leadership and development in global health.

García served as Regional Director of the Latin American and Caribbean Association for the Control of STIs from 2006-2011, and as President from 2011-16. She has also served on WHO committees for topics including reproductive health and human papillomavirus vaccines. She is currently a high level advisory board member of the Lancet Countdown on Health and Climate Change.

== Other activities ==
- University of Washington, Member of the External Advisory Board of the Department of Global Health
- WomenLift Health, Member of the Global Advisory Board
- Coalition for Epidemic Preparedness Innovations (CEPI), Member of the Board (–2021)

== Awards and honours ==
García became the first Peruvian to be elected to US National Academy of Medicine in 2016.
