= Ernesto Bustamante =

Peruvian molecular biologist (born 1950)

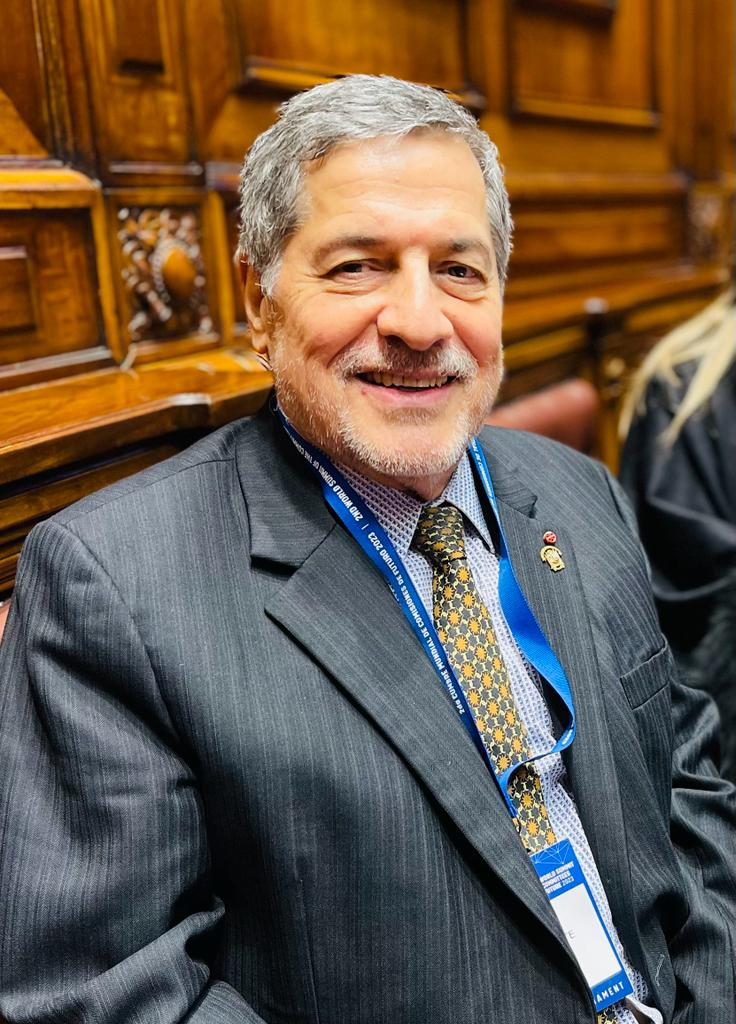

Member of Congress
- Incumbent
- Assumed office 26 July 2021
- Constituency: Lima

Personal details
- Born: 19 May 1950 (age 76) Lima, Peru
- Party: Popular Force (2020-present)
- Education: National Defense University (Diploma in Biological Weapons and Weapons of Mass Destruction); Johns Hopkins University School of Medicine (Ph. D. in Biochemistry and Cell & Molecular Biology); Cayetano Heredia University (M. Sc. in Biochemistry and B.S. in Biology)

Ernesto Bustamante (born May 19, 1950) is a scientist known for his expertise and contributions to the field of molecular biology. He is currently also a politician and member of the Parliament of Peru.

== Academia ==
He served as professor of biochemistry at Cayetano Heredia University (Lima, Peru) during eight years (1977–1984). He also was visiting professor, research professor, visiting researcher, or research scholar at the following institutions: Johns Hopkins University School of Medicine (Baltimore, Maryland, USA) [1979, 1980, 1981, 1984], Universidad de Chile Facultad de Ciencias (Santiago, Chile) [1980, 1981], and more recently at the School of Medicine of the University of North Carolina at Chapel Hill (Chapel Hill, North Carolina, USA) [2002–2005].

Bustamante was a fellow from the Ford Foundation, The Commonwealth Fund of New York, Eli Lilly and Company's Pre-doctoral Fellowship in Biology, DuPont, and The Rockefeller Foundation. In 2003, he was awarded competitively a Breast Cancer Concept Award by the U.S. Department of Defense as recommended by the Congressionally-directed Medical Research Programs. He has published over thirty peer-reviewed original research articles (Google Scholar) in the specialty of mitochondrial bioenergetics and molecular biology.

His largest contribution to biochemistry and cell biology was to demonstrate that the mitochondrial hexokinase is the enzyme responsible for driving the high rates of glycolysis that occur under aerobic conditions characteristic of rapidly growing malignant tumor cells. Since then, aerobic glycolysis by malignant tumors is utilized clinically to diagnose and monitor treatment responses of cancers by imaging uptake of 2-^{18}F-2-deoxyglucose (a radioactive modified hexokinase substrate) with positron emission tomography (PET).

In 2005, he published a research article that demonstrates that the functional association of glucokinase (a hexokinase isoform) to mitochondrial metabolism and intracellular signaling of apoptosis in normal liver is actually not mediated by a physical association of this enzyme with mitochondria or either their inner membrane or outer membrane as proposed by others.

== Corporate work ==
Bustamante was founding president and managing director (1978–2001) of AB Chimica Laboratorios SA, the first Peruvian company dedicated to manufacturing diagnostic kits and medical devices for use in clinical laboratories. He also was founding president and managing director [1985–2001) of BelgaMedica SA, a leading clinical laboratory originally associated with Laboratoire Central, at the time the largest clinical laboratory in Belgium. BelgaMedica was the laboratory that in 1985 identified serologically the first eight cases of HIV infection in Peru.

He was the first exclusive representative in Peru for Myriad Genetics specializing in molecular detection of propensity to hereditary cancer. Bustamante is scientific director of BioGenomica , a company specializing in DNA paternity & parentage testing and cancer molecular genetics, serving the Peruvian and international markets. He also serves as international consultant on biomedical, biodefense, food safety, agricultural, mining biotech, and global health security matters.

He also was technical and commercial representative of U.S. and European companies in the medical and clinical diagnostics fields, such as with the Société Française d’Équipement Hospitalier, managing a French-government funded, six-million dollar project that entailed the partial renovation of Hospital Arzobispo Loayza (Lima, Peru) between 1996 and 2000.

In the area of public diffusion of science, he has contributed hundreds of conferences and lectures and written numerous newspaper and magazine articles, in the fields of clinical chemistry, medical biotechnology, medical biochemistry, molecular genetics, lipid biochemistry, genetically modified food, genetically modified organisms, irradiated food, and in the area of DNA technology for paternity analysis. The conferences and lectures have been given at various universities and professional organizations, including Colegio Médico del Perú, Colegio de Abogados de Lima, Colegio de Biólogos del Perú, Sociedad Peruana de Medicina General, and others.

He has made multidisciplinary contributions to Peruvian society such as:

- Campaign against deceitful advertising on labels and inappropriate use of Omega-3 and Omega-6 as food additives in milk and eggs, which resulted in an investigation by the regulatory agency, Indecopi, against certain food-processing companies.
- Successful identification of human remains of eleven officers of the Peruvian Navy, disappeared at the Nanay River (a tributary to the Amazon River), using forensic DNA analysis.
- DNA analysis methodology for the correct identification of hundreds of cadavers of victims of the catastrophic fire that destroyed the "Mesa Redonda" Shopping Center.
- Food and Products of Transgenic Origin (GMO): their impact on the Peruvian economy.

== Public activities ==
Bustamante has regularly published articles on political analysis in Peruvian newspapers and magazines; he has been a political analyst and Op-Ed columnist for the leading Peruvian newspaper El Comercio. As to his political contributions, during the legislative period 2000–2001 he served as ad honorem consultant on the Comisión de Reforma de Códigos of the Congress of Peru and a member of the Study Group in charge of a Legislative Bill, that proposed norms to protect the human genetic patrimony and to prevent and criminalize discrimination on the basis of genetic factors. This became Law 27636 that modified Art. 324 of the Peruvian Penal Code. During the legislative period 2001–2002, he served as ad honorem consultant on the SubComisión de Ciencia y Tecnología of the Congress of Peru. This produced Law 28303, or Law of Science, Technology and Technological Innovation.

In 2001, Bustamante was named as national expert on the National Biosafety Group of Consejo Nacional del Ambiente, CONAM (National Environmental Council). In 2005 he was designated president of a transitory committee in charge of writing a new Bill to regulate the work of biologists to be presented to the Congress of Peru. The resulting proposal was passed by Congress in 2006 and is now Law 28847. Between 2001 and 2005 he administered the Internet science interest group Biologia run by the Red Científica Peruana consisting of over 450 members. He is a consultant to the Internet sexuality group Sexalud, run by Terra Lycos for Spain and Latin America.

In 2007, Bustamante was elected to serve a two-year term as president (National Dean) of the Colegio de Biólogos del Perú , a professional organization -created by law- consisting presently of over 18,000 registered biologists. In May 2008 he was elected to serve a one-year term as member of the Board of Directors of the Consejo Nacional de Decanos de los Colegios Profesionales del Perú (CDCP), which is a federation -created by law- of deans from over 30 recognized professional organizations in Peru encompassing about 700,000 professional graduates. In 2009, Bustamante was re-elected to the National Board of the Colegio de Biólogos del Perú, this time to serve as vice-president during a two-year term (2009–2011).

In 2008, Bustamante was elected member of the board of directors of the Consejo Nacional del Ambiente, CONAM -the top national environmental authority that also ruled on biodiversity and biosafety issues, now replaced by the Ministry of the Environment. In August 2011, he was designated by presidential appointment as General Director of Mining Environmental Affairs at the Ministry of Energy and Mines. He served until November 2011, when the first Humala Cabinet -headed by Prime Minister Salomon Lerner- fell due to the political consequences of social and environmental conflicts between mining companies and the neighboring populations that took place in the provinces of Tacna and Cajamarca. His office was responsible for approval of Environmental Impact Assessments presented by mining companies. He reformulated a project -and thus obtained budgetary approval for US$29 million from the Ministry of Economy- for remediation of rivers and their basins heavily polluted by past mining endeavors in the province of Puno

He is considered an opinion leader in the matter of potential impact of GMOs on biodiversity in Peru and their safety, and is an advocate of the benefits of modern biotechnology on the economy.

From August 2013 until July 2014 he headed the National Biotechnology Program of the National Council for Science, Technology & Technological Innovation of Peru (Concytec). From July 2014 until March 2015, he served -by presidential appointment- as Chief of the National Institute of Health of Peru (INS) . From March 2017 until August 2018, he served -by presidential appointment - as Head of the National Fisheries Health Agency of Peru, SANIPES .

In March 2019 Bustamante was elected to the National Academy of Sciences of Peru . In May 2019 he received the Samuel P. Asper Award for Achievement in Advancing International Medical Education presented by the Johns Hopkins Medical & Surgical Association of the Johns Hopkins University School of Medicine .

In April 2021, Bustamante was elected Member of the Parliament of Peru to serve for five years (2021-2026). In parliament, he served as Chairman of the Foreign Affairs Committee. He currently serves as Vice-Chairman of the Consumer Affairs Committee, and is full member of the Foreign Affairs Committee, the Health & Population Committee, the Science, Technology & Innovation Committee, the Foreign Trade & Tourism Committee, the National Defense Committee, and the Subcommittee on Constitutional Accusations.. During his tenure, he would join the Madrid Charter, an international alliance comprising right-wing and far-right individuals.

In October 2022, in Kigali, Rwanda, Bustamante was elected by the Inter-Parliamentary Union (IPU) to serve, for an initial period of two years, as a member of the Bureau of the IPU Standing Committee on United Nations Affairs (Special Political and Decolonization or Fourth Committee) . In 2024, at the meeting held in Geneva, Switzerland, his mandate was extended until October 2026.

In July 2023, Bustamante was elected to serve as Chairman of the Congressional Special Committee to Oversee the Process of Incorporation of Peru to the Organisation for Economic Co-operation and Development, OECD .
