= Instituto de Medicina Tropical Alexander von Humboldt =

Peruvian research institute

The Instituto de Medicina Tropical Alexander von Humboldt (IMTAvH) is a tropical medicine institute at Cayetano Heredia University in Lima, Peru. It was founded in 1968, under the direction of Prof. Hugo Lumbreras Cruz (1924 - 1985), a distinguished Peruvian doctor and parasitologist. His work as Director was continued by Dr. Humberto Guerra Allison and later by Dr. Eduardo Gotuzzo Herencia. The Instituto de Medicina Tropical Alexander von Humboldt has ongoing investigations in tuberculosis, leishmaniasis, malaria and HIV, both in its site in Lima and in several field sites such as Iquitos, Cuzco and La Merced.
