= Joseph Vinetz =

Professor of Medicine and Anthropology

Joseph Michael Vinetz
- Occupations: Medical expert, academic and researcher
- Awards: Bailey K. Ashford Medal, American Society of Tropical Medicine and Hygiene; Fellow, American Society of Tropical Medicine and Hygiene; Fellow, American College of Physicians; Fellow, Infectious Diseases Society of America

Academic background
- Education: B.S., Yale University; M.D., University of California, San Diego

Joseph Michael Vinetz is a professor of medicine and anthropology at Yale University, research professor at the Universidad Peruana Cayetano Heredia and Associate Investigator of the Alexander von Humboldt Institute of Tropical Medicine at the Universidad Peruana Cayetano Heredia.

Vinetz has focused his research on infectious diseases, including general infectious diseases and tropical diseases. He has specific research interests and accomplishments spanning basic science to field work in the areas of malaria, brucellosis and leptospirosis.

== Education ==
Vinetz studied at Yale College, majoring in Biology and History of Science & Medicine in 1985. He received his medical degree from the University of California, San Diego (UCSD) in 1991, and completed his residency in internal medicine in 1994 and a fellowship in infectious diseases in 1998 at the Johns Hopkins School of Medicine. During this time period, he was also a Howard Hughes Medical Institute Physician Postdoctoral Fellow at the National Institutes of Health.

== Career ==
Vinetz joined the University of Texas Medical Branch in 1998 as assistant professor and then as Associate Professor of Pathology and of Medicine till 2003. In 2003, he moved to the University of California, San Diego as associate professor, and was promoted to Professor with tenure in 2007. He's also an Associated Investigator at the Alexander von Humboldt Institute of Tropical Medicine at the Universidad Peruana Cayetano Heredia, in Lima, Peru. He joined Yale University School of Medicine as a Professor of Medicine in 2018 and later on was appointed to a secondary appointment as Professor of Anthropology in the Yale University Faculty of Arts and Sciences in 2020.

He also had clinical appointments, as attending physician at the University of Texas Medical Branch from 1998 to 2003, and at University of California San Diego Medical Center from 2003 to 2018. In 2020, he held a brief appointment as attending physician with disaster privileges related to COVID-19 at Yale New Haven Hospital. He is an attending physician at the VA Medical Center in West Haven.

== Research ==
Vinetz's work is focused on vaccines for tropical infectious diseases, encompassing mechanistic molecular biology, biochemistry, immunology and cell biology approaches to the translational research of malaria, leptospirosis and brucellosis.

=== Infectious Diseases ===
Vinetz's research in global health and infectious diseases takes a large scale, public health and epidemiological perspective—from Peru, Brazil, and Sri Lanka. It's focused on public health issues of highest consequence, while simultaneously pursuing translational research from the bench to the bedside, with a key focus on vaccine development.

==== Leptospirosis ====
Vinetz found cases of severe leptospirosis in relation to environmental exposure and social inequity in Baltimore in the 1990s, which was published in the Annals of Internal Medicine in 1996. He caught rats in Baltimore and showed that nearly all were chronically infected by L. interrogans. In this way he led epidemiologic investigation to determine the epidemiology of patients with leptospirosis who acquired L. interrogans in inner-city Baltimore. He found out a risk element in context of urban residents who were sporadically exposed to rat urine in the inner city as inner-city rats were seemed to carry L. interrogans. A paper published in 2003 discussed the worldwide occurrence and spread rate of leptospirosis, and highlighted pulmonary hemorrhage with refractory shock as a major manifestation. Furthermore, he concurred with published recommendations to use tetracyclines and β—lactam/cephalosporins as mainstays of the treatment of leptospirosis.

In 2005, Vinetz demonstrated the underdiagnosis of leptospirosis in the Amazon jungle of Peru (Iquitos city, Loreto department), a region of high endemicity and the underrecognition of grave pulmonary complications, and discovered the pulmonary involvement in leptospirosis in urban but not rural areas related to the leptospiral strains found in the environment. He also drew a comparative analysis between the levels of Leptospira in urban and rural environmental surface waters in sites in the Peruvian Amazon region of Iquitos. Findings of his study indicated urban severe leptospirosis in the Peruvian Amazon to be associated with higher concentrations of more pathogenic leptospires at sites of exposure and transmission. He proposed the application of this risk assessment of environmental surface waters in terms of evaluating risk for leptospiral infection and severe disease in leptospirosis-endemic regions. Furthermore, he conducted a study in 2004 focused on the potential relationships of environmental context to human exposure to Leptospira and disease associated with seroconversion.

Vinetz led an international consortium of leptospirosis researchers that led to a paper in which 310 strains of Leptospira were analyzed whole genome sequencing. A cross-species comparative genome analysis of all 22 species known at the time produced the first definitive phylogeny of Leptospira, along with identification of novel virulence factor genes and gene families, towards the goal of addressing broad questions of how pathogen virulence evolves.

==== Malaria ====
Vinetz has active research programs which comprise wide-ranging investigations of Plasmodium biology and malaria epidemiology. Vinetz has focused on mechanisms of parasite-mosquito interactions, immunology of blood stage malaria, and transmission-blocking vaccine development, including, in collaboration with Stephen Mayfield at UCSD, the use of recombinant algae to produce P. falciparum and P. vivax vaccine candidates. He studies endemic malaria in the context of the Peruvian Amazon region of Iquitos and discussed the emergence of chloroquine-resistant Plasmodium falciparum and the marked increase in the incidence of P. vivax malaria as significant factors in highlighting malaria control as a major priority of Peruvian public health efforts.

==== Brucellosis ====
In 2014, Vinetz explored a protein-conjugate approach to develop a monoclonal antibody-based antigen detection test regarding the diagnosis of human brucellosis. He also used systems immunology to study the serial kinetics of the antibody response against the complete brucella melitensis ORFeome in context of focal vertebral brucellosis, while presenting a case of focal vertebral brucellosis in a 71-year-old Mexican-American woman who contracted infection from unpasteurized goat milk. He is the first to determine the kinetics of the human antibody responses in terms of complete repertoire of proteins encoded by a bacterial genome and to highlight fundamentally different immunopathogenetic mechanisms between acute human brucellosis and chronic human brucellosis.

=== Genomic Analysis of Plasmodium Vivax ===
Vinetz along with co-authors published a paper in 2016 and explored the effect of demographic history and selective pressures in context of the P. vivax genome by sequencing 182 clinical isolates sampled from 11 countries across the globe, using hybrid selection to overcome human DNA contamination. He also conducted a microarray analysis of ex vivo Plasmodium vivax, which provided a data set regarding the comparative analysis with a potential for identifying markers for global parasite diversity and drug resistance mapping studies.

== Awards and honors ==
- 2003 - Fellow, Infectious Diseases Society of America
- 2003 - Fellow, American College of Physicians
- 2011 - Fellow, American Society of Tropical Medicine and Hygiene
- 2011 - Bailey K. Ashford Medal, American Society of Tropical Medicine and Hygiene
- 2014 - Honorary Professor, Rajarata University of Sri Lanka
- 2014 - Doctor Honoris Causa, Universidad de la Amazonia Peruana Iquitos, Peru
- 2018 - Distinguished Medical Scientist for the chair in the name of 'Late P.N. Chuttani', Postgraduate Institute for Medical Education and Research (PGIMER), Chandigarh, India

== Bibliography ==
- Vinetz, J. M., Glass, G. E., Flexner, C. E., Mueller, P., & Kaslow, D. C. (1996). Sporadic urban leptospirosis. Annals of internal medicine, 125(10), 794–798.
- Bharti, A. R., Nally, J. E., Ricaldi, J. N., Matthias, M. A., Diaz, M. M., Lovett, M. A., ... & Peru—United States Leptospirosis Consortium. (2003). Leptospirosis: a zoonotic disease of global importance. The Lancet infectious diseases, 3(12), 757-771.
- Johnson, M. A., Smith, H., Joseph, P., Gilman, R. H., Bautista, C. T., Campos, K. J., ... & Vinetz, J. M. (2004). Environmental exposure and leptospirosis, Peru. Emerging infectious diseases, 10(6), 1016.
- Segura, E. R., Ganoza, C. A., Campos, K., Ricaldi, J. N., Torres, S., Silva, H., ... & Peru–United States Leptospirosis Consortium. (2005). Clinical spectrum of pulmonary involvement in leptospirosis in a region of endemicity, with quantification of leptospiral burden. Clinical infectious diseases, 40(3), 343–351.
- Ganoza, C. A., Matthias, M. A., Collins-Richards, D., Brouwer, K. C., Cunningham, C. B., Segura, E. R., ... & Vinetz, J. M. (2006). Determining risk for severe leptospirosis by molecular analysis of environmental surface waters for pathogenic Leptospira. PLoS Med, 3(8), e308.
- Cannella, A. P., Lin, J. C., Liang, L., Atluri, V., Gotuzzo, E., Felgner, P. L., ... & Vinetz, J. M. (2012). Serial kinetics of the antibody response against the complete Brucella melitensis ORFeome in focal vertebral brucellosis. Journal of clinical microbiology, 50(3), 922–926.
- Fouts, D. E., Matthias, M. A., Adhikarla, H., Adler, B., Amorim-Santos, L., Berg, D. E., ... & Vinetz, J. M. (2016). What makes a bacterial species pathogenic?: comparative genomic analysis of the genus Leptospira. PLoS neglected tropical diseases, 10(2), e0004403.
