= Gonzalo Castro de la Mata =

Peruvian ecologist

- Born: Gonzalo Castro de la Mata Valdivia; Lima, Peru
- Occupations: Ecologist, writer

Gonzalo Castro de la Mata (full name Gonzalo Castro de la Mata Valdivia) is a Peruvian ecologist and writer born in Lima, Peru. He is recognized as a global leader in the promotion of sustainability with emphasis on innovative free market solutions to environmental issues.

== Education ==
Castro de la Mata received a Ph.D. in Ecology and Population Biology from the University of Pennsylvania in 1988, and M.Sc. in Biophysics (1985) and B.Sc. in Biology (1983) degrees from Cayetano Heredia University in Lima, Peru.

== Career ==
Gonzalo Castro de la Mata became the first Executive Director of the Earthna Center for a Sustainable Future in Doha, in 2022. He has been the Chairman of the World Bank's Inspection Panel, and the founder of Ecosystem Services LLC, a company that generates carbon offsets through avoiding deforestation of the Amazon rainforest (REDD). Previously, he was the Managing Director of Sustainable Forestry Management (SFM) for the Americas, where he was responsible for seminal investments that generated some of the first carbon credits from native plantations and forest conservation, globally.

He has also been the Head of Biodiversity at the Global Environment Facility, the largest source of funds to address global environmental challenges, and a Lead Environmental Specialist at the World Bank. He was also Director of WWF’s Latin American and Caribbean Program in Washington, and founder and CEO of Wetlands for the Americas. Earlier in his career, Castro de la Mata published widely in the scientific literature on the ecology and energetics of long distance bird migration, with emphasis on migratory shorebirds. Some important papers include "Assimilation Efficiency of Sanderlings (Calidris alba) Feeding on Horseshoe Crab (Limulus polyphemus) Eggs" and "Ecology and Energetics of Sandlerlings Migrating to Four Latitudes".

== Board memberships and awards ==
Castro de la Mata has been involved in the founding of leading international conservation organizations, including Wetlands for the Americas (today Wetlands International), and American Bird Conservancy, where he served as a board member for six years.

He has served as chair of the Independent Advisory Panel on Development Issues in South-Central Peru, focusing on the Camisea project. The final report of the Panel is the most comprehensive account of this complex project. In 2013, he was one of the two high-level independent international experts engaged by the United Nations to assess the social end ecological impacts of the Barro Blanco Dam in Panama, which found serious consultation deficiencies in indigenous communities. He has also served as president of various companies, and as a member of the Supervisory Council of Wetlands International, where he was appointed Counselor of Honor in 2021. He was recognized by the United States Forest Service with the Outstanding Achievement in Conservation Award in 2017.

In 2021, he was appointed as a member of the Independent Oversight Advisory Committee of the International Labour Organization (ILO) for the period 2022 - 2024. In 2026, he became the Chair of the Committee.

As a writer, in 2014 he was awarded the Prize "Peruanos al Bicentenario" (Bicentennial Prize) by Diario El Comercio in the Environmental Category for his essay "Pais de Leyenda".

== Media and press appearances ==
He has appeared in numerous publications in topics related to ecology, environment, mining, oil and gas, and sustainable development, and is a regular editorial contributor to El Comercio in Lima, Peru, Diario Altavoz, and The Peninsula in Doha.

== Books and publications ==
Published books include "Un Mendigo Sentado en un Banco de Oro: Reflexiones sobre Desarrollo y Medio Ambiente en el Peru" and the fictional work "12 Historias Macabras" (12 Macabre Stories). Other selected works include:

- Napoleon's Last Interview. People's, Spaces, Deliberation. The World Bank. 2015.
- Civilization, Civilizations, and Art at the World Bank.
- Pais de Leyenda. 2015. Diario El Comercio.
- Un Mendigo Sentado Sobre un Banco de Oro: Reflexiones sobre Desarrollo y Medio Ambiente en el Peru. 2005. 102 Pp., Lima, Peru.
- La Agenda Ambiental para el 2013. El Comercio. Enero 9, 2013.
- Seeking Opportunities from New Patterns in Global Trade. Pages 10–14 in: Sustainability Report 2010. Inter-American Development Bank (IDB), Washington, DC.
- Conservation Financing in Latin America and the Caribbean: The Long Road to Sustainability. 2002. WWF, Washington, DC.
- Mapping Conservation Investments: An Assessment of Biodiversity Funding in Latin America and the Caribbean. 2001. Biodiversity Support Program, Washington, DC. 80 Pp.
- The Global Water Crisis and Freshwater Ecosystem Conservation in Latin America and the Caribbean: Predicted Trends and Proposed Policy Responses. 1997. World Wildlife Fund, Washington, DC, 80 Pp.

== Personal life ==
He is the son of Ramiro Castro de la Mata y Caamaño and Elsa Valdivia Vargas.
