= Anna Chiappe =

Wife and chronicler of José Carlos Mariátegui

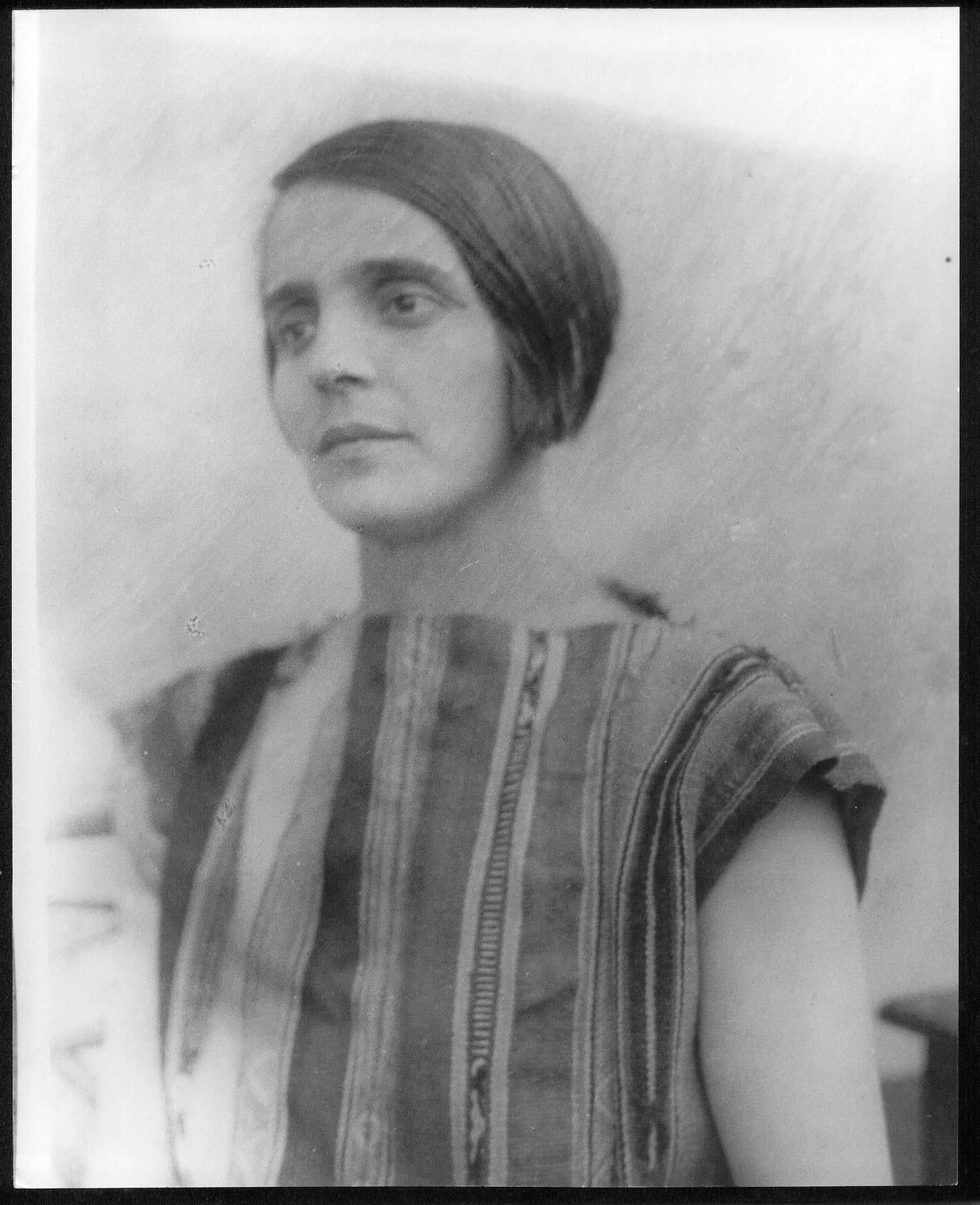
- Born: Anna Chiappe; 26 July 1898
- Died: 16 June 1990 (aged 91)
- Spouse: José Carlos Mariátegui
- Children: Sandro Mariátegui Chiappe; Sigfrido Mariátegui Chiappe; Javier Mariátegui Chiappe

Anna Chiappe Iacomini (born Anna Chiappa; 26 July 1898, Lucca, Italy - 16 June 1990) was an Italian-born woman who was the wife and chronicler of José Carlos Mariátegui.

== Life ==
Born in Italy, Iacomini was the daughter of Iacopa Iacomini and Domenico Chiappa, a coffee merchant who traveled frequently to Brazil. Iacomini spent her early years in Lucca and Siena. When she was 12 years old, her mother died. She moved to Florence for high school, but when she was 16, her father died, leading an uncle to provide for her.

Chiappa married the Peruvian journalist and intellectual José Carlos Mariátegui. The couple first lived in Rome where their first child, Sandro Mariátegui Chiappe, was born in 1921. On 11 February 1923 the family departed from Antwerp on the "Negada" steamer, arriving at Callao in Peru on 17 March 1923.

In 1924, Mariátegui's right leg was amputated. Iacomini nursed him back to health in a long convalescence. After a season in the "Leuro", Miraflores area, the family in 1925 settled in the Casa de Washington in Lima. The poem dedicated by José Carlos Mariátegui is known, entitled "The life you gave me".

Mariátegui died in April 1930. After his death Iacomini devoted the rest of her life to providing for their four children, preserving her husband's work, and publicizing it.

On 29 October 1975 Mariátegui was posthumously awarded the Order The Sun of Peru in the Officer's Degree in a ceremony held at the Palace of Torre Tagle. On 26 July 1986 Anna Chiappa received the Civic Medal of the City of Lima, on his eighty-fifth anniversary, at his home in Miraflores.

Chiappa Iacomini died on 16 June 1990.
