= Carlos Monge Medrano =

Peruvian physician

- Born: December 13, 1884; Lima, Peru
- Died: February 15, 1970 (aged 85); Lima, Peru
- Education: National University of San Marcos
- Known for: Monge's disease
- Scientific career
- Fields: Medicine
- Workplaces: National University of San Marcos

Carlos Monge Medrano (December 13, 1884 in Lima – February 15, 1970 in Lima) was a Peruvian physician specializing in high altitude medicine. Monge's disease is named after him.

== Early life and education ==
Born in Lima, Peru, Medrano joined the Faculty of Medicine of San Fernando in 1904, where he earned his medical degree. He continued his studies at the School of Tropical Medicine in London in 1912, and a year later returned to his alma mater to serve as professor.

== Career ==
In 1914, Medrano was appointed Head of Clinic of the Faculty of Medicine of the University. He was also head of ward No. 2 of the Arzobispo Loayza Hospital in 1925. He was Acting Rector of University of San Marcos from 1945 to 1946 and also directed the School of Higher Studies of this university from 1946 to 1957.

Monge discovered the clinical syndrome of chronic mountain sickness or altitude sickness. He was the first to describe its symptoms and pathogenesis. In 1928 he published the results of his research and that of his collaborators in a book entitled “The Disease of the Andes”, a valuable contribution to medical science. In 1929 this condition was named “Monge's Disease” by the Dean of the Faculty of Medicine at the Sorbonne.

In 1931, Monge suggested the creation of the National Institute of Andean Biology to the authorities of the University of San Marcos, and he became its Director in 1934.

Monge participated in many international conferences. He was a delegate from Peru to the International Medical Congress held in London in 1929; chairman of the delegation from Peru to the IX Pan American Sanitary Conference in 1934; Peru delegate to the Second Pan American Conference on Eugenics and Homicultura in 1934 and the Peruvian government delegate to the organization of the United Nations Educational, Scientific and Cultural Organization (UNESCO), in Mexico 1947.

In recognition of his medical work, Monge was elected president of the National Academy of Medicine from 1933 to 1936; member of the American Society for the advancement of science in 1934 and an honorary member of the Academy of Medicine of Buenos Aires, in 1934.

Monge also was vice president of International Studies Conference Stations of the Great Cultures, held in Switzerland in 1948; President of the Peruvian delegation of the II General Assembly of UNESCO in Beirut in 1948; Peru delegate at the Conference on Narcotic Drugs of the UN, New York in 1950; Rapporteur of the International Congress of Medicine in Buenos Aires in 1964, among other prestigious positions.

He was also honorary professor of the Faculty of Medical Sciences at the University of Cochabamba, Bolivia in 1947, a member of the Executive Council of the National Commission of Peru for Cooperation with UNESCO in 1962, as well as consultant on indigenous and tribal peoples of the International Labour Organization in 1962.

For his work as a professor, researcher and doctor at various hospitals, Dr. Monge was recognized and held in distinction by a number of educational and medical institutions. He was decorated with the Order of the Legion of Honor of France; Great Official of the Order of the Sun in Peru; Commander of the Order of the Condor of the Andes in Bolivia; as well as receiving a number of honorary titles.

Medrano published more than 150 scientific texts, whose main themes are medicine, parasitology, biology, Andean pathology, anthropology and history.
