= Cayetano Heredia =

Peruvian physician

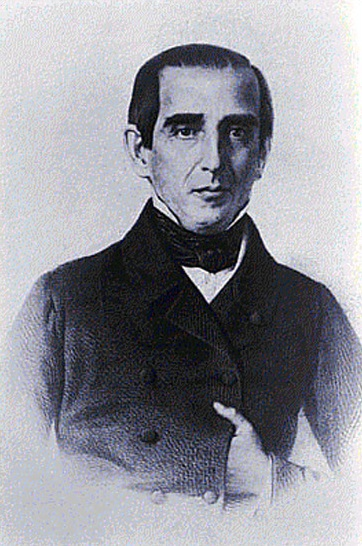
Cayetano Heredia

Cayetano Heredia (August 5, 1797 – June 11, 1861) was a Peruvian medical doctor, born in Catacaos, Piura, northwestern Peru. He studied medicine at the Royal College of Medicine and Surgery of the National University of San Marcos. Together with Hipólito Unanue, he was one of the two greatest Peruvian physicians of the 19th century. He happened to live through the tense period of the struggle for independence of Peru from Spain, and his participation in political life was as intense as the time and effort he devoted to medicine. He was the first dean of the Faculty of Medicine San Fernando (ex College of the Independence). He died in Lima on 1861.

Cayetano Heredia University, a Peruvian medical school founded in 1961, was named after him.
