= Honorio Delgado =

Peruvian psychiatrist (1892 - 1969)

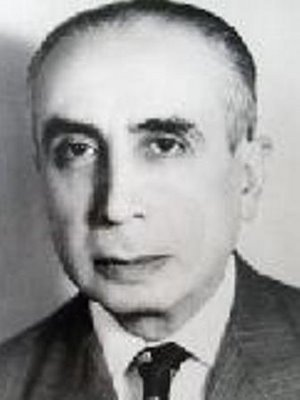
- Born: 27 September 1892; Arequipa
- Died: 27 November 1969 (aged 77); Lima
- Alma mater: National University of San Marcos; National University of San Agustín
- Occupation: Psychiatrist, philosopher
- Awards: Grand Cross of the Civil Order of Alfonso X the Wise (1949); Palmas Magisteriales (1965)

Honorio Delgado Espinosa (September 26, 1892 – November 28, 1969) was a Peruvian teacher, researcher, humanist, philosopher who was influenced by psychoanalysis, linguist, and scholar, born in Arequipa, Peru. Delgado graduated from the School of Psychology at the National University of San Marcos in Lima, Peru.

== Life ==
The early part of Delgado's career was marked by an adherence to Sigmund Freud's psychoanalytic principles and included frequent correspondence. By the mid-1930s, Delgado had developed an interest in phenomenology. He contributed to biological developments in the treatment of psychiatric disorders by the use of sodium nucleate in the management of psychotic agitation in 1917 and the use of phenobarbital for the control of seizures in 1919. He was the first in Latin America to try malaria therapy in the treatment of general paresis and the use of chlorpromazine in the treatment of schizophrenia. In 1957, he co-founded an international organization focused on neuropsychopharmacology, later known as the Collegium Internationale Neuro-Psychopharmacologicum (CINP), in Zurich, Switzerland.

Delgado was a member of the Real Academia Española, based in Madrid. He authored 450 articles and two dozen books on topics such as personality and character, the rehumanization of scientific culture, the spiritual formation of the individual, as well as ecology and existentialism. In 1918, he co-founded the first psychiatric journal in Latin America, Revista de Psiquiatría y Disciplinas Conexas (Journal of Psychiatry and Related Disciplines), the previous edition of the Revista de Psiquiatría (Journal of Psychiatry). In 1953, he published a textbook on psychiatry.

As Chairman of the Department of Psychiatry at San Marcos University for 30 years, Delgado recruited and mentored a group of academics and researchers that came to be known across Latin America as the Peruvian School of Psychiatry. One of his contributions to the field of psychopathology was the description of three fundamental concepts in the pathogenesis of schizophrenia: the disjunction between the inner and outer world of the patient (autism), the disjunction of the ego with respect to the content of consciousness, and the breakdown of basic categories of knowledge. He also anticipated the role of attention and cognition in the phenomenology of schizophrenia, a process that he called atelesis, or the failure in the intentionality of thought. Another one of Delgado's contributions was his development of the current psychiatric nomenclature, represented by the DSM series (Diagnostic and Statistical Manual of Mental Disorders). From the early 1950s, Delgado wanted descriptive diagnostic criteria that he thought should be accurate, free from ideological biases, based on multifactorial causality, include recognition of the biological basis of mental illness, and incorporate a hierarchy of descriptive criteria.

He emphasized the need for research to demonstrate diagnostic validity, and for the recognition of different levels of operations of the human psyche.
