= Rehumanization =

Rehumanization is the process by which one reverses the damage done by dehumanization. That is, in individuals or groups, the process of rehabilitating one’s way of perceiving the other(s) in question in one’s mind and in consequent behavior.

A study conducted at Princeton by Mary Wheeler and Susan Fiske (2005) showed that rehumanization can be reached by blocking brain activation which is usually suitable with the appearance of an individual. Wheeler and Fiske were able to help subjects unconsciously suppress the activation of “fight or flight”, and rehumanization was achieved when he or she was seen not as a category, racial or other, but as an individual: the researchers “primed” the subjects by asking them to guess whether the person whose face they were about to see liked coffee or tea, etc.

Recently, work by Cheshin and colleagues on Digital Emotional Labor, extended this work to the effort done in digital text-based interaction to reclaim that one is not an automated bot - but a real human - in an interaction online.

In general, rehumanization can usually be achieved by avoiding labels and stereotypes in one’s language and thoughts. Other techniques that have been found to be effective include:

- “deep listening,” involving the use of the imagination to see through what another is saying (in words or action). This technique is often taught, among other places, in the system called Nonviolent Communication.
- remembering that all humans share certain core needs and values; as Einstein said, “remember our humanity; and forget all the rest”
- guarding one’s thoughts and language to keep out stereotypes and labels
- avoiding media depictions and other outside influences that encourage such stereotyping.
