= Renato D. Alarcón =

American psychiatrist

- Born: Arequipa, Peru
- Education: Cayetano Heredia University
- Occupation: Emeritus Professor
- Organizations: American Psychiatric Association; American College of Psychiatrists
- Known for: Research into cultural psychiatry, mood disorders, personality disorders, and post-traumatic stress disorder.
- Notable work: The Psychotherapy of Hope: The Legacy of Persuasion and Healing

Renato D. Alarcón is an emeritus professor of Psychiatry at the Mayo Clinic College of Medicine and works at Cayetano Heredia University. He was born in Arequipa, Peru and would go on to graduate from Cayetano Heredia University as a surgeon in 1966. Renato did Psychiatric postgraduate training at Johns Hopkins Hospital in 1970, where we received his Master's degree in Public health. Today, he is a professor of psychiatry at the University of Alabama at Birmingham. Alarcón serves as the Deputy Chief of the Department of Psychiatry at Emory University. He was also the director of the Mood Disorders Unit at the Mayo Psychiatry and Psychology Treatment Center. The American Psychiatric Association named him Distinguished Life Fellow. The American College of Psychiatrists named him Fellow of the American College of Psychiatry. He primarily studies cultural psychiatry, mood disorders, personality disorders, and post-traumatic stress disorder.
