= Microscopic Observation Drug Susceptibility assay =

- Purpose: test for tuberculosis

The Microscopic Observation Drug Susceptibility assay (MODS) is a culture method shown to be more sensitive, faster and cheaper test than current culture-based tests for Tuberculosis. The Microscopic Observation Drug Susceptibility assay (MODS) involves direct observation of Mycobacterium tuberculosis and simultaneously yields drug-resistance.

== History of MODS ==
The discovery of the features of Mycobacterium tuberculosis growth detection which led to the development of MODS is attributed to Luz Caviedes working under the supervision of International Health professor Robert Gilman in his laboratories at the Cayetano Heredia University, Lima, Peru. The subsequent operational evaluation and refinement of the MODS methodology was the result of the combined effort of a coherent international research collaboration centred on Cayetano Heredia University, Johns Hopkins Bloomberg School of Public Health and Imperial College London.

In partnership with the ongoing implementation of MODS in regional reference laboratories by the Peruvian National Reference Laboratory at the National Institute of Health and the National TB Control Programme, this group is now leading the associated collaborative translational research (supported by the Wellcome Trust) which aims to answer the question “what is the optimal way to utilise MODS in a resource-limited programmatic setting?”

MODS is recommended by the WHO as an interim solution for developing countries who are waiting for the implementation of liquid culture methods.
