= Cayetano Heredia University =

Private nonprofit university in Lima, Peru

Coordinates: 12.0240°S 77.0565°W

- Universidad Peruana Cayetano Heredia
- Motto: Spiritus ubi vult spirat (The spirit spreads wherever it wants)
- Type: Private nonprofit university
- Established: September 22, 1961 (64 years ago)
- Academic affiliations: Consortium of Universities; THE
- Rector: Dr. Wilfredo Gonzáles Lozada
- Location: Av. Honorio Delgado 430, Urb. Ingeniería, San Martin de Porres, Lima, Peru
- Campus: Urban
- Website: cayetano.edu.pe

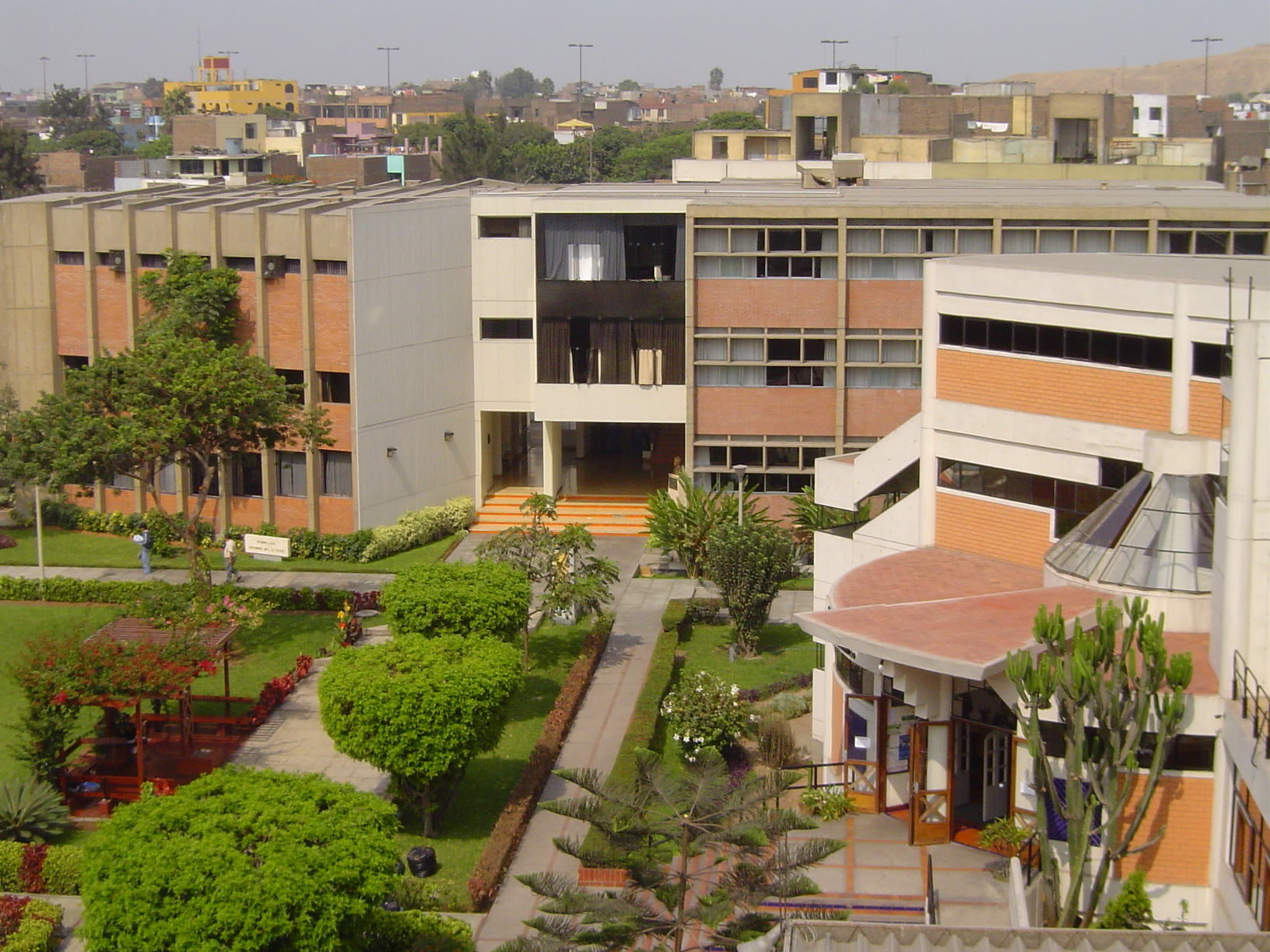
Campus in Lima Norte

Cayetano Heredia University (Spanish: Universidad Peruana Cayetano Heredia, UPCH; or simply Cayetano Heredia) is a private research university in Lima, Peru. It was named in honor of Cayetano Heredia, one of the eminent Peruvian physicians of the 19th century.

The university is overseen by a board of trustees and is not owned by any private or state entity. It is considered one of the best medical schools in Peru, along the "San Fernando" Faculty of Medicine of the National University of San Marcos (UNMSM), and is currently one of the biggest institutes of scientific research and output in the country.

Established in 1961 by professors and alumni of the UNMSM because of political disagreements with its board of directors, it consistently ranks among the top 3 institutes of higher education in Peru, top 50 in Latin America and is one of the leading 800 universities in the world.

Since 1996, it forms part of the Consortium of Universities as a founding member. It is formed by other 3 private higher education institutes considered the best in their respective fields; the Pontifical Catholic University of Peru specializing in social studies, Universidad del Pacífico in economics, and the University of Lima in business.

Today, it enrolls over 11,000 students, has over 20 majors organized in 8 faculties, a postgraduate school and international relations with other leading universities in the world. It produced multiple ministers of health, government officials and numerous scholars.

== History ==
The university was founded in 1961 by a group of professors and students from the medical school of the four-century-old National University of San Marcos in Lima. This group of students and professors expressed their strong disagreement with the current legislation, inspired by the APRA party interested in the absolute control of the university system in the country. The legislation advocated the "co-government" of all the state universities by the so-called "student one-third", which would politicize the academic enterprise. The dissenting group was led by Drs. Honorio Delgado and Alberto Hurtado, dean of the medical school at San Marcos. As their campaign to preserve academics failed, the 400 plus faculty members had no other option but to resign en masse, and found the new medical school as a private non-profit academic institution.

On September 22, the decree authorizing the new university school with the name of Private Peruvian University of Medical and Biological Sciences was issued. The official inauguration of the new university took place on June 18, 1962, with the assistance of the President of the Republic, Manuel Prado Ugarteche.

It would be on February 24, 1965, when the institution changes its name to the one it currently has: Cayetano Heredia University.

The first classes began in April 1962, in the old headquarters of the Colegio Sagrados Corazones Belén del Jirón de la Unión, and after the opening of the Cayetano Heredia National Hospital in 1967, they moved to the new headquarters of San Martín de Porres in 1968.

Some have suggested that these events were the subject of "prior arrangements/agreements" which, in the political context of the time, would have been practically impossible. 47 years later, Cayetano Heredia and San Marcos are the most prestigious medical schools in Peru.

=== Vaccine-Gate case ===
The Vaccine-gate case (Vacunagate in Spanish) is a case of corruption that occurred in the second half of 2020 and early 2021 with respect to an extra 1,000 batch of experimental vaccines from the pharmaceutical company Sinopharm granted to the Cayetano Heredia University destined for the Phase 3 clinical trials personnel. The controversy arose when it was discovered that some of this doses were given to senior officials of the Peruvian State (including the President of the Republic of Peru at that time: Martín Vizcarra and his minister of health Pilar Mazzetti), workers of the research project on the use of the vaccine in the Peruvian population and high University authorities, including the rector of the university Luis Varela Pinedo, his vice-rector José Ronald Espinoza Babilón and the researcher and ex-minister Patricia J. García, who among other authorities of the educational center, had to resign on February 18 as a result of the scandal. On February 16, the situation was aggravated when it was discovered that Germán Málaga Rodríguez, project leader at the Cayetano Heredia headquarters, administered three doses to 40 people, including himself and a deputy minister, irregularly and without written consent. On February 19, after an inspection in which various irregularities that violated the study protocol, good practices and ethical standards were corroborated, the National Institute of Health of Peru determined the departure of the principal investigator responsible, Germán Málaga, and suspended to the university as a center for conducting new clinical trials.

== Organization ==
=== Administration ===
The rectors of the university, since its foundation, are:

- Dr. Honorio Delgado (1962–1967)
- Dr. Alberto Hurtado (1967–1969)
- Dr. Carlos Monge (1970–1972)
- Dr. Enrique Fernandez (1973–1976)
- Dr. Alberto Cazorla (1976–1977, 1984–1989)
- Dr. Homero Silva (1977–1984)
- Dr. Roger Guerra Garcia (1989–1994)
- Dr. Carlos Vidal Layseca (1994–1999)
- Dr. Ozwaldo Zegarra (1999–2007)
- Dra. Fabiola Leon Velarde (2008–2017)
- Dr. Luis Varela Pinedo (2017–2021)
- Dr. Gustavo González Rengifo (2021)
- Dr. Enrique Castañeda Saldaña (2021–2026)
- Dr. Wilfredo Gonzáles Lozada (2026–2031)

=== Faculties ===
- Faculty of Medicine
- Faculty of Science and philosophy
- Faculty of Stomatology
- Faculty of Psychology
- Faculty of Nursing
- Faculty of Public health and Health Administration
- Faculty of Veterinary medicine and Animal breeding
- Faculty of Education

== Academics ==
Soon after its founding and during the following forty-plus years Cayetano Heredia University became a significant center of higher learning and scientific research in Peru. UPCH is credited with world-quality research in the area of health sciences in Peru.

It is a rather small school (under 2,000 students) that focuses on the disciplines of medicine, dentistry, natural sciences, public health, veterinary medicine, nursing, psychology, biotechnology and education. It grants baccalaureate degrees as well as master's and doctoral degrees in biochemistry, biotechnology, medicine, biology, and a Master of Health Administration.

In 2016, due to the new university licensing process by the National Superintendence of Higher University Education (SUNEDU), after complying with the basic conditions of educational quality, the UPCH was licensed, being the fifth private university to do and the second university to be licensed for a period of 10 years (something that only some universities such as the Catholic, San Agustin, Engineering and San Marcos achieved).

== Research ==
Cayetano Heredia University has established numerous agreements and collaborative arrangements with leading institutions from all over the world, including the Johns Hopkins University, University of Washington, University of California San Diego, University of California Berkeley, University of Alabama at Birmingham (UAB), London School of Tropical Medicine and Hygiene, the Prince Leopold Institute of Tropical Medicine in Belgium, and the University of Pennsylvania.

The Alexander von Humboldt Tropical Medicine Institute is among the top research institutions in tropical medicine in Latin America, with ongoing investigations in tuberculosis, leishmaniasis, malaria, and HIV, both at its site in Lima and at several field sites such as Iquitos, Cuzco, and La Merced. The institute is internationally recognized for the Gorgas Course in Clinical Tropical Medicine, given jointly with UAB.

The Instituto de Investigaciones de la Altura (High Altitude Research Institute) is known for its contribution to the understanding of high altitude physiology and the pathophysiology of acute and chronic high altitude sickness.

=== Logo ===
The logo of Cayetano Heredia is a yellow shield with the words "Spiritus ubi vult spirat" from the Gospel of John on the sides. In the center is the Rod of Asclepius, which is representative of medicine and healing.

== Rankings ==
University rankings

Global – Overall
- QS World: 1001–1200 (2025)
- THE World: 1001–1200 (2025)
- USNWR Global: 809 (2024)

Together with the National University of San Marcos and the Pontifical Catholic University of Peru, the Cayetano Heredia University is one of the only three Peruvian universities that has managed to rank first nationally in certain editions of different major international university rankings.

In 2022, when the results of the Biennial Report on Reality in Universities by SUNEDU came out, in the results of the historical ranking (1980-2021) and academic excellence (2019-2022), Cayetano Heredia University was ranked first in the country.

== Notable faculty ==
- Alberto Hurtado Abadia
- Honorio Delgado
- Carlos Vidal Layseca
- Enrique Fernández
- Javier Mariátegui
- Fabiola León-Velarde
- Uriel García Cáceres
- Dionicia Gamboa
- Patricia Sheen

== Notable alumni ==
- Patricia García Funegra
- Luis Pinillos Ashton
- Edward Málaga Trillo
- Raúl Patrucco Puig
- Fabiola León-Velarde
- Carlos Bustamante
- Ernesto Bustamante
- Ramiro Castro de la Mata
- Maria C. Freire
- Humberto Guerra Allison
- Tomas Kirchhausen
- Juan Mezzich
- Renato D. Alarcón
- Oswaldo Zegarra
- Abraham Vaisberg Wolach
- Ciro Maguiña
- Andrea Shows
- Gonzalo Castro de la Mata

== See also ==
- List of universities in Peru
- Cayetano Heredia
- Consortium of Universities
