= Chronic mountain sickness =

- Other names: Monge's disease
- Specialty: Emergency medicine

Chronic mountain sickness (CMS) is a disease in which the proportion of blood volume that is occupied by red blood cells increases (polycythaemia) and there is an abnormally low level of oxygen in the blood (hypoxemia). CMS typically develops after extended time living at high altitude (over 2,500 metres (8,200 ft)). It is most common amongst native populations of high altitude nations. The most frequent symptoms of CMS are headache, dizziness, tinnitus, breathlessness, palpitations, sleep disturbance, fatigue, loss of appetite, confusion, cyanosis, and dilation of veins.

CMS was first described in 1925 by Carlos Monge Medrano, a Peruvian doctor who specialised in diseases of high altitude. While acute mountain sickness is experienced shortly after ascent to high altitude, chronic mountain sickness may develop only after many years of living at high altitude. In medicine, high altitude is defined as over 2,500 metres (8,200 ft), but most cases of CMS occur at over 3,000 metres (9,800 ft).

It has recently been correlated with increased expression of the genes ANP32D and SENP1.

== Diagnosis ==
CMS is characterised by polycythaemia (with subsequent increased haematocrit) and hypoxaemia; raised blood pressure in the lungs (pulmonary hypertension) can develop over time and in some cases progress to heart failure (cor pulmonale). CMS is believed to arise because of an excessive production of red blood cells (erythrocytes) due to the low oxygen levels at altitude, which increases the oxygen carrying capacity of the blood. The increased levels of erythrocytes causes increased blood viscosity and uneven blood flow through the lungs (V/Q mismatch). However, CMS is also considered an adaptation of pulmonary and heart disease to life under chronic hypoxia at altitude.

Consensus for clinical diagnosis of CMS use laboratory values: haemoglobin in Males ≥ 21 g/dL; Females ≥ 19 g/dL, haematocrit > 65%, and arterial oxygen saturation (SaO2) < 85% in both sexes.

== Treatment ==
Migration to low altitude is curative, though not immediate, as the body adapts to the normal oxygen level near sea-level and the haematocrit normalises. Alternatively, bloodletting (phlebotomy) can be performed to lower the haematocrit temporarily; when combined with volume replacement with fluids this can have a longer effect.

Medication with acetazolamide, a carbonic anhydrase inhibitor, has been shown to improve chronic mountain sickness by reducing erythropoietin and the resulting polycythaemia, which results in better arterial oxygenation and a lower heart rate.

Oxygen therapy and training in slow breathing techniques has been shown to reduce symptoms through increasing blood oxygenation.

== Epidemiology ==
Although CMS generally affects people native to altitudes higher than 3,000 metres (9,800 ft), it does not affect populations around the world equally. A 2013 study reviewed CMS prevalence rates around the world and found the highest rates were found in Andean countries of South America and the lowest rates in people native to the East African Mountains of Ethiopia. CMS prevalence rates reported from the study are summarised below:

Location	People	Altitude	Prevalence rate
Ethiopia		3600–4100 m	0%
Tibetan Plateau	Tibetans		0.91–1.2%
Tibetan Plateau	Han Chinese		5.6%
Indian Himalayas		3000–4200 m	4–7%
Kyrgyzstan		3000–4200 m	4.6%
La Paz, Bolivia		3600 m	6–8%
Bolivia			8–10%
Cerro de Pasco, Peru		4300 m	14.8–18.2%
