= Oechsle (retail chain) =

Supermarket chain in Peru

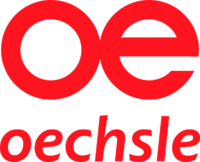
- Named after: Fernando Augusto Oechsle
- Formation: July 1888 (original); May 5, 2009; 17 years ago
- Founded at: Lima
- Defunct: 1993; 33 years ago
- Type: Supermarket chain
- Region served: Peru
- Owner: Tiendas Peruanas S.A.
- Website: www.oechsle.pe
- Formerly called: Casa Oechsle

Oechsle (pronounced [ˈøkslə]) is a Peruvian retail chain owned by Tiendas Peruanas S.A., a subsidiary of conglomerate Intercorp. Originally established as Casa Oechsle during the 19th century by A.F. Oechsle and best known for its Art Nouveau building at the Plaza Mayor, designed by French architect Claude Sahut. It closed in 1993 due to the economic crisis and internal conflict of the country, permanently reopening in 2009.

== History ==
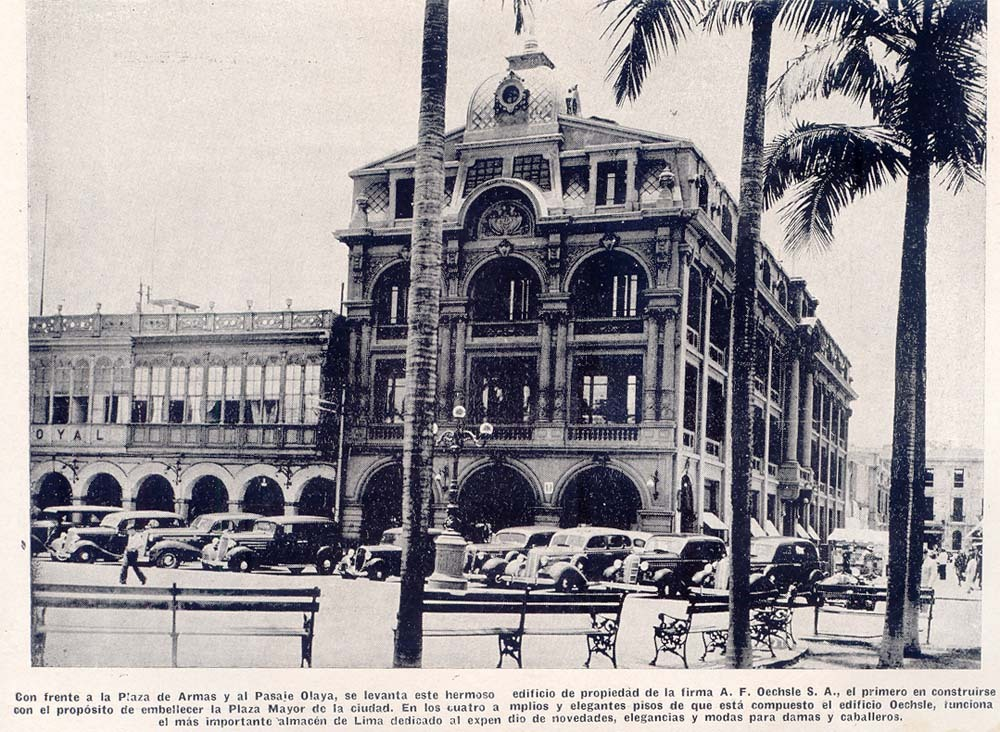
Former Oechsle building façade.

Casa Oechsle was the name under which the German immigrant Fernando Augusto Oechsle opened a small store in July 1888, initially dedicated to the sale of threads, lace and buttons imported from Europe. It replaced Harten y Cía. in 1896, founded by fellow German Juan Harten in 1888. The business expanded and gained a lot of prestige throughout the city as a result of an exclusive offer, made up of imported products, among which textiles, perfumes, decorative items and even toys stood out. It was in 1917 that Oechsle opened its most emblematic location located between the Portal de Botoneros and the José Olaya Passage in the Plaza Mayor of Lima, designed by Claude Sahut and inaugurated on December 1, 1920. After Oechsle's death in 1945, the business was inherited by his son, Alex Oechsle Pruss.

In the 1980s, Oechsle passed into the hands of Monterey, the most important supermarket chain in the Peruvian market at that time. The acquisition was made as a result of the family bond between the Oechsles and the Tschudis, owners of Monterey. However, as a result of the economic crisis that Peru experienced in the second half of the eighties and early nineties, to which was added terrorist violence, the chain had to declare bankruptcy and closed its doors in 1993. thus passing their establishments to new owners.

After several years, Intercorp bought the Oechsle brand and opened a chain of stores with that name as part of its diversification plan in the retail sector.

== See also ==
- Supermercados Monterey
