= Pasaje Santa Rosa =

Pedestrian street in Lima, Peru

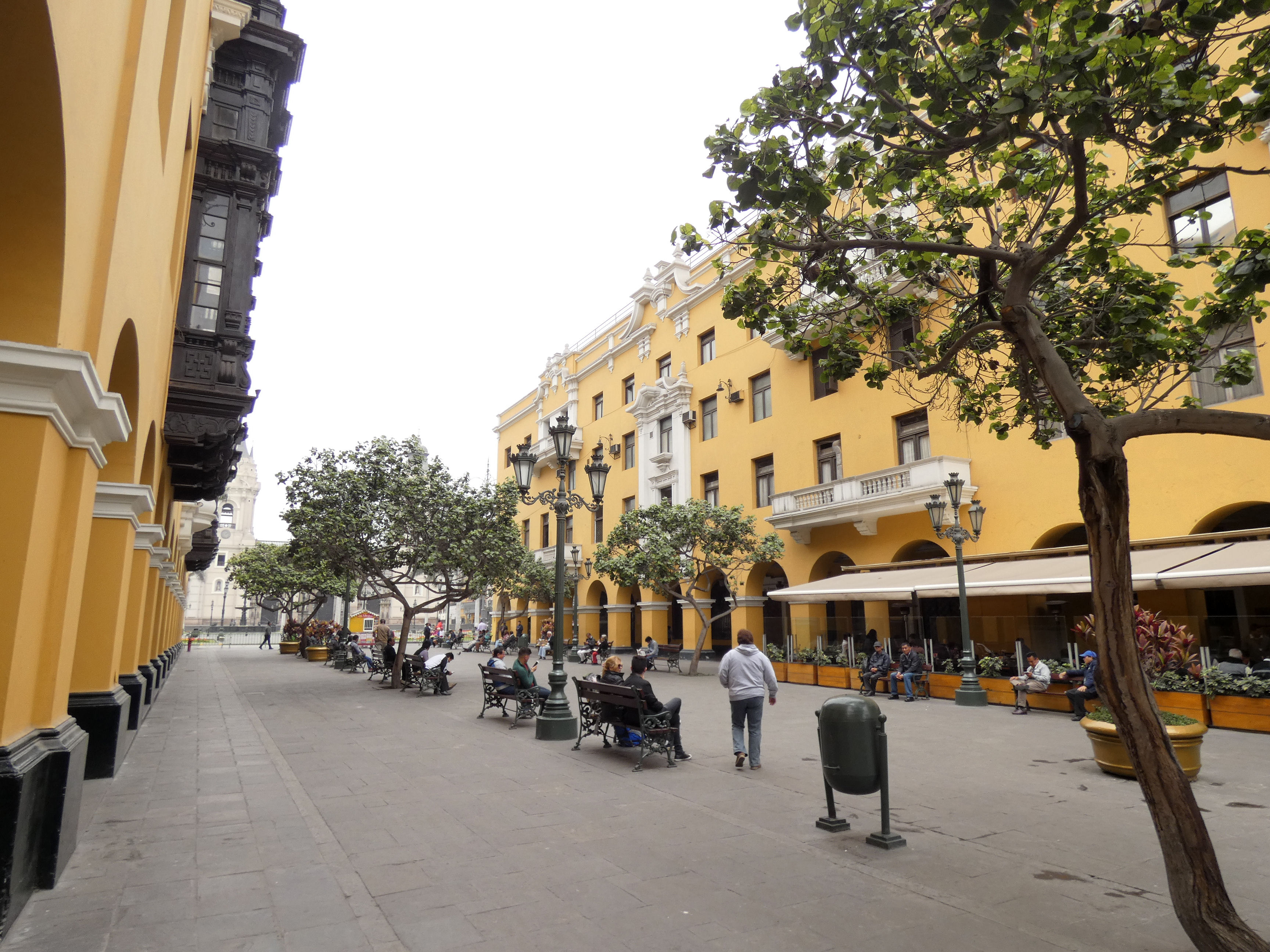
- Part of: Damero de Pizarro
- Namesake: Rose of Lima
- Length: 18 m (59 ft)
- From: Jirón de la Unión
- To: Jirón Camaná

Construction
- Completion: 20th century

Pasaje Santa Rosa is a pedestrian alleyway located in the Damero de Pizarro, next to the Plaza Mayor of Lima, Peru. Part of the city's historic centre, it separates the City Hall from the Club de la Unión, connecting Camaná and Union streets. It also connects with the Jirón Conde de Superunda through the Pasaje Nicolás de Ribera.

== History ==
The street was originally planned as the Saint Rose of Lima Avenue (Spanish: Avenida Santa Rosa de Lima) through a Supreme Resolution on April 28, 1944, under the presidency of Manuel Prado Ugarteche, with a width of 18 m (with one-metre sidewalks and 5-metre portals). Its planning took place in the context of the expansion works of the Municipal Palace, where the municipality acquired the land adjacent to it, and was projected on four blocks that would be expropriated to connect the Plaza Mayor with Tacna Avenue, the location of the Sanctuary of Saint Rose of Lima, which was also the focus of a project to build a basilica until its declaration as a National Monument on April 15, 1959.

The project was objected to by the Metropolitan Deliberative Board of Historic and Artistic Monuments (Spanish: Junta Deliberante Metropolitana de Monumentos Históricos y Artísticos) because it was considered that the project was not justified in its objective of solving traffic, it interrupted the unity of the city blocks, and affected historic buildings such as those of Fernando Barbieri and Francisco Bolognesi.

In 1985, Alfonso Barrantes, then mayor of Lima, inaugurated a monument dedicated to Taulichusco in the street.

In December 2024, the Municipality announced the move of the Equestrian statue of Francisco Pizarro from its location at the Parque de la Muralla to the pedestrian street as part of the 490th anniversary celebrations of the foundation of the city. During the early hours of January 15, 2025, it was moved and fixed to be inaugurated, with a new pedestal, on the 18th.

== See also ==
- Historic Centre of Lima
- Pasaje Olaya
