= Jirón de la Unión =

Street in Lima, Peru

Coordinates: 12.0499°S 77.0340°W

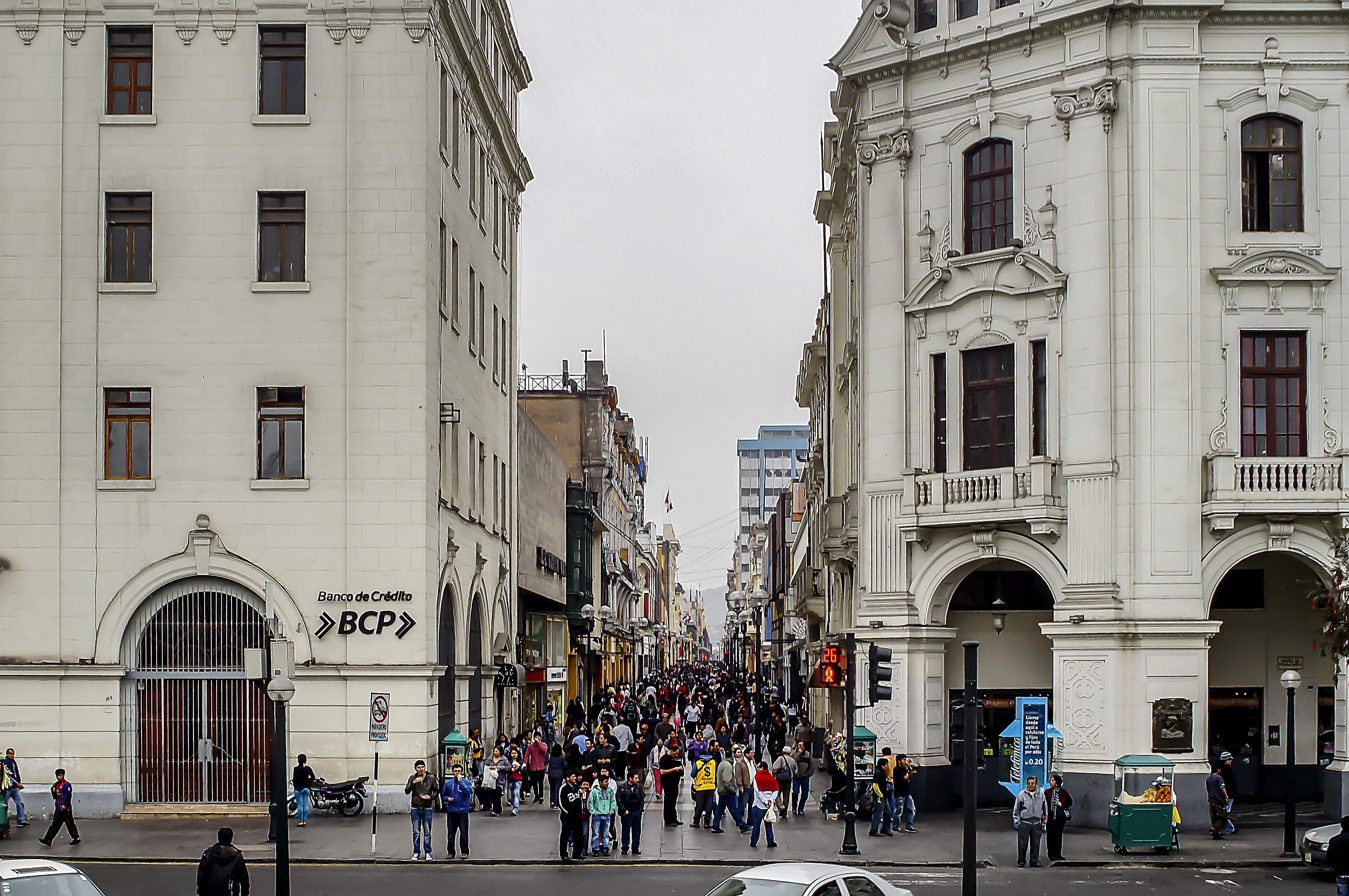
- View from San Martín Square
- Interactive map of Jirón de la Unión
- Part of: Damero de Pizarro
- Namesake: 1862 name reforms (Note: The street served as the divisional axis for the renaming project. See the relevant section.)
- From: Puente de Piedra
- Major junctions: Western side: Jirón Santa; Jirón Conde de Superunda; Jirón Callao; Jirón Ica; Jirón Huancavelica; Avenida Emancipación; Jirón Moquegua; Jirón Ocoña; Nicolás de Piérola Avenue; Jirón Quilca; Jirón Tambo de Belén; Uruguay Avenue; Bolivia Avenue; Eastern side: Jirón Áncash; Jirón Junín; Jirón Huallaga; Jirón Ucayali; Jirón Santa Rosa; Jirón Cuzco; Jirón Puno; Nicolás de Piérola Avenue; Jirón Pachitea; Franklin D. Roosevelt Avenue
- To: Paseo de la República Avenue

Construction
- Completion: 1535

Other
- Designer: Francisco Pizarro

Union Street (Spanish: Jirón de la Unión) is a major pedestrian street in the Damero de Pizarro, an area of the historic centre of Lima, Peru. The street starts at the Puente de Piedra, and continues until it reaches Paseo de la República Avenue. The road continues on the northern side of the Rímac River as Trujillo Street.

Union Street has traditionally served as the city's main axis since the Viceroyalty of Peru. Ater the War of Independence, it continued to function as a commercial centre, as well as a gathering point for the city's aristocratic upper class, who developed the custom of jironear. (Note: The term refers to the practice that existed during the first half of the 20th century of strolling through the street while well-dressed, visiting its establishments and meeting new people.) This reputation remained until the late 20th century, a turbulent period in the country's history that led to the city's mass expansion due to a continued migration of people from the country's interior.

== Name ==
The street's name comes from the project that was ultimately adopted in 1862, which replaced the city's traditional names with names that reflected the country's political geography. When the idea was put to paper, this street was used as a divisional axis for the new names, thus uniting them. Across the river, in Rímac District, Jirón Trujillo served the same purpose .

== History ==
The then-unnamed street was built by Francisco Pizarro in 1535, the same year Lima was founded. In 1862, the city adopted the naming project of Mariano Bolognesi, an idea first proposed by Manuel Atanasio Fuentes in 1857. Consequently, streets intersecting with the newly-named Union Street had two separate names, one for their west side and another for the east. In this sense, one jirón in reality was made up of a variety of different streets.

The first block of the street, traditionally named after the Church of Our Lady of the Forsaken or after the Puente de Piedra, was the location of the aforementioned church from its construction between 1669 and 1671, until its demolition in 1937. It was also the location of the Arco del Puente, which was burned down on April 10, 1879, by Chilean baker Cornelio Granados, five days after the War of the Pacific formally began between Chile and Peru.

The traditional Calle de Palacio (its current second block) was named in relation to the nearby bridge in 1613. When the city was founded, the two western terrains were granted to Francisco Martín de Alcántara and Jerónimo de Aliaga. The former's residence was demolished in 1952, while the latter's still stands. It also received the name of Calle del Hierro Viejo (or Calle del Fierro Viejo) due to the stores of such nature that once existed as part of the Palace's premises.

The traditional Calle de Portal de Escribanos (its current third block) was named after the offices of the public scribes during the Viceroyalty of Peru. During the mid-1940s, its middle section was demolished to make way for an avenue that would connect the Plaza Mayor with the Sanctuary of Saint Rose of Lima, which was ultimately cancelled.

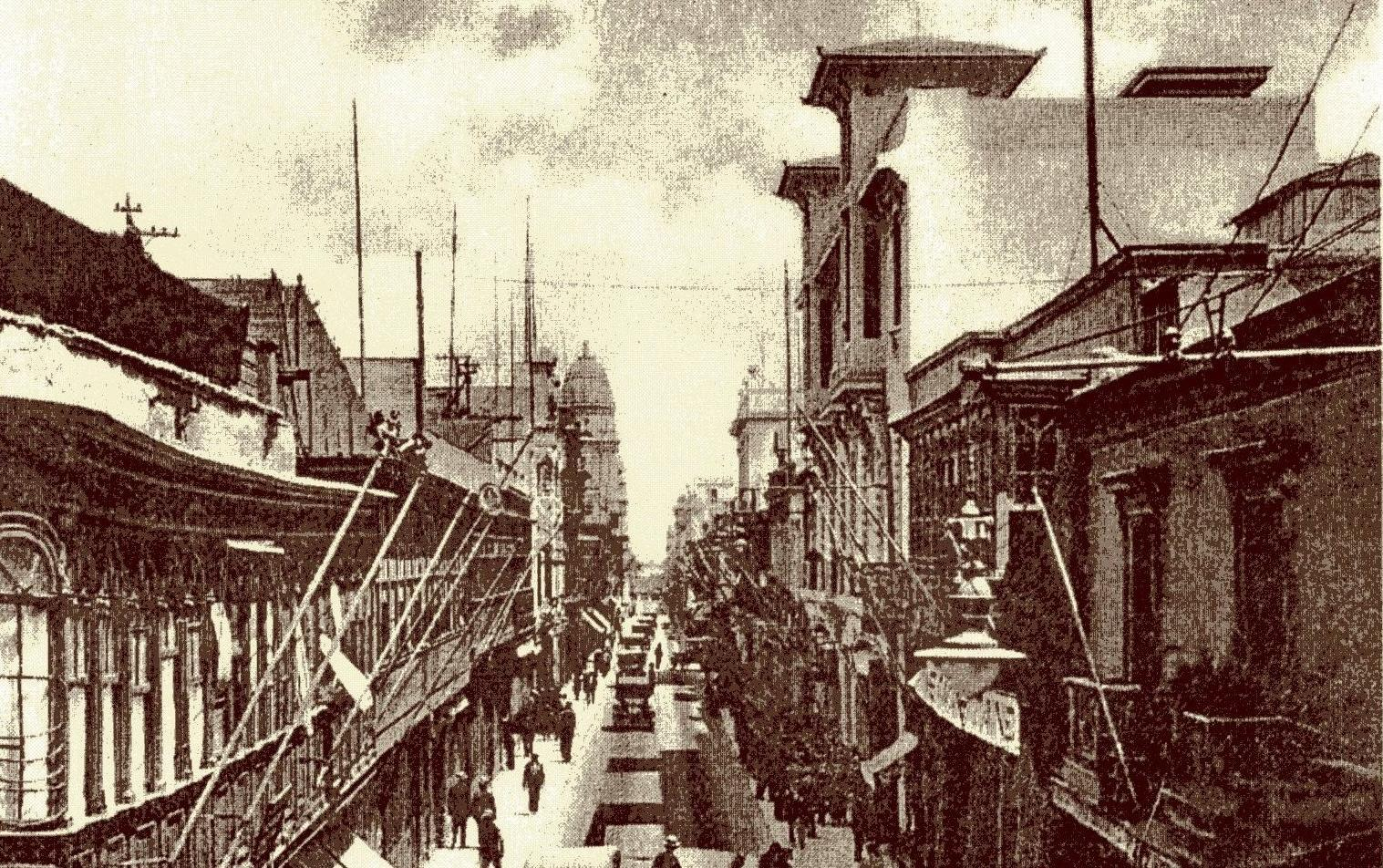
The Calle de Mercaderes in the 1930s.

The traditional Calle de Mercaderes (its current fourth block) was named for the stores opened there, notably of the textile type. It also housed the pharmacy of Pedro Bilbao in 1613, the same year a tribunal that regulated the stores' affairs was built on site. This establishment operated until 1877, and also gave the street the name of Calle del Consulado circa 1857. Notable residents include Nicolás de Ribera (El Viejo), who received a terrain at the corner with the Calle de Mantas, and Nicolás de Ribera (El Mozo), who received the terrain at the corner with the Portal de Botoneros. In the early 17th century, it also housed Leandro de la Rínaga Salazar, mayor of Lima in 1622.

The traditional Calle de Espaderos (its current fifth block) was already named as such by 1613, having acquired the name due to the number of stores selling edged and bladed weapons. Manuel Arredondo y Pelegrín, president of the Real Audiencia of Lima, resided here in a building that was gifted to Bernardo O'Higgins, where he died in 1842. The street's northwestern corner housed the Rodríguez de Carasas y Muñoz family, consisting of five sisters, of which one, Clara, married Juan José de Leuro y Carpfanger, after whom a neighbourhood in Miraflores is named.

The traditional Calle de la Merced (its current sixth block) is named after the church of the same name. It housed graduate Álvaro de Torres y del Castillo, as well as officer Francisco Severino. The latter's home was built over the terrain that belonged to Martín Pizarro, founder of the city and cousin of Francisco. The buildings were then acquired by the city, some of which were transferred to Pedro Sánchez de Paredes, who ceded them to the Tribunal of the Holy Office of the Inquisition. On May 29, 1909, a group affiliated with the Democratic Party met at the La Colmena Building, which then existed in front of the public square located there, to carry out coup attempt that ultimately failed. In 1942, the aforementioned building was acquired by the Banco Internacional del Perú, who built their headquarters there. In 1954, Casa Monterrey, the first supermarket chain in the country, opened its first store next to the bank.

The traditional Calle de Baquíjano (its current seventh block) was named after Maestre de campo Bernardo de Gurmendi at the end of the 18th century. The name was replaced by that of the Baquíjano family, whose arrival to the street after Gurmendi's death gave it its final name. Their house was purchased by Oidor Domingo Martínez de Aldunate, for 35 thousand pesos. Other inhabitants of this street were Gaspar Carrillo de Albornoz y Vega Cruzat, 5th Marquess of Feria and 3rd Marquess of Valdelirios, and his wife; Juan José de Avella Fuerte Sierra y Navia, Knight of the Order of Santiago and politician, who married Francisca de Querejazu y Santiago Concha, a daughter of the marquesses of Casa Concha.

The traditional Calle de Boza (its current eighth block) was named in 1613 by its path from the "Cross of San Diego towards La Merced". It was later named after the marquesses of Casa Boza, whose residence surrounded it. According to José Gálvez Barrenechea, it was also known as the Calle del Trono at one point. The street's corner with the Calle de Matajudíos served as the location of the residence of Francisco Tamayo de Mendoza y Navarra, marquess of Villahermosa, later residing his nephew and heir, as well as his brother. It then served as the residence of president Agustín Gamarra.

The traditional Calle de San Juan de Dios (its current ninth block) housed a public square of the same name, which was in turned named after a hospital, which was later turned into a train station. Revolutionary politician Bernardo de Monteagudo was assassinated on the adjacent Plazoleta de la Micheo, now part of the plaza, in 1825. Later, on July 26, 1872, Silvestre Gutiérrez, a participant of the coup d'état headed by his brother Tomás, was killed in a shootout at the station. In 1921, as part of the Centennial of the Independence of Peru, the station was razed and San Martin Square was built on the site.

The traditional Calle de Belén (its current tenth block) was named by 1613 after Paula Piraldo, widow of general Juan Andrade y Colmenero. Piraldo successfully requested a licence to open a street through an orchard in her property, also ceding other terrains for the construction of a religious building. In 1842, the terrain was sold to the nuns of the Church of the Sacred Hearts of Jesus and Mary, who established the Colegio de Belén. The street acquired a residential character by the 18th century, and a large property was purchased by Nuño de Espinola y Villavicencio, knight of the Order of Alcántara, which was later acquired by Agustín Carrillo de Córdoba y Agüero. In 1759, the building was acquired by Antonio de Boza y Garcés, mayor of Lima in 1786 and 1787.

The traditional Calle de Juan Simón (its current eleventh and final block) was named as one of the city' limits in 1613, also being known as the Calle de Ortiz after captain José Andrés Ortiz, who acquired an orchard there. An alleyway of the same name was located to its left side, today the first block of Bolivia Avenue. It was named after the owner of a plain located there.

=== Recent history ===
On May 5, 1976, mayor Arturo Cavero Calisto announced that the street would be restricted to pedestrian use. By March of the following year, vehicles were barred from the street and the street was set to be paved through five blocks, which did not happen. In 1978, the municipal order barring vehicular transit was annulled. The choice was taken up again by mayor Eduardo Orrego Villacorta, with construction works starting on August 1 of the following year. On November 20, 1982, the newly pedestrianised street was inaugurated.

During the 1980s, the Historic Centre of Lima underwent a period of decadence in which the economic recession and the increase in crime drove away visitors. At this time, the street was converted into a commercial emporium with a great quantity of abandoned store property and a large number of street sellers. It was not until the next decade until the reorganization of the historic centre took place at the orders of the mayor Alberto Andrade Carmona, which allowed the street to reactivate its economy.

Currently, the street has returned to being a commercial center; however, it has long lost its aristocratic character. The last change that has been made is the demolition of the concrete benches placed in the 1970s that were built with the intent to pedestrianise the road. These have been replaced with new benches inscribed with the coat of arms of each of the different departments of Peru.

== Route ==
The street begins at the bridge that passes over the Rímac River and is continued by Trujillo Street on the side of Rímac District. Next to the bridge are the excavations for the Molino de Aliaga, one of the first mills in the city.

The second block's eastern side hosts the side entrance of Government Palace, while its western side houses the Casa de Aliaga, which dates back to the 16th century, as well as the Pasaje Piura, a pedestrian alleyway that forms part of the Casa de Correos y Telégrafos, the city's traditional post office. Finally, its corner is the location of Peru Square, a public square with a fountain that once featured the Equestrian statue of Francisco Pizarro and, before that, the historic Casa Alcántara.

The third block hosts the buildings of the City Hall and the Union Club. Both are separated by the Pasaje Santa Rosa, and face the western side of the Plaza Mayor.

The fourth block's best known landmark is the Casa Courret. Designed by architect Enrique Ronderas, it housed the studio of photographer Eugène Courret until 1906, when he was succeeded by Adolphe Dubreuil. The studio was one of the most prolific of the late 19th and early 20th centuries, as the photographs taken there formed the archive that served as a graphic encyclopedia for the history of the city. The corner with Ica Street hosts the Casa Welsch, an Art Nouveau building named after the German retail company of the same name. Inaugurated on December 11, 1909, it was designed by Raymundo and Guido Masperi. In 1942, due to the anti-German sentiment caused by World War II, its Longines clock was replaced by an IBM one instead after the building was attacked. The store ultimately moved to San Isidro in 1991 and, as of 2025, hosts a Starbucks coffeehouse since 2013.

The fifth block hosts Saga Falabella, a department store, and the Casa O'Higgins, a museum operated by the Pontifical Catholic University of Peru dedicated to Bernardo O'Higgins, who lived his final years in exile there.

The sixth block houses the Basilica and Convent of Our Lady of Mercy. Its public square of the same name served as the location of one of José de San Martín's 1821 proclamations of the independence of Peru in Lima. Previously, he had done it in the city of Huaura and in the Plaza Mayor. Also located there are a monument to Ramón Castilla and a plaque that commemorates a protest of Fernando Belaúnde Terry against the National Jury of Elections, as well as the first headquarters of Interbank and another department store built as part of the Supermercados Monterey brand, later hosting La Quinta (until 2000), Saga Falabella (until 2020) and, as of 2025, a Marathon Sports store.

The seventh block begins with the Casa Barragán, a building inaugurated in 1913 that once housed the Palais Concert café, where intellectuals like Abraham Valdelomar once met. After an 8 million dollar investment by Ripley, it was reopened in 2012 to host its department store until June 2024. Further south are the former headquarters of La Prensa, a newspaper.

The ninth block borders the eastern side of San Martín Square and passes by the Gran Hotel Bolívar and a replica of Germain Pilon's monument containing the heart of Henry II of France, known as the Lamp of the Three Graces.

The tenth block begins at the corner where the Giacoletti Building is located, in front of which the Teatro Colón stands next to the National Club's headquarters. Further south are the Casa Belén, which houses the Andrés Del Castillo Museum of Minerals operated by the National University of San Marcos, the museum of the 10th Fireman's Company, and a number of traditional houses that have since been refurbished as restaurants and cultural centres.

The elevent and final block passes the former Colegio Sagrados Corazones Belén and ends at the Edificio Rímac, where Paseo de la República Avenue begins.

== Transportation ==
The street's first and third to ninth blocks are restricted to pedestrian use only, while access to its second block is restricted to government officials or invitees in the same capacity.

=== Bus service ===
Between its sixth and seventh blocks, a station of the Metropolitano operates surrounding the street's intersection with Avenida Emancipación and Cuzco Street since 2009, forming part of the bus service's Route C. Additionally, the service's Central Station is located under the Promenade of the Naval Heroes, which immediately follows the end of the avenue.

Since 2025, Jorge Chávez International Airport's AeroDirecto bus service operates its "Centro" route, which starts in front of the Gran Hotel Bolívar, and directly travels to the city's airport.

== See also ==
- Historic Centre of Lima
- Lima District
