= Walls of Lima =

17th-century fortification in Lima

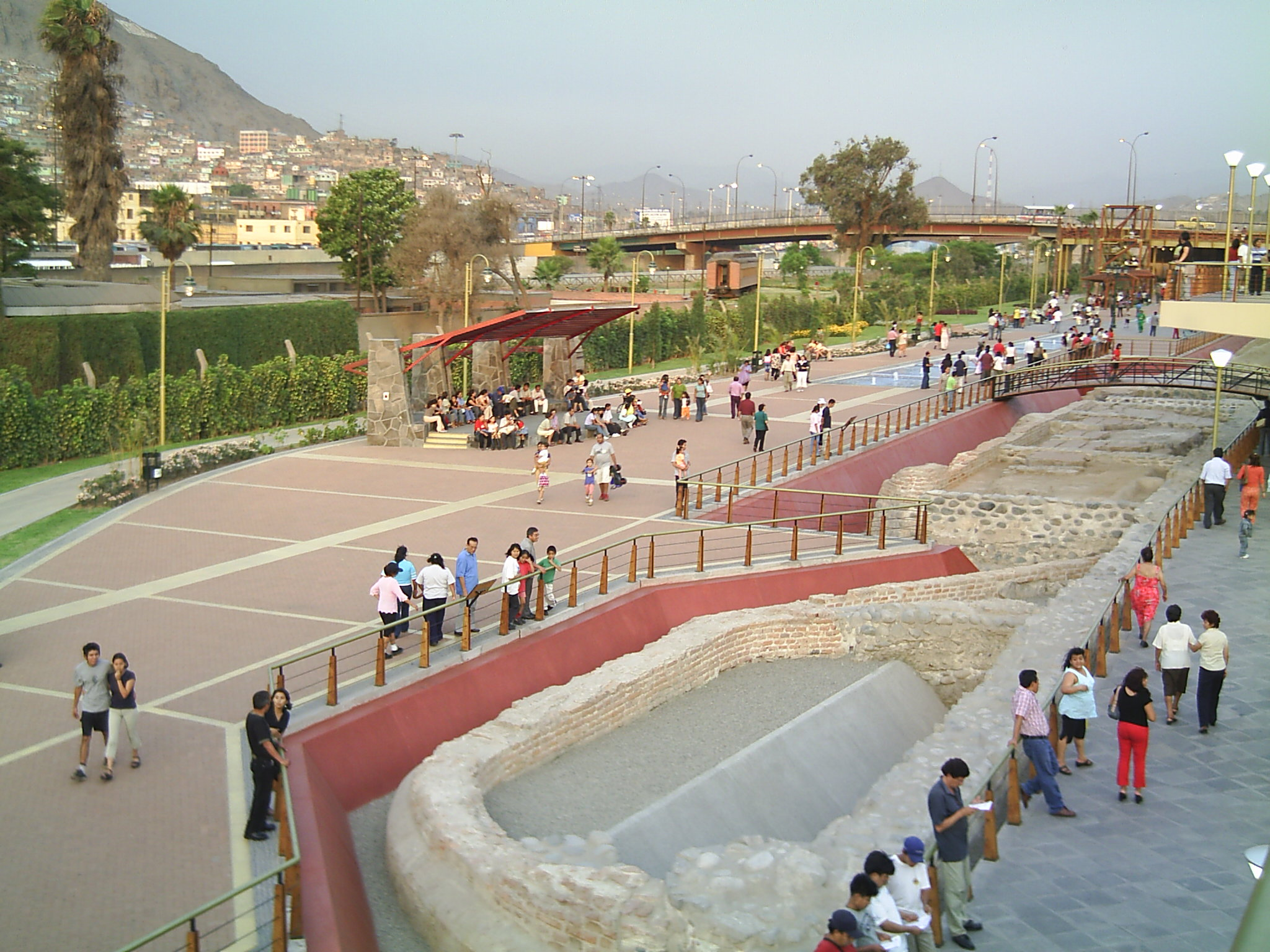
- Remains of the walls
- Interactive map of Walls of Lima
- 12°2′49.56″S 77°0′38.52″W
- Type: Fortification ruins
- Location: Lima, Peru

History
- Built: 1684–1687
- Original use: Protection against pirate attacks
- Demolished: 1871

The Walls of Lima were a fortification consisting mainly of walls and bastions whose purpose was to defend the city of Lima from exterior attacks. It was built between 1684 and 1687, during the Viceroy Melchor de Navarra y Rocafull (Duke of Palata)'s government.

The wall was located on the present streets of Alfonso Ugarte, Paseo Colón and Grau and the left bank of Rímac River. Under Luis Castaneda Lossio's management, he recovered a section of the remains of the left bank of the Rímac River, which are now visible as a part of the group known as "Parque de la Muralla," although these are probably from a previous construction known as "Tajamar de San Francisco." The Santa Lucía bastion is a sector of the wall located on the edge of Barrios Altos and El Agustino that still stands.

== History ==
Map of the City of the Kings in 1744 which was public in the work of Jorge Juan and Antonio de Ulloa.

The old wall was built around the city to protect it from pirates attacks and other enemies of the Spanish crown in the 17th century. The wall had 10 exit and entry gates: Martinete, Maravillas, Barbones, Cocharcas, Santa Catalina, Guadalupe, Juan Simón, San Jacinto, Callao, Monserrate and the gate of la Guía in the Barrio de San Lázaro.

As part of urban expansion programs and construction of new avenues, the wall was demolished in 1868 under José Balta's government. The wall never served the purpose for which it was built, to the point that Raúl Porras Barrenechea mentioned that "it died a virgin of gunpowder."

== Current status ==
Part of the sea wall has been restored at the back of the Church of San Francisco, near the Government Palace, which has created a public space named Parque de la Muralla (Park of the Wall). In this park, the remnants of the foundations that had been the seawall are visible, which was done by the Franciscans in 1610. The aforementioned park has a restaurant and a shop selling hand-made items from different areas of the country. The park contains a statue of Francisco Pizarro, which used to be in the "Plaza Pizarro," located next to the Government Palace. There is also a museum exhibiting archaeological pieces found in the area.

Construction of an expressway on Grau Avenue uncovered some of the wall's remains.

In Barrios Altos, the remains of the walls near the Plazuela del Cercado is in good condition. The camal de Conchucos, which was the bastion of Santa Lucía, one of the surveillance points of the wall, is now a sports complex.

The wall was not a paragon of beauty. Except for the portals of Maravillas (1807) in the Barrios Altos and El Callao, the other gates, as told by the painter Juan Manuel Ugarte, "had no great artistic appeal. It is one of the most important tourist attractions, besides the houses, among others.

Gallery
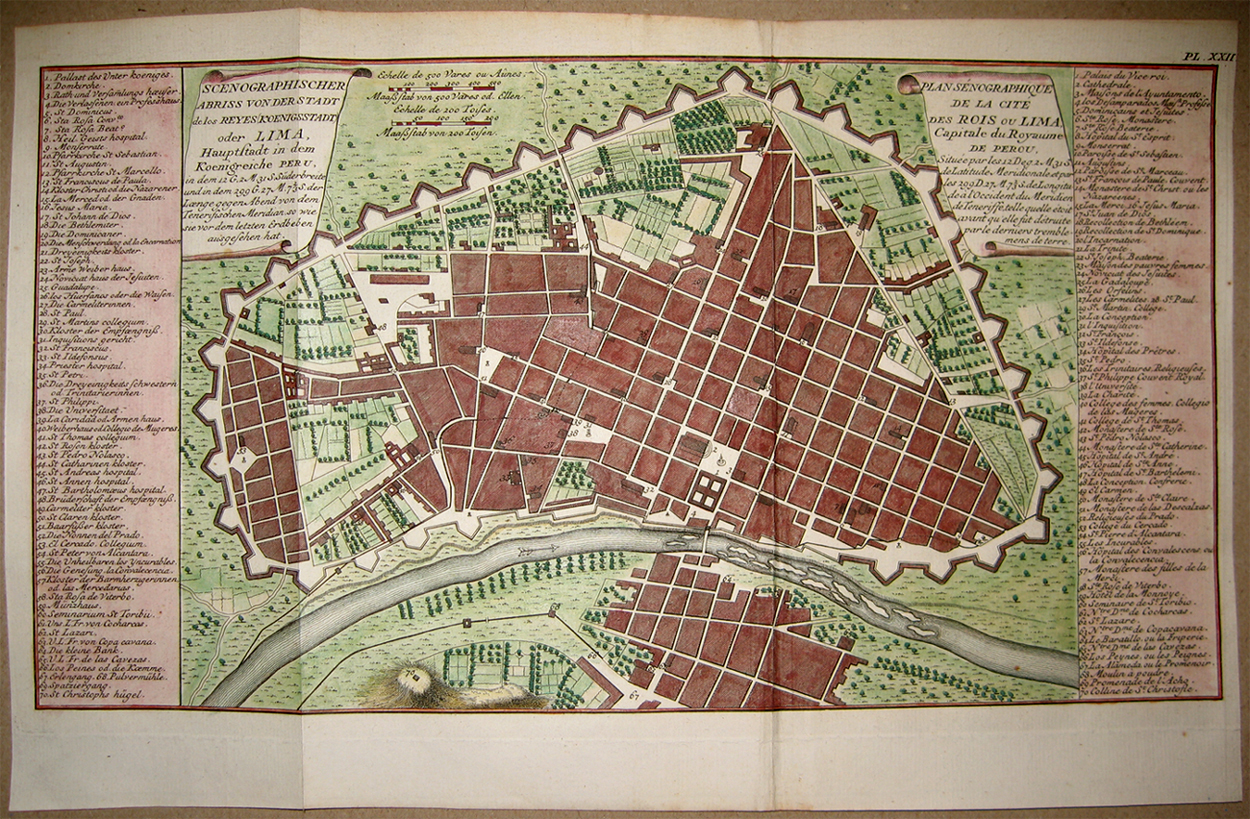
The walls of Lima in a plan of 1750

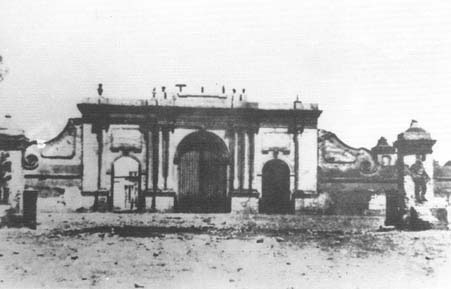
Aspect of the Gate of Callao, located in the Ovalo de la Reina, in 1870

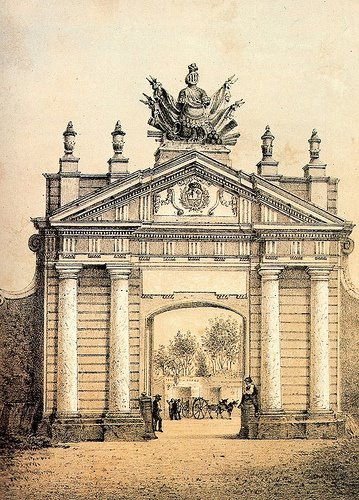
Gate of Maravillas, which gave access to the fortified Lima

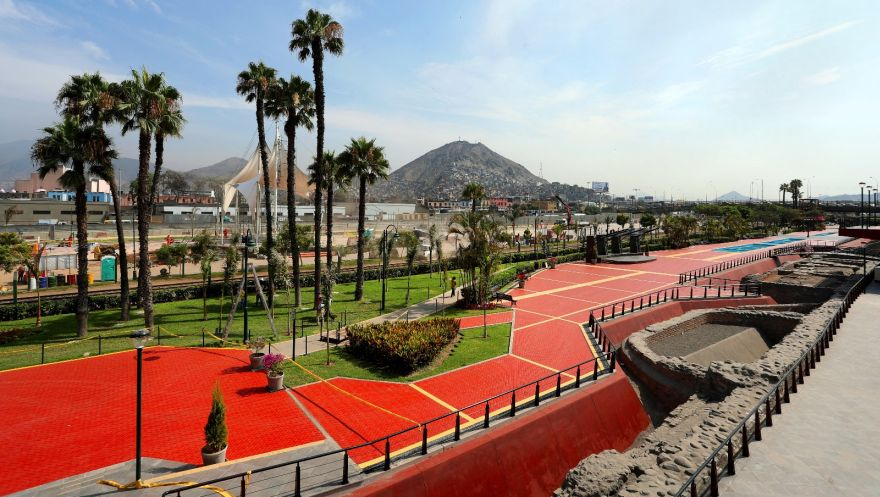
Muralla, Casco Antiguo de Lima

== See also ==
- Wall of Trujillo
- Defensive wall

== Bibliography ==
- Hanke, Lewis (1980). Los virreyes españoles durante la casa de Austria (in Spanish). Vol. VII. Madrid: Ediciones Atlas.
- Basadre, Jorge (1983). Historia de la República del Perú (in Spanish). Vol. V (7th ed.). Lima: Editorial Universitaria.
