= Casa Alcántara =

Former building in Lima, Peru

Coordinates: 12°02′42″S 77°01′51″W

- Solar de Alcántara
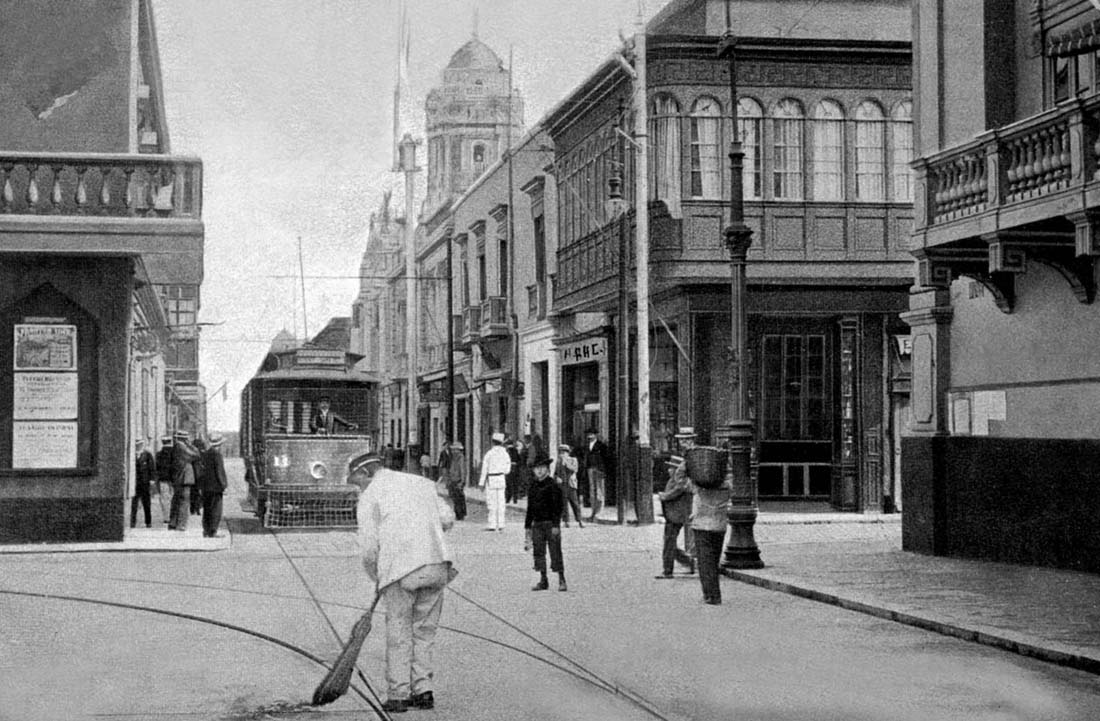
- Interactive map of the Casa Alcántara area

General information
- Architectural style: Spanish Colonial
- Location: Historic Centre of Lima
- Completed: 16th century
- Demolished: 1952
- Owner: Francisco M. de Alcántara

The Casa de Alcántara was a 16th-century building in the Historic Centre of Lima. It was demolished in 1952 and replaced by the Plaza Pizarro.

== History ==
The primitive building dates back to the beginning of the founding of the city. It belonged to Francisco Martín de Alcántara, maternal brother of Francisco Pizarro, from whom the house took its name. After his death, the property passed to his wife, Inés Muñoz de Ribera, who later, after her death, bequeathed it to the Monastery and Convent of the Clean and Purísima Concepción, later around the year 1950 the property was purchased by the state.

After the building was demolished in 1952, the Plaza Pizarro replaced it. The plaza took its name from the equestrian statue of the Conquistador that was moved from its original location in front of the Cathedral of Lima.

== See also ==
- Plaza Mayor, Lima
