= Olaya =

Olaya may refer to:

== People ==
- Andrea Olaya (born 1994), Colombian freestyle wrestler
- Eloy Olaya (born 1964), Spanish football forward
- Enrique Olaya Herrera (1880–1937), Colombian journalist and politician, President of Colombia
- José Olaya (1789–1823), Afro-Peruvian hero in the Peruvian War of Independence
- Olaya Pérez Pazo (born 1983), Venezuelan beach volleyball player

== Places ==
- Olaya, Antioquia, a municipality in the department of Antioquia, Colombia
- Olaya (Riyadh), a modern commercial area in northern Riyadh, Saudi Arabia
- Pasaje Olaya, a street in Lima, Peru

== Other uses ==
- Olaya (TransMilenio), a bus rapid transit station in Bogotá, Colombia
- Olaya (ship), a tanker ship that served in the Royal Canadian Navy as HMCS Provider and the Peruvian Navy as Organos
