= Olaiya =

Olaiya may refer to:

== People ==
- Moji Olaiya (1975–2017), Nigerian actress
- Moses Olaiya (1936–2018), Nigerian dramatist, comedian and actor
- Victor Olaiya (1930–2020), Nigerian trumpeter

== Other uses ==
- Olaiya House, a Brazilian-style building on Lagos Island, Nigeria

== See also ==
- Olaya (disambiguation)
