= Taulichusco =

Incan Kuraka and final cacique of Lima

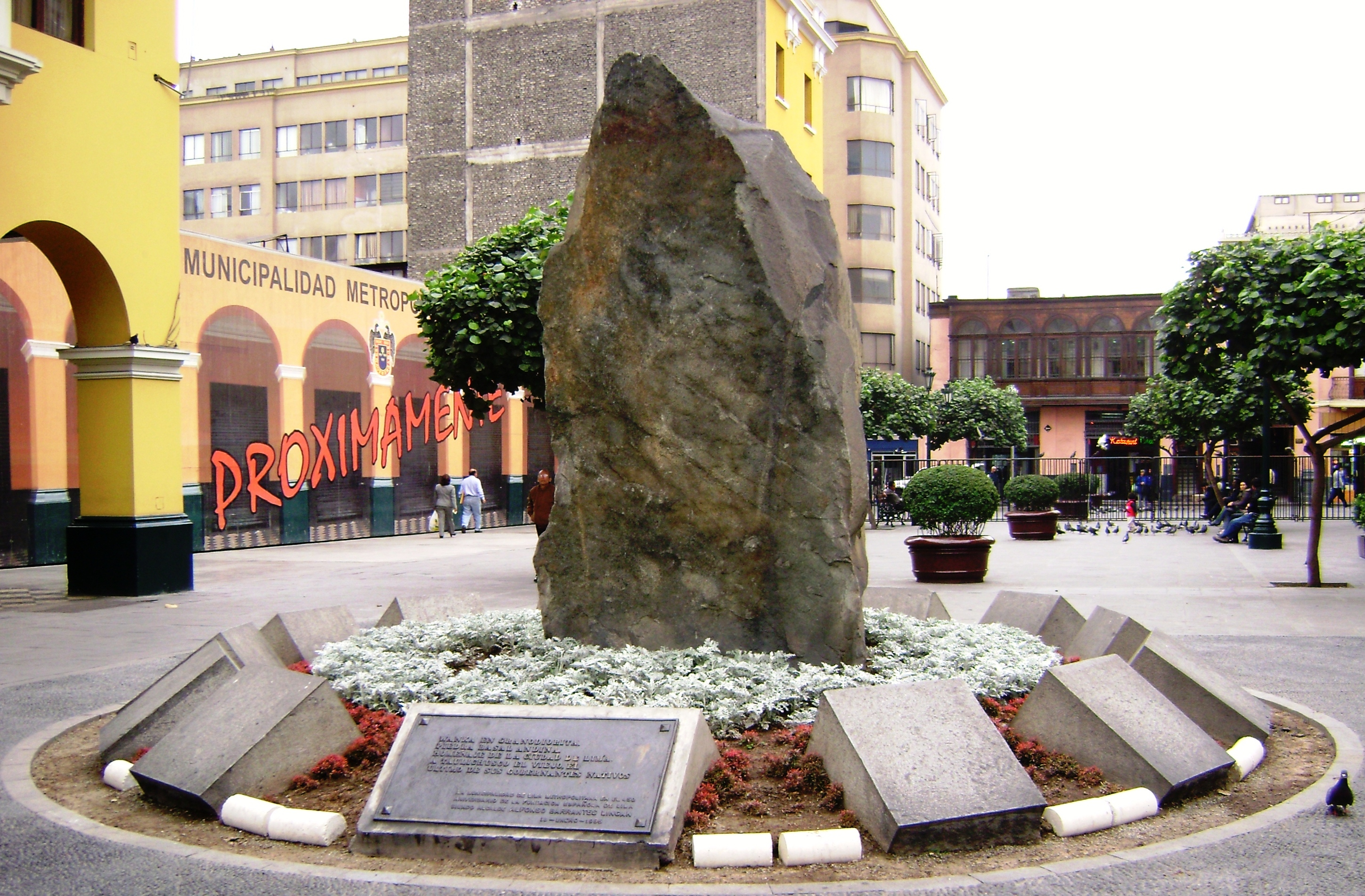
- Monument at the Pasaje Santa Rosa
- Born: 15th century Inca Empire
- Died: between 1562 and 1576; Bendita Magdalena de Chacalea, Lima, Peru, Spanish Empire
- Occupation: Kuraka of Rímac Valley

Taulichusco, also called the Elder (Spanish: El Viejo), was an Incan kuraka who administered part of the Rímac Valley in the mid-16th century. The Stone of Taulichusco (Spanish: Piedra de Taulichusco) monument in his memory lies at the Pasaje Santa Rosa, next to the Plaza Mayor.

== Biography ==
Little is known about his origins and history before the arrival of the Spanish to its curacazgo. According to indigenous testimonies collected by the viceregal authorities, Taulichusco was "Yanakuna and servant of Mama Vilo, wife of Huayna Cápac." He was an authority imposed by the Incas of Cuzco in the valley.

His name, derived from Quechua, is translated as "four peoples" or "partialities" (Spanish: cuatro pueblos / parcialidades). The historian Carlos Romero asserts that the correct spelling of his name would be Tauri-Chusca.

His domain extended across part of the fertile valley of the Rímac River, a place full of orchards and fruit trees. He commanded an army of 3,000 soldiers. His residence was located on the site where the Casa de Pizarro was later built, the current headquarters of the Peruvian government, a strategic place because it was a control node for the irrigation ditches that distributed water to the orchards in the valley.

He was, along with his brother Caxa Paxa, the last indigenous ruler of the area that would later become the City of Kings. His position disappeared with the conquest of Peru at the hands of the Spanish conquistador Francisco Pizarro and his hosts. He did not resist the Spanish and received them with hospitality, offering them gifts and food, he even collaborated with them. At that time, due to his advanced age, he co-governed the territory with his son Guachinamo. His collaboration is presumed as a form of tactical alliance with the Spanish, who had overthrown the Inca power of the central Peruvian coast.

His curacazgo was denatured, the land was used for the construction of the new city, and its inhabitants reduced to encomiendas. He went into exile in the town of Chuntay (later the parish of San Sebastián) and then in Bendita Magdalena de Chacalea (later the historic centre of Magdalena Vieja), where he died between 1562 and 1576. His grandson, Gonzalo Taulichusco, was chief of the Indian doctrine of Santa María Magdalena, the seed of Pueblo Libre district, where the inhabitants of what were the domains of Taulichusco the Elder were gathered.

== Legacy ==
In 1985, Alfonso Barrantes, then mayor of Lima, inaugurated a monument in his memory in the Pasaje Santa Rosa of the Cercado de Lima. The monument consists of a wanka, a 14-ton Andean ceremonial stone collected in the Amancaes pampa.

That same year, Milner Cajahuaringa, a painter from Huarochirí, painted a portrait of him in a figurative style.

== See also ==
- History of Lima
