= Casa de Aliaga =

Building in Lima, Peru

Coordinates: 12.0444°S 77.0303°W

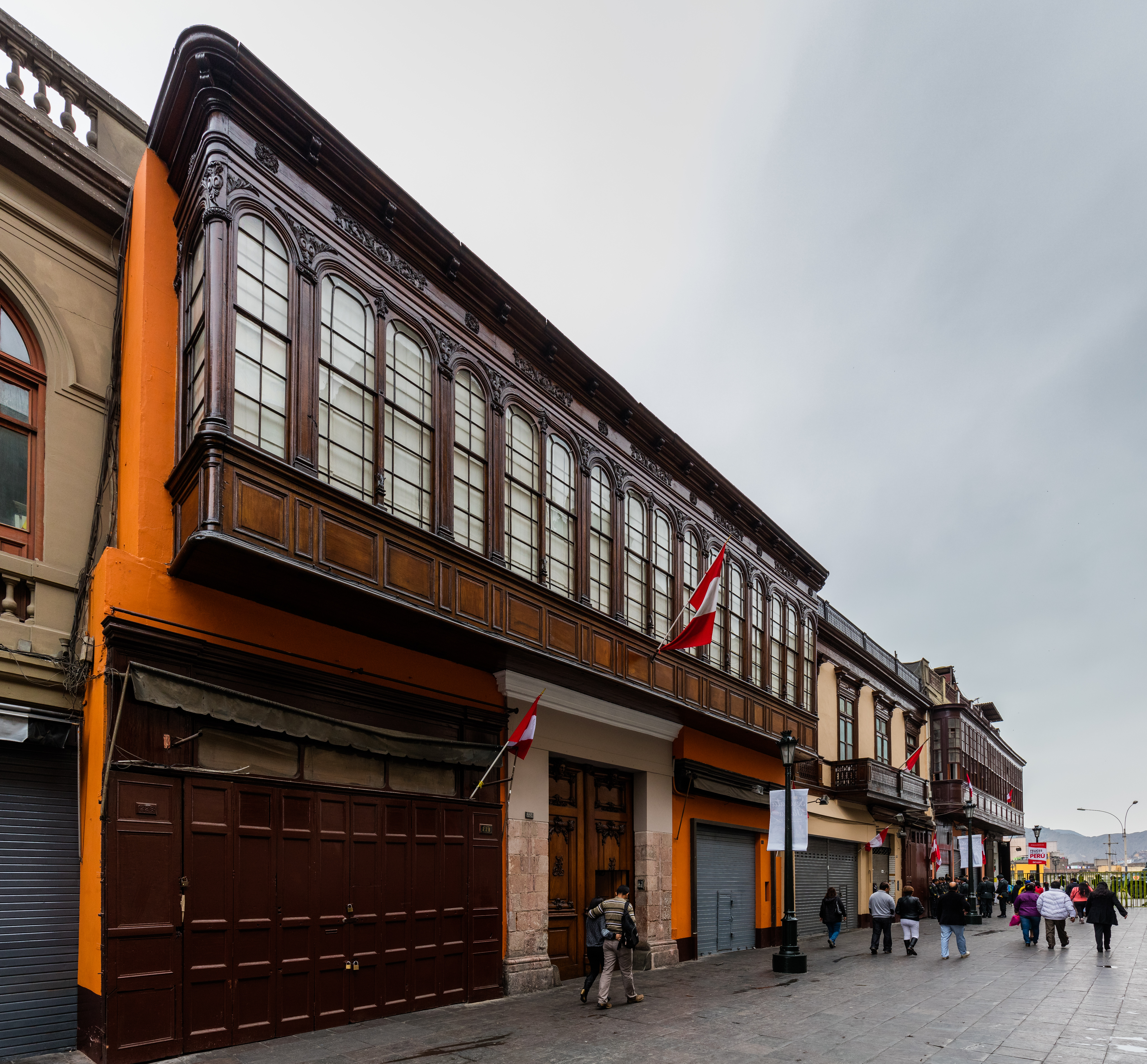
- Interactive map of the Casa de Aliaga area

General information
- Architectural style: Spanish Colonial
- Location: Historic Centre of Lima, Jirón de la Unión 225
- Owner: Gonzalo Jorge de Aliaga

The Casa de Aliaga is a colonial-style building located in the historic centre of Lima, Peru. It was built on a huaca, dating back to May 1536, at the beginning of the founding of the city, and belonged to Conquistador Geronimo de Aliaga. Its current owner is Gonzalo Jorge de Aliaga Ascenzo, VIII Count of San Juan de Lurigancho. It has been continuously inhabited by the same family for seventeen generations over a period of five centuries.

== History ==
In 1746, it was destroyed by the 1746 Lima–Callao earthquake and rebuilt by Juan José Aliaga y Sotomayor. In the 19th century a series of works were carried out.

The original construction was made of quincha and adobe. The architecture is eclectic in style due to several changes made since its construction. The styles present are Renaissance, Mannerist, Baroque or Neoclassical. It has 18 rooms and real estate from the time.

The house is part of the city's historic centre, which was declared a World Heritage Site in 1991, having already been declared part of the Cultural heritage of the Nation in 1972.

== See also ==
- Historic Centre of Lima
