= Club de la Unión =

Civil association in Lima, Peru

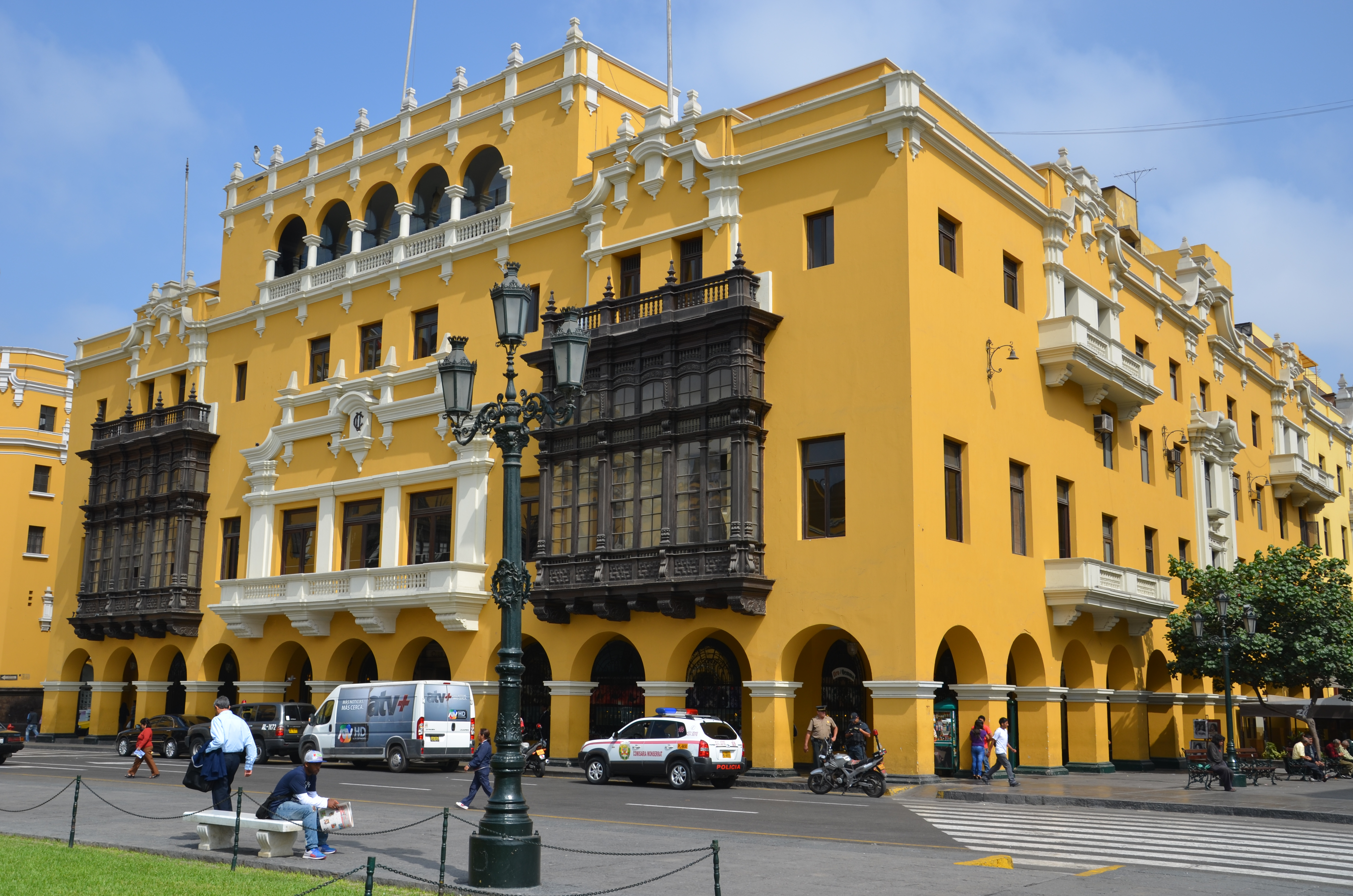
- The balconied building next to the Plaza Mayor
- Founded: October 10, 1868
- Headquarters: Palacio de la Unión
- Location: Jirón de la Unión 364, Lima
- Website: clubdelaunion.com.pe

The Club de la Unión is a private club and civil association headquartered at the Plaza Mayor of Lima, Peru. Founded on October 10, 1868, its founders include notable historical figures who would be later killed in action during the War of the Pacific, such as Miguel Grau, Alfonso Ugarte, and Francisco Bolognesi. In addition to its headquarters in Lima District, an additional facility in Santa Rosa District also serves as a sports complex.

== History ==
The club was established on October 10, 1868.

== Organisation ==
The Palacio de la Unión, located at the intersection of Union and Carabaya streets, serves as the club's headquarters. The plot where the building was constructed was donated by the government to compensate their acquisition of the original terrain donated to the club in 1936 by philanthropist Víctor Larco Herrera to build the Municipal Palace. As part of the Historic Centre of Lima, it has been designated as a National Monument since 1972.

The multi-purpose building houses the Terraza Lima Club bar at its former Salón Azulejos, located on the building's fifth floor.

== See also ==
- Historic Centre of Lima
- Plaza Mayor, Lima
