= Archbishop's Palace, Lima =

Palace in Lima, Peru

Coordinates: 12.0462°S 77.0296°W

Archbishop’s Palace of Lima
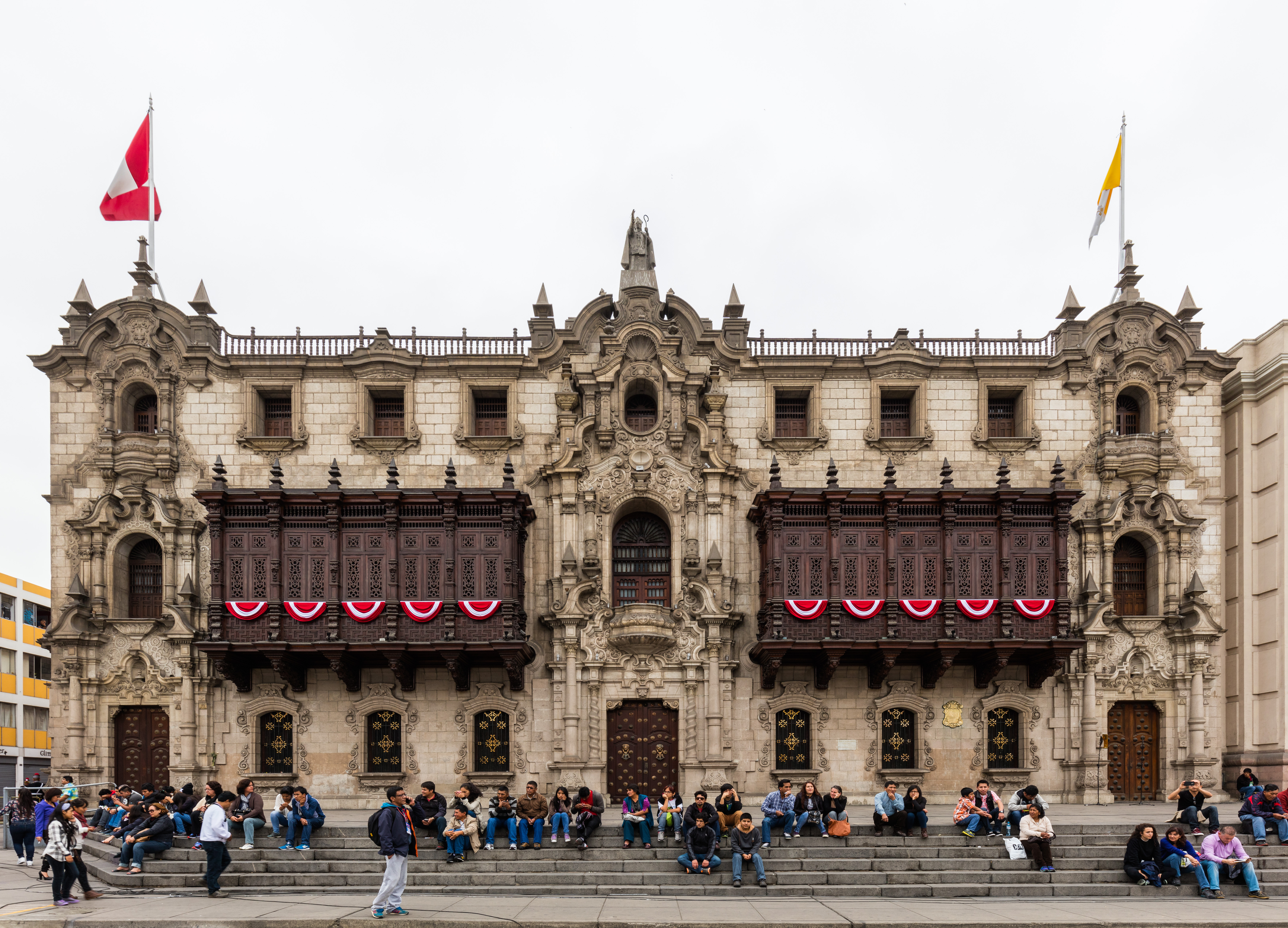

General information
- Location: Lima, Peru
- Completed: 1924

Design and construction
- Architect: Ricardo de Jaxa Malachowski

The Archbishop’s Palace of Lima, the capital of Peru, is the residence of the Archbishop of Lima, and the administrative headquarters of the Archdiocese of Lima. It is located at the Plaza Mayor, in the Historic Centre of Lima.

== History ==
Located on land that Francisco Pizarro allocated as the residence of the head priest of Lima after the foundation of the city in 1535, the current building was opened on December 8, 1924, and is considered a prime example of Spanish Colonial Revival architecture that developed in Lima and in many places in Latin America during the early twentieth century.

The old Archbishop’s Palace was built on the place the Cabildo of Lima had occupied from 1535 to 1548, when that institution moved to its current location across the square. The building had six balconies of different styles and several entrances, displaying the Archdiocese's coat of arms above the main gate. The architectural features of the courtyard were similar to those of several cloisters in the city. The old palace façade was demolished in the late 19th century along the Sagrario. The remaining structure was demolished prior to the construction of the present Archbishop’s palace.

The current building was designed by the Polish Peruvian architect Ricardo de Jaxa Malachowski, who used the Torre Tagle Palace as a reference point. Adjacent to the Cathedral of Lima, the location formerly belonged to the city’s first police station and the city’s first jail. After Pope Paul III designated this temple as the primary church headquarters of the city, the location became the current location of the Archdiocese.

The façade is made up of baroque elements, completely made of reintegrated rock; ornate cedar balconies are located over the main doors, and the palace is finished by a granite sculpture of Saint Turibius of Mongrovejo, the patron protector of the Archdiocese. The palace also features two flagpoles, one for the Peruvian flag and another for the flag of the Vatican. The interior is highly decorated and is home to a sculpture of Santa Barbara, the patron of Cuba. The ceiling is illuminated by famous French stained glass windows. The interior also contains marble staircases with wooden handrails that allow access to the second story.

== See also ==
- Balconies of Lima
- Holy See–Peru relations
