= Supermercados Monterey =

Supermarket chain in Peru

- Logo by Studio A, 1980-1993
- Founded: 1954; 72 years ago
- Defunct: 1993; 33 years ago
- Type: Supermarket chain
- Region served: Peru
- Formerly called: Casa Monterrey

Supermercados Monterey, originally written Monterrey, was a Peruvian supermarket chain created in 1954, in Lima. It also operated in Arequipa, Trujillo, Chiclayo, Cuzco, Piura, Sullana and Talara until its closure in 1993 due to the economic crisis and internal conflict of the country.

== History ==
The company was founded in 1954 as Casa Monterrey by Swiss businessman Bruno Tschudi and the Benavides family, current owners of Compañía de Minas Buenaventura, opening its first store in the 54th block of the Jirón de la Unión. It opened up to sixteen stores in the city, in the districts of Miraflores, San Isidro, Surco and the Cercado. The spelling of its name was changed in February 1980 due to a legal battle, as it was identical to that of a retailer in Arequipa.

It was sold to the Lau family in 1991, closing in the early months of 1993 due to the economic crisis of the time.

== See also ==
- Supermercados Peruanos
