= Plaza Perú (Lima) =

Cultural heritage site in Peru

Coordinates: 12°02′42″S 77°01′51″W

Peru Square
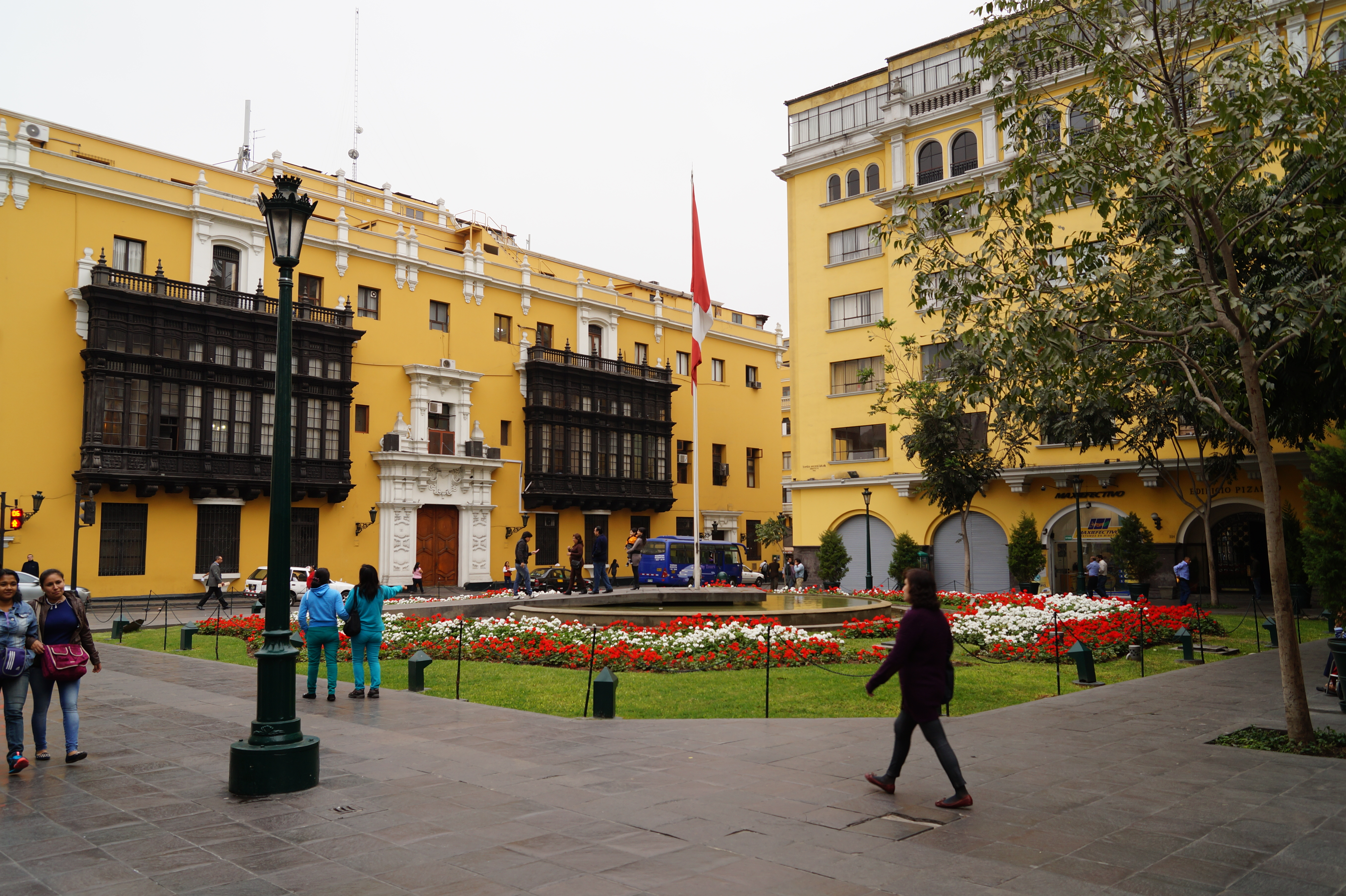

- Location within Lima
- Location: Lima, Peru

History
- Built: 1952

UNESCO World Heritage Site
- Type: Non-movable
- Criteria: Monument
- Designated: 1991
- Part of: Historic Centre of Lima
- Reference no.: 500

Peru Square, formerly known as Francisco Pizarro Square, is a public square located in central Lima, Peru.

== History ==
The square is located in a corner of the Plaza Mayor, on the side between the Government Palace and the Municipal Palace, where the Casa Alcántara was formerly located, which was demolished in 1952, during the administration of then Mayor of Lima, Eduardo Dibós, to inaugurate, on July 26 of that year, Francisco Pizarro Square.

The square was so named because it was the place where it was decided to move, from the city's cathedral, the controversial equestrian statue of Francisco Pizarro, by Charles Rumsey. This statue was removed by the municipal government of Luis Castañeda, in 2003, and relocated to the Parque de La Muralla. After that, the square was remodeled, a pool and the national flag were placed in the center, and it was renamed to Peru Plaza.

== Gallery ==
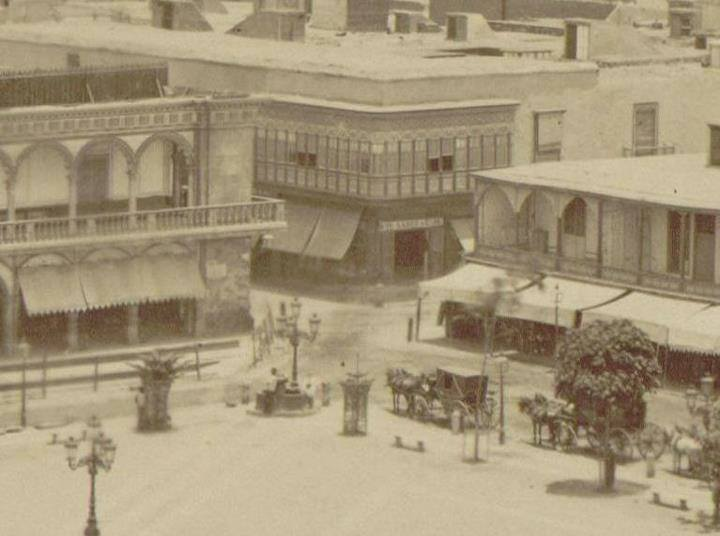
The former Colonial building

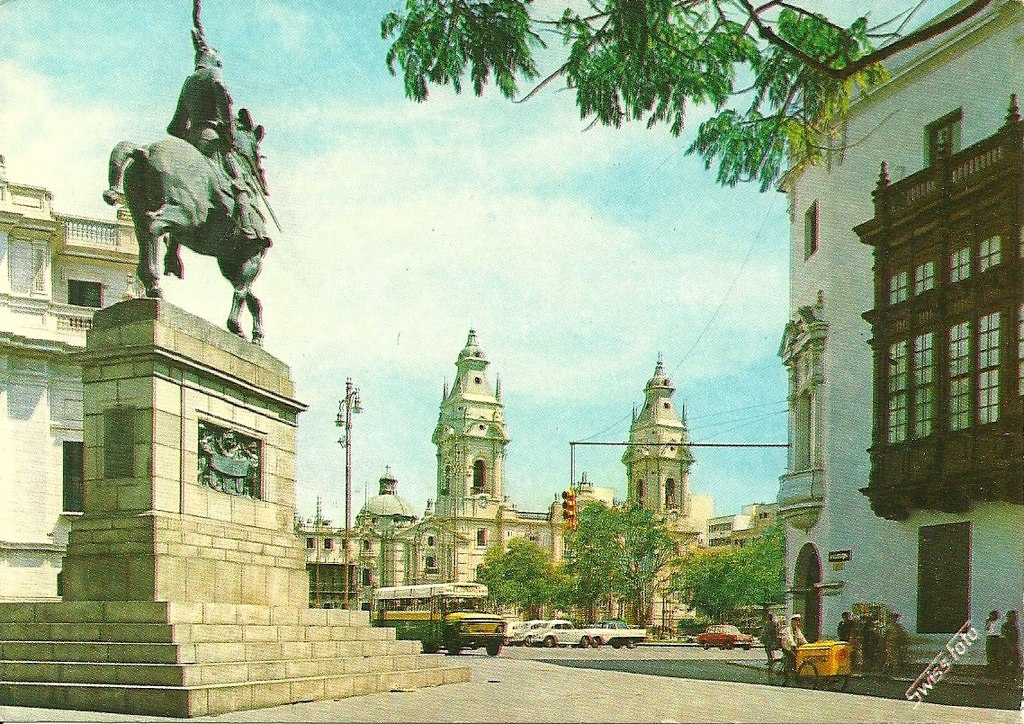
The square in 1987

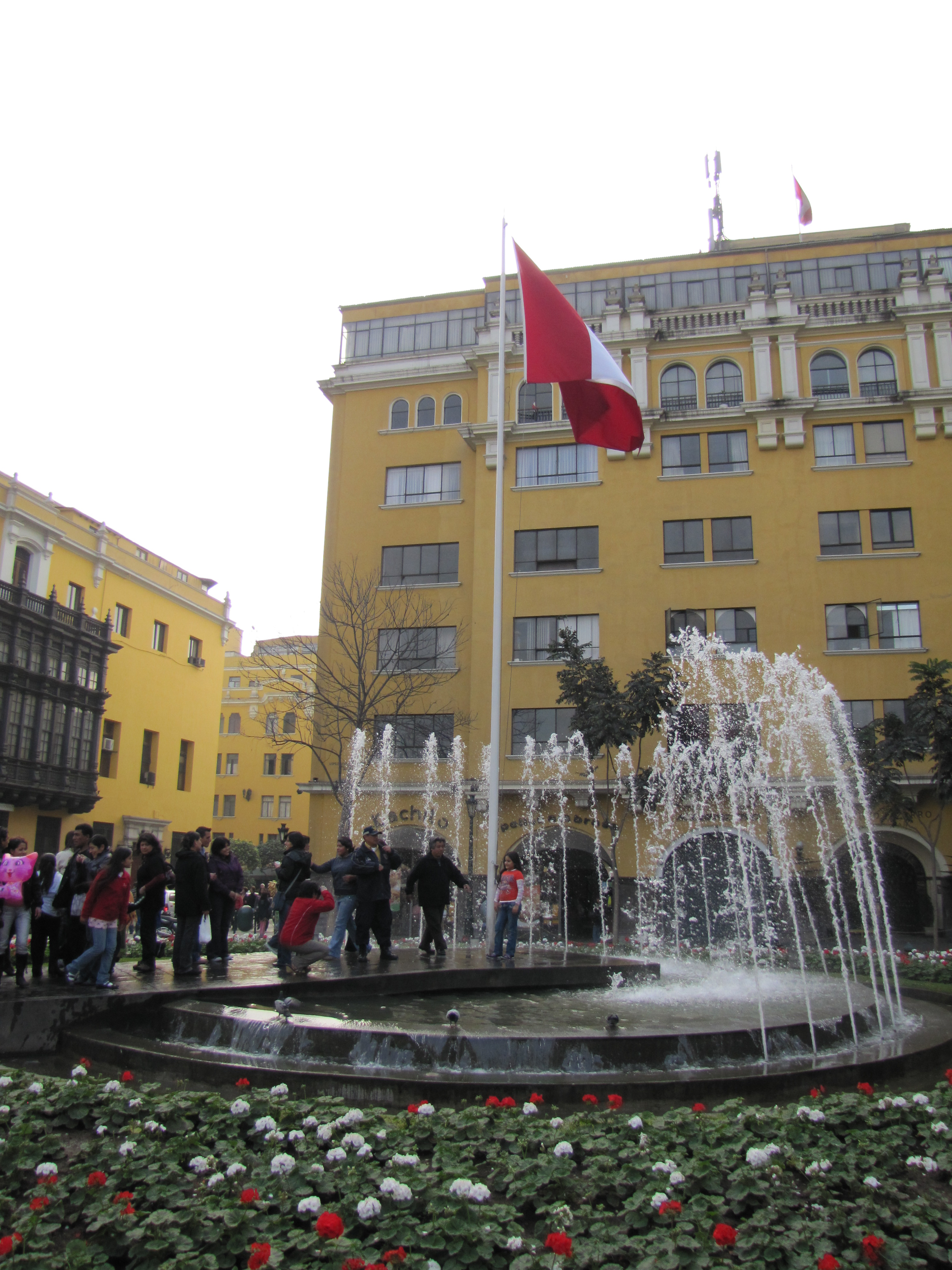
The flag and fountain

== See also ==
- Plaza Mayor, Lima
