= José Olaya =

Peruvian independence fighter (1789–1823)

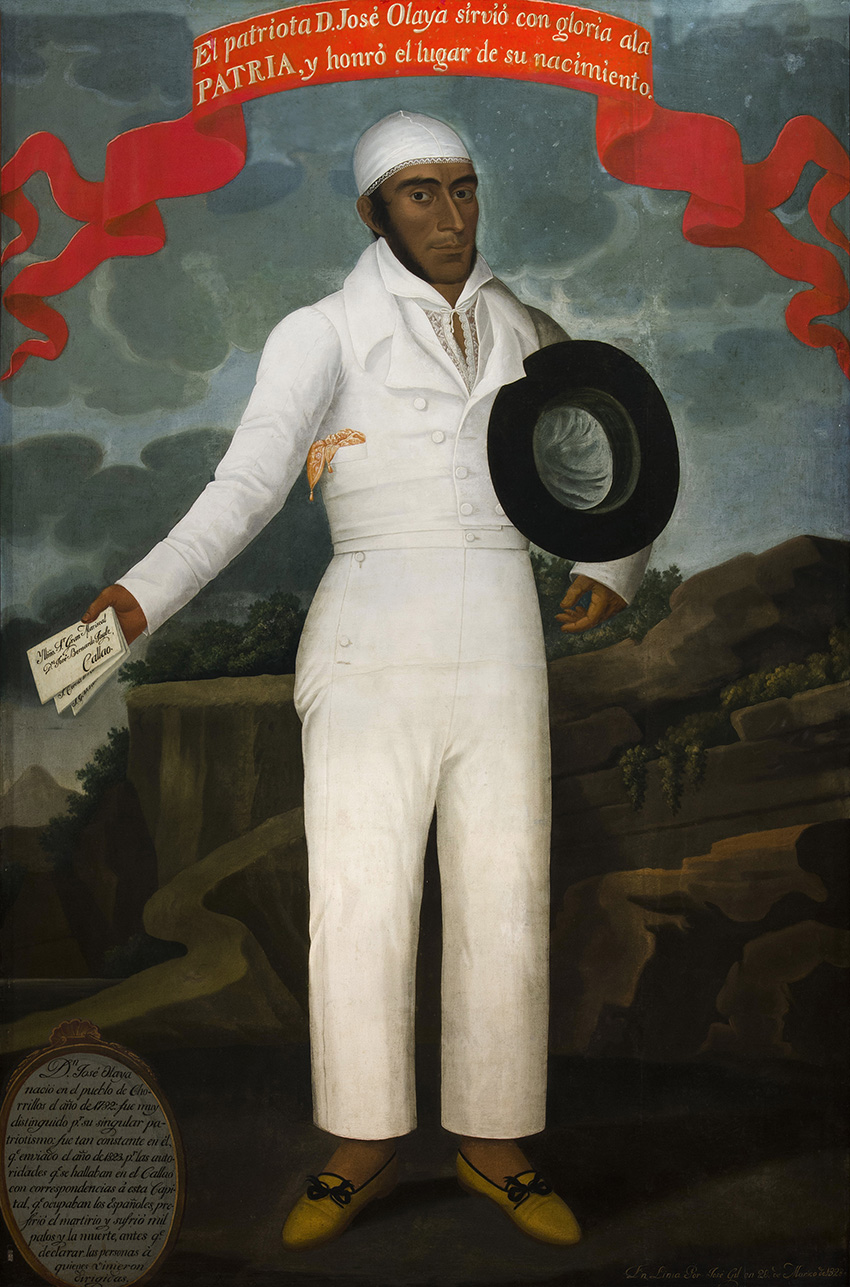
- Posthumous portrait by José Gil de Castro, 1828
- Born: 1782; Chorrillos, Viceroyalty of Peru, Spanish Empire
- Died: June 29, 1823 (aged 40–41); Callejón de Petateros, Lima, Peru
- Occupation: Fisherman

José Silverio Olaya Balandra or José O. Laya (1789 or July 20, 1791 – June 29, 1823) was an indigenous Peruvian fisherman who became a hero of the Peruvian War of Independence.

The Peruvian sailor and geographer Germán Stiglich, when reviewing Peruvian port records, did not find any Olaya (a Spanish surname), but several Laya (a name of pre-Columbian origin), concluding that the martyr's real name was José O. Laya — a view later spread by the Peruvian historian Juan José Vega.

== Biography ==
The son of Jose Apolinario Olaya and Cordoba and doña Melchora Balandra. He had 11 siblings. In 2023, his baptismal record was located, establishing his previously contested birth date as July 20, 1791.

“In the City of the Kings, on the fifth of February, seventeen ninety-two. I, Licentiate Don Sebastián Guerrero […] anointed with oil and chrism Silberio, an Indian child six months and fifteen days old, to whom in case of necessity Father Fray Eusebio Ramires, a friar of the Order of Mercy, had poured the baptismal water. Legitimate son of José [Apolinario] Olalla and Melchora Balandra. His godfather was S. Juan Dionisio Toledo; witnesses were Ciriaco Obiedo and Pedro Techum.”

In the struggle for the independence of Peru, José Olaya acted as secret emissary carrying messages between the Government of Callao and Lima Patriots by swimming. He was discovered, arrested and subjected to torture and sentenced to death. Despite the torture, he never revealed his mission and willingly swallowed the letters assigned to the mission. The independence of Peru, first declared in Huaura in November 1820 and July 28, 1821 in Lima, had become effective only in Lima and in the north, but Cuzco, the central highlands and south were still under the rule of the royal army.

When José de San Martín recognized the little support given to political and military forces, he resigned from the Constituent Congress of Peru, 1822. The congress appointed José de la Riva Agüero as President of the Republic and Francisco Xavier de Luna Pizarro as Congress President. The royal army, taking advantage of the fact that the patriotic troops were far away, took Lima and members of Congress took refuge in the Real Felipe Fortress in Callao. It is at this stage that José Olaya, a fisherman by trade, did not hesitate to serve as a link between the ships of the squadron Liberator (formed by units of the Republic of Chile) and the soldiers of the patriotic forces (Argentina, Chile and Peru) located in Lima, even if it meant walking across fields and swimming in the sea.

Imprisoned by the royal army, he was tortured in order to obtain information about the patriotic forces. José Olaya Balandra was not frightened of pain. He suffered two hundred lashes of the whip and two hundred beatings with sticks, not yielding even after they tore out his nails. Finally, on the morning of June 29, 1823 he uttered the phrase:

If I had a thousand lives, I would gladly give them for my homeland.

The Avenida Jose Olaya in Lima, Callao, Chorrillos and Villa María del Triunfo, Peru are named after him.
