= Manuel de Odriozola =

Manuel de Odriozola (August 11, 1804 in Lima – August 12, 1889) was a Peruvian soldier, scholar, librarian and historian. He was the son of Manuel de Odriozola and Jacinta Herrera.

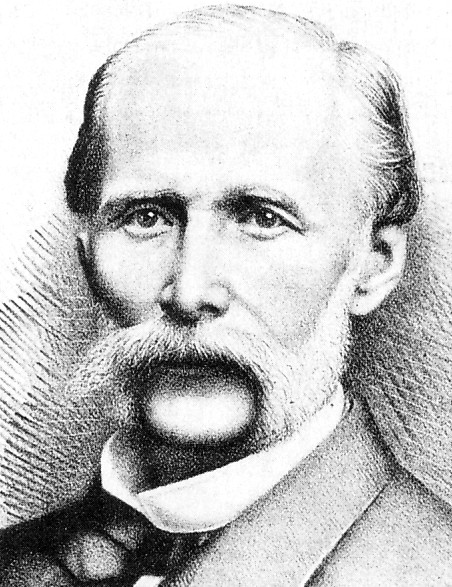
Manuel de Odriozola

== Biography ==
In 1818, after the death of his father, Odriozola was left in charge of the upkeep of the home. He did calligraphy work entrusted to him by an employee of the Virreunal Secretariat to provide for himself financially. Two years later, upon learning of the landing of the Expedición Libertadora (Liberation Expedition), he went to Pisco to join it, being one of the first patriots to do so. Within a year he was promoted to cavalry lieutenant. He participated in the Proclamation of Independence and was stationed in Callao until the surrender of the realists. Shortly thereafter, in 1822, he was ascended to the position of Captain and the following participated in the Zepita Battle. However, upon the advance of the realists, he quickly migrated to Trujillo, where he continued to contribute to public life.
