= Parque de la Muralla =

Park in Lima, Peru

Coordinates: 12°02′39″S 77°01′36″W

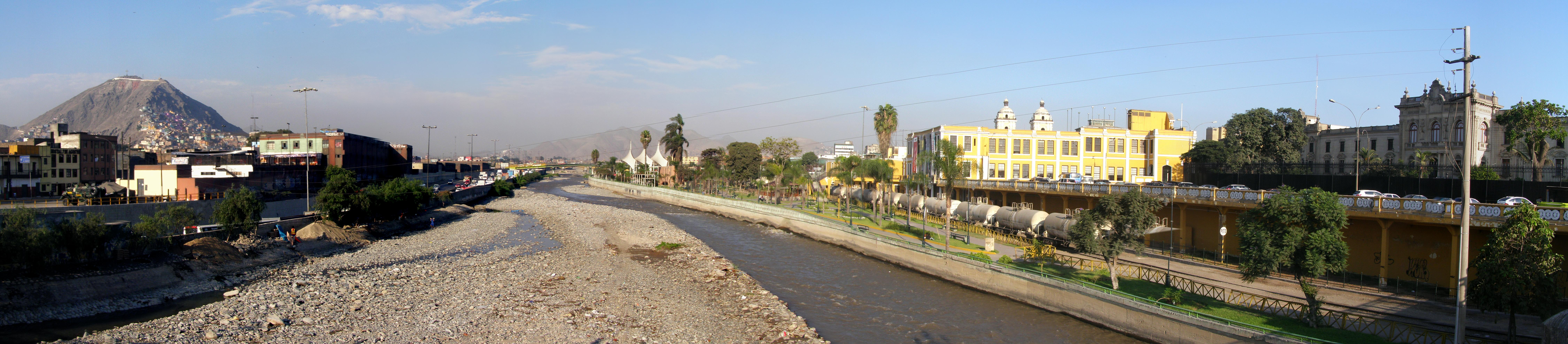
The park (right) running alongside the Rímac.

The Park of the Wall (Spanish: Parque de La Muralla) is a public park located in the central district of Lima, Peru. It was inaugurated in 2004. Within its extension is part of the former Walls of Lima. The park is located between the Rímac River and the historic centre of Lima.

== History ==
During the administration of Luis Castañeda Lossio, a section of the remains of the left bank of the Rímac River was recovered and which now forms the park. In this it is possible to see remains of the bases that the cutwater had, the work of the Franciscans in 1610. For this purpose, part of said wall has been recovered in the rear area of the Church of San Francisco, very close to the Government Palace.

The park has a restaurant, a crafts store from different areas of the country, where the statue of the conquistador Francisco Pizarro was located from 2003 to 2025, having previously been located in what is now Peru Square, located next to the Government Palace; In addition, there is a site museum that exhibits archaeological pieces found in the area.

== See also ==
- Walls of Lima
