= Jirón Huallaga =

Street in Lima, Peru

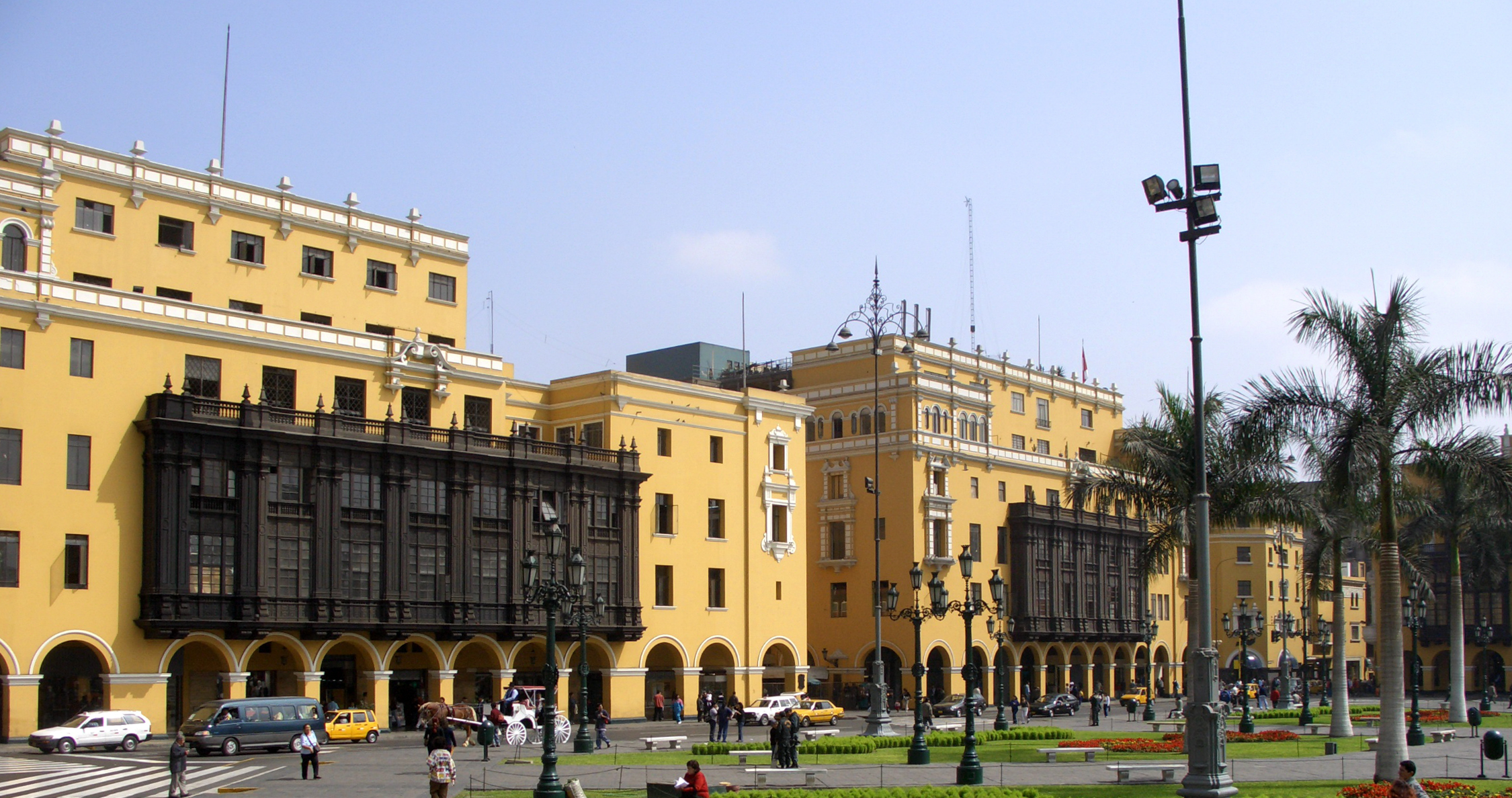
- Huallaga and Olaya streets, as seen from Carabaya Street
- Interactive map of Jirón Huallaga
- Part of: Damero de Pizarro
- Namesake: Huallaga River
- From: Jirón de la Unión
- Major junctions: Jirón Carabaya, Jirón Lampa, Jirón Azángaro, Abancay Avenue, Jirón Ayacucho, Jirón Andahuaylas, Jirón Paruro, Jirón Huanta
- To: Jirón Cangallo

Construction
- Completion: 1535

Huallaga Street (Spanish: Jirón Huallaga) is a major street in the Damero de Pizarro, located in the historic centre of Lima, Peru. The street starts at its intersection with the Jirón de la Unión at the Plaza Mayor and continues until it reaches Jirón Cangallo in Barrios Altos, about a block after it passes through the Plaza Italia.

== History ==
The road that today constitutes the Huallaga jirón was laid by Francisco Pizarro when he founded the city of Lima on January 18, 1535. In its first block, to the north, the extension corresponding to the Plaza de Armas was arranged and in its second block, also to the north, the land corresponding to the priest's home and intended for the construction of the church.

In 1538 the construction of the first church in Lima was completed. This church was rebuilt and renovated several times, taking its final form in 1797. This street is where the Almagrist supporters who murdered Francisco Pizarro came from in 1546.

In the 1560s, the Viceroy Count of Nieva ordered the construction of gates in the streets that surrounded the main square. The construction was fully established during the government of Francisco de Toledo. In 1690, the Viceroy Count of Monclova ordered the construction of new gates, the same ones that remained until 1943 when the current buildings on the first block of this strip were built.

During the government of Viceroy Andrés Hurtado de Mendoza, the Royal Hospital of Saint Andrew was created on land located in the eighth block of this road, named after him.

In 1573, the Monasterio de la Purísima Concepción was built on the fifth block of this road and occupied several blocks that were gradually expropriated. This monastery is the second to be founded in Lima, five years after the Monasterio de la Encarnación which was founded in 1568.

During the late 18th century and early 19th century, Hipólito Unanue lived on this street. He also had as a neighbour the mayor of Lima Antonio Salinas y Castañeda, who built the Casa Salinas in front of the Concepción church. In 1862, when a new urban nomenclature was adopted, the road was named jirón Huallaga. Prior to this renaming, each block (cuadra) had a unique name:

- Block 1: Portal de Botoneros, after the merchants that sold buttons, as well as hats and silk fabrics on the street.
- Block 2: Judíos, after a painting of Jewish torture in the wall of the Cathedral, where the names of Jews condemned by the Inquisition were written and where their effigies were located.
- Block 3: Melchormalo, after the Melchor Malo de Molina family.
- Block 4: Virreina, after the house of Ana Francisca de Borja y Doria.
- Block 5: Concepción, after the monastery of the same name built there in 1573. It was also the location of the home of Antonio Salinas y Castañeda, Mayor of Lima between 1866 and 1868.
- Block 6: Presa, after a bastardisation of its original name.
- Block 7: Lechugal, for reasons not entirely known.
- Block 8: San Andrés, after the hospital of the same name.

In 1849, a block was expropriated from the Monasterio de la Concepción with the purpose of building the Mercado de Abastos there. The expropriation was not peaceful and led to the creation of Paz Soldán Street (block 4 of the current Jirón Ayacucho), named after the Minister of Foreign Affairs of Peru at that time, José Gregorio Paz Soldán, who promoted the expropriation. The construction of the market began under the government of Ramón Castilla and was completed under the government of José Rufino Echenique. This construction lasted until 1964 when it was consumed by a fire. In 1947, with the widening of Abancay Avenue, additional land was expropriated from the Monasterio de la Concepción.

In the 20th century the street saw the construction of large buildings and public spaces. In 1967, an eight-story building—the current location of the Central Market of Lima—was built.

== See also ==
- Historic Centre of Lima
