= Pasaje Olaya =

Street in Lima, Peru

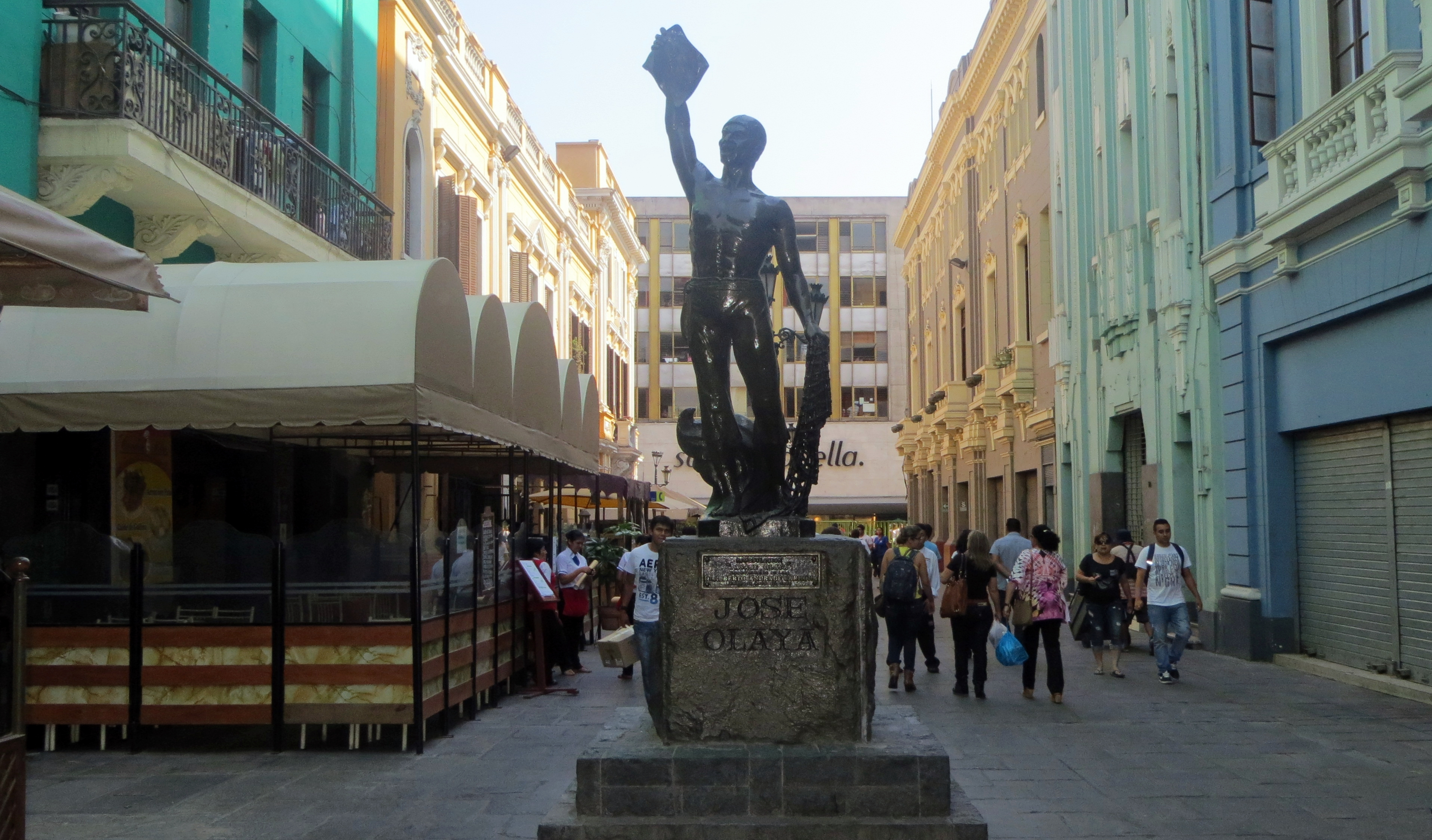
- The street's statue
- Part of: Damero de Pizarro
- Namesake: José Olaya
- From: Jirón Huallaga
- To: Jirón Ucayali

Construction
- Completion: 1535

Pasaje José Olaya is a pedestrian alleyway located in the Damero de Pizarro, next to the Plaza Mayor of Lima, Peru. It is the location of a statue of the same name, which was declared part of the Cultural heritage of Peru alongside the other statues located within the historic centre of Lima in 2018.

== History ==
The alleyway dates back to the foundation of the city, taking several names throughout its history. It was originally called the Cajellón de la Cruz due to it being the location of a cross used to punish criminals in its exit towards the Plaza Mayor. By 1613, it took the name Callejón de los Sombrereros due to the number of hat-selling businesses there, alternatively called the Callejón de los Mercaderes. One of its merchants, Juan Fernández de la Higuera, was the namesake for block 2 of nearby Jirón Cuzco. It also took the name Callejón de los Clérigos at one point. Its last name after independence, Callejón de Petateros, had existed since the late 18th century.

On June 29, 1823, José Olaya, a rebel supporter that acted as a secret emissary during the Peruvian War of Independence was caught and executed by firing squad on the site by the Royal Army of Peru for treason.

=== Planned avenue ===
Starting in 1901, due to the poor conditions at the alleyway (now the Pasaje 28 de Julio or the Jirón 28 de Julio), a new road that would connect the Plaza Mayor with a projected public square located five blocks to the south (intended to house a new City Hall and Congress Building) was proposed by the local government, eventually acquiring the name of Avenida 28 de Julio. After the abandonment of the project, it kept its pedestrian nature and was ultimately renamed after Olaya.

== See also ==
- Historic Centre of Lima
- Pasaje Santa Rosa
