= Equestrian statue of Francisco Pizarro =

Statues by Charles Cary Rumsey

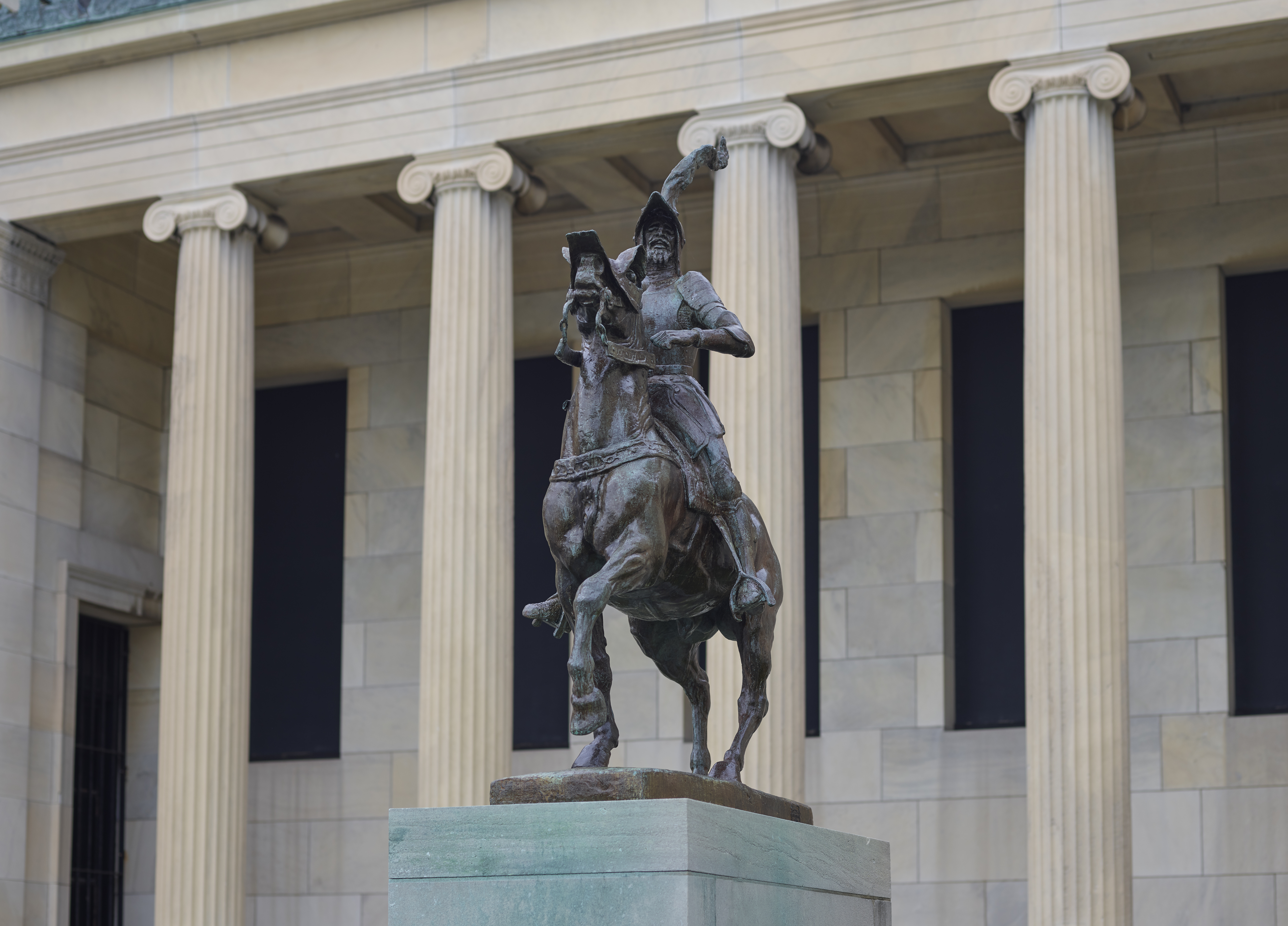
- Statue in Buffalo NY
- Location: Buffalo, Trujillo and Lima
- Type: Equestrian statue
- Material: Bronze

The Equestrian statue of Francisco Pizarro (Spanish: Estatua ecuestre de Francisco Pizarro) is a series of three bronze equestrian statues of Spanish Conquistador Francisco Pizarro by U.S. sculptor Charles Cary Rumsey. The statues are located in Buffalo (in front of the Albright-Knox Art Gallery), Trujillo (in the Plaza Mayor) and Lima (next to the Plaza Mayor). The latter two cities are Pizarro's places of birth and death, respectively.

The statues represent the conquistador Francisco Pizarro mounted on a horse and dressed for fighting with armor and sword. Pizarro is famous for having led the Conquest of Peru in the 16th century and having founded the city of Lima on January 18, 1535, establishing what would become the Viceroyalty of Peru.

== Statues ==
=== Statue in Buffalo ===
It was the first of the statues to be made. Cast in Paris in 1910 using the lost wax technique by the French master Marcello Valsuani, caster of works by artists such as Renoir and Picasso. The work measures just under 1.80 m in height and can currently be admired on the front of the Albright-Knox Art Gallery, an institution to which it was donated by the artist and his wife.

=== Statue in Trujillo ===
The equestrian statue of Francisco Pizarro located in Trujillo, province of Cáceres, was exhibited in the Dome Room of the Grand Palais in Paris in 1927 and later moved to the conqueror's hometown. It was presented on June 2, 1929, in the atrium of the Church of San Martín in the Plaza Mayor, in an event in which the then dictator and president of the government, General Miguel Primo de Rivera and Prince Alfonso de Orleans were present, as well as the then United States ambassador to Spain and the Peruvian minister plenipotentiary, Eduardo S. Leguía. The space for its placement was chosen by the sculptor's widow, who traveled years before, in April 1925, to Spain for this purpose.

=== Statue in Lima ===
The statue of Lima was inaugurated on January 18, 1935, on the occasion of the celebration of the fourth centennial of the founding of the city. The sculpture was a donation from the sculptor Rumsey's widow and had arrived from New York City. The statue's original location was the atrium of the Metropolitan Cathedral of Lima.

In 1952 it was moved to the Plaza Pizarro, and in 2003 it was relocated to Parque de La Muralla after 17 months in a warehouse, without the pedestal with which it was inaugurated and that it had throughout its history, being placed on a concrete base. On January 15, 2025, it was again moved to a pedestrian street next to the Plaza Mayor to be inaugurated, with the pedestal, as part of the city's 490th anniversary on the 18th.

== Historical discrepancies ==
There are certain elements that make one doubt that the conquistador Pizarro is faithfully represented by the rider of the statue or, at least, that it is a historically correct sculpture. Among these elements are:

- In the history of Spanish armor there is no evidence of a feathered helmet like the one worn by the rider. The helmets of the Spanish soldiers were made of very simple iron, as can be seen in hundreds of engravings from the time.
- The horses that were used in the conquest brought from Spain were very fast and small, unlike the one the rider in the sculpture is riding.
- The sword of the conquistadors was very light, made of Toledo steel and with a different handguard than the one seen in the sculpture.

== Gallery ==
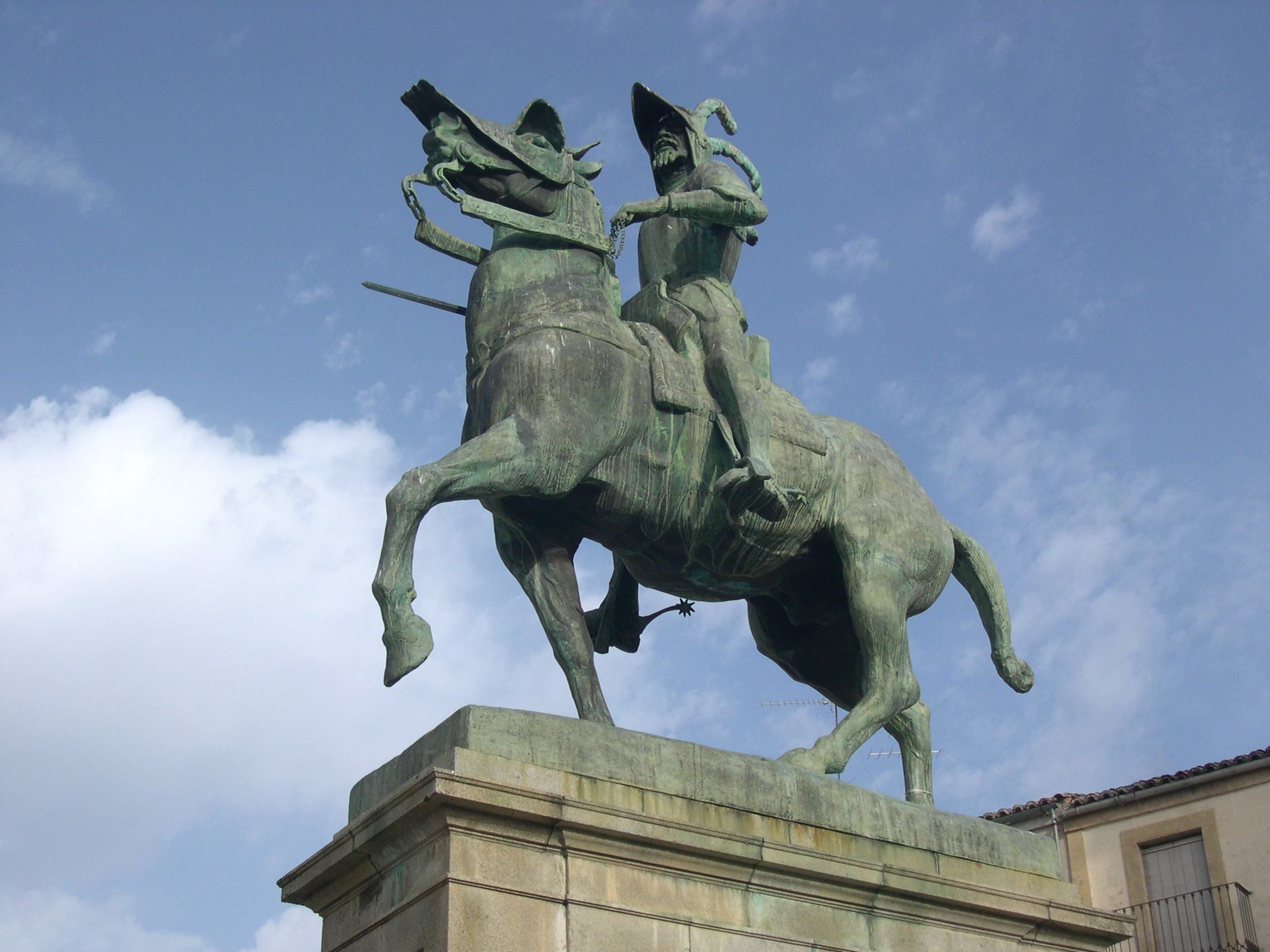
The statue in Trujillo (Spain)

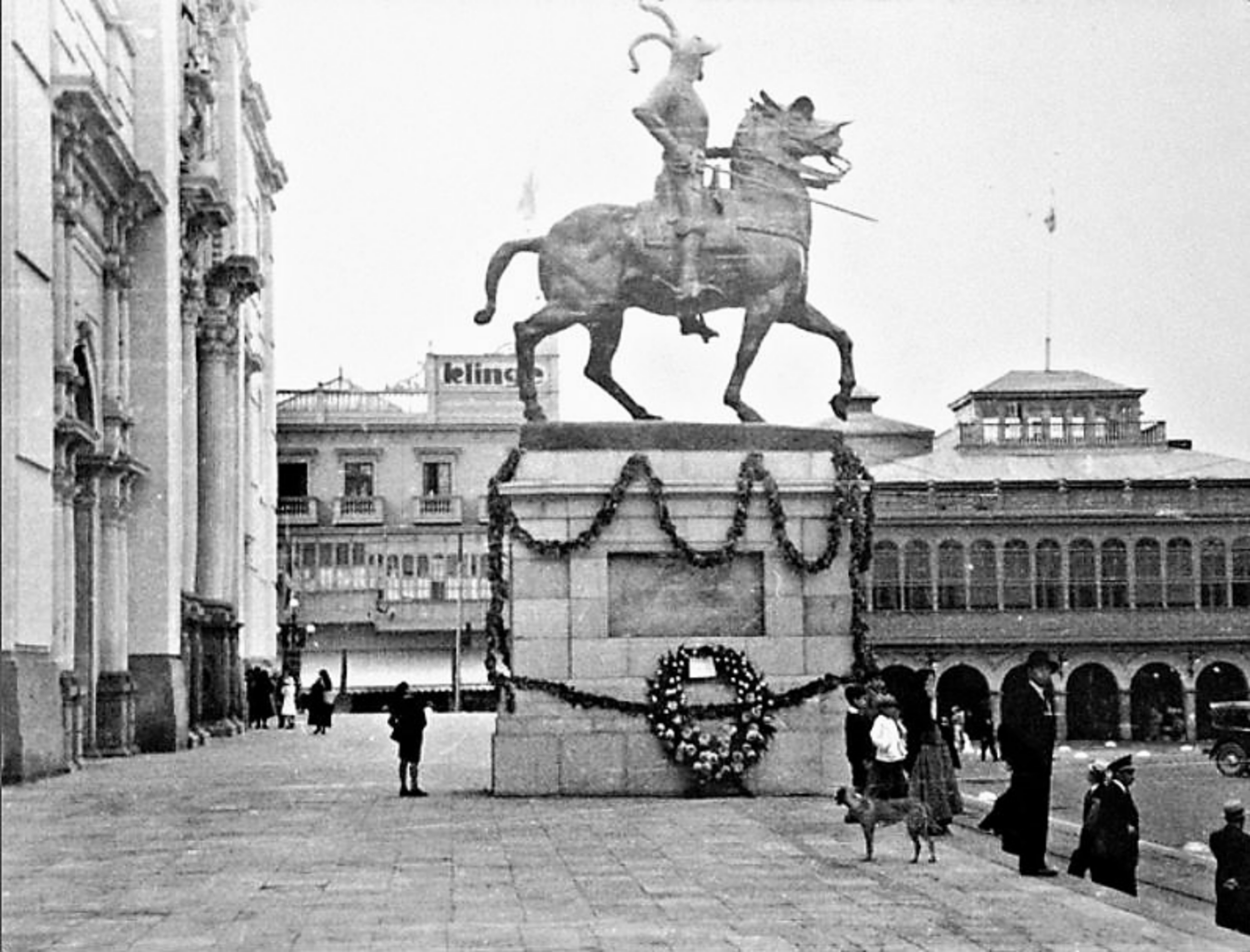
The statue in Lima (Peru)
(Location from 1935–1952)

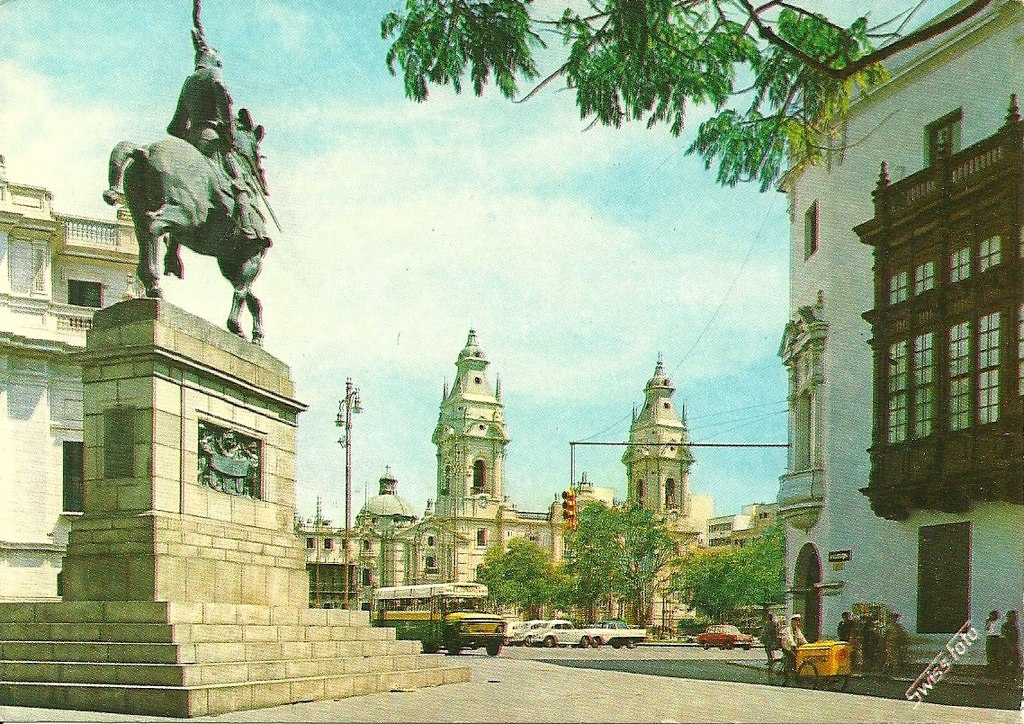
The statue in Lima (Peru)
(Location from 1952–2003)

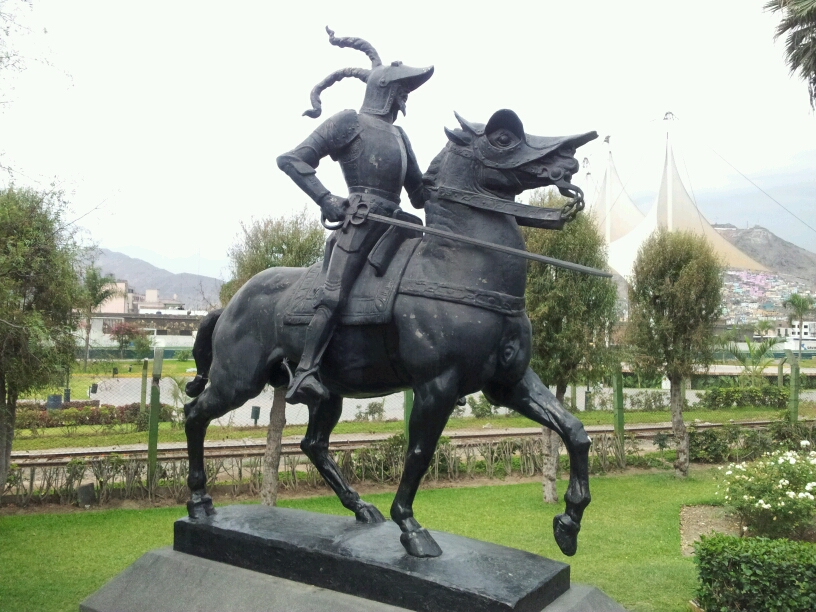
The statue in Lima (Peru)
(Location from 2003–2025)

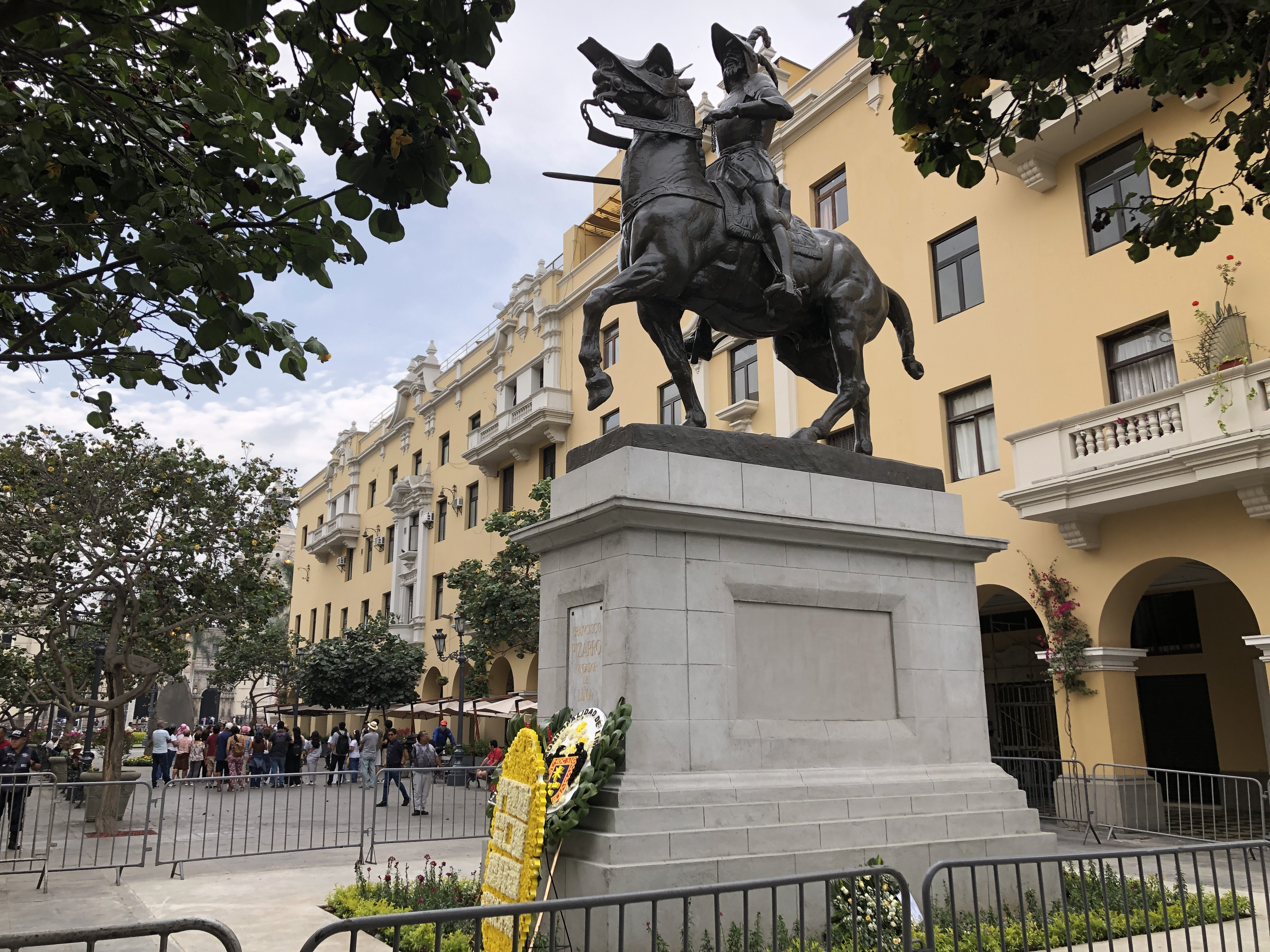
The statue in Lima (Peru)
(Location since 2025)

== See also ==
- Palacio de la Conquista
