= Palacio Municipal de Lima =

Government building in Lima, Peru

Coordinates: 12.0453°S 77.0311°W

Municipal Palace of Lima
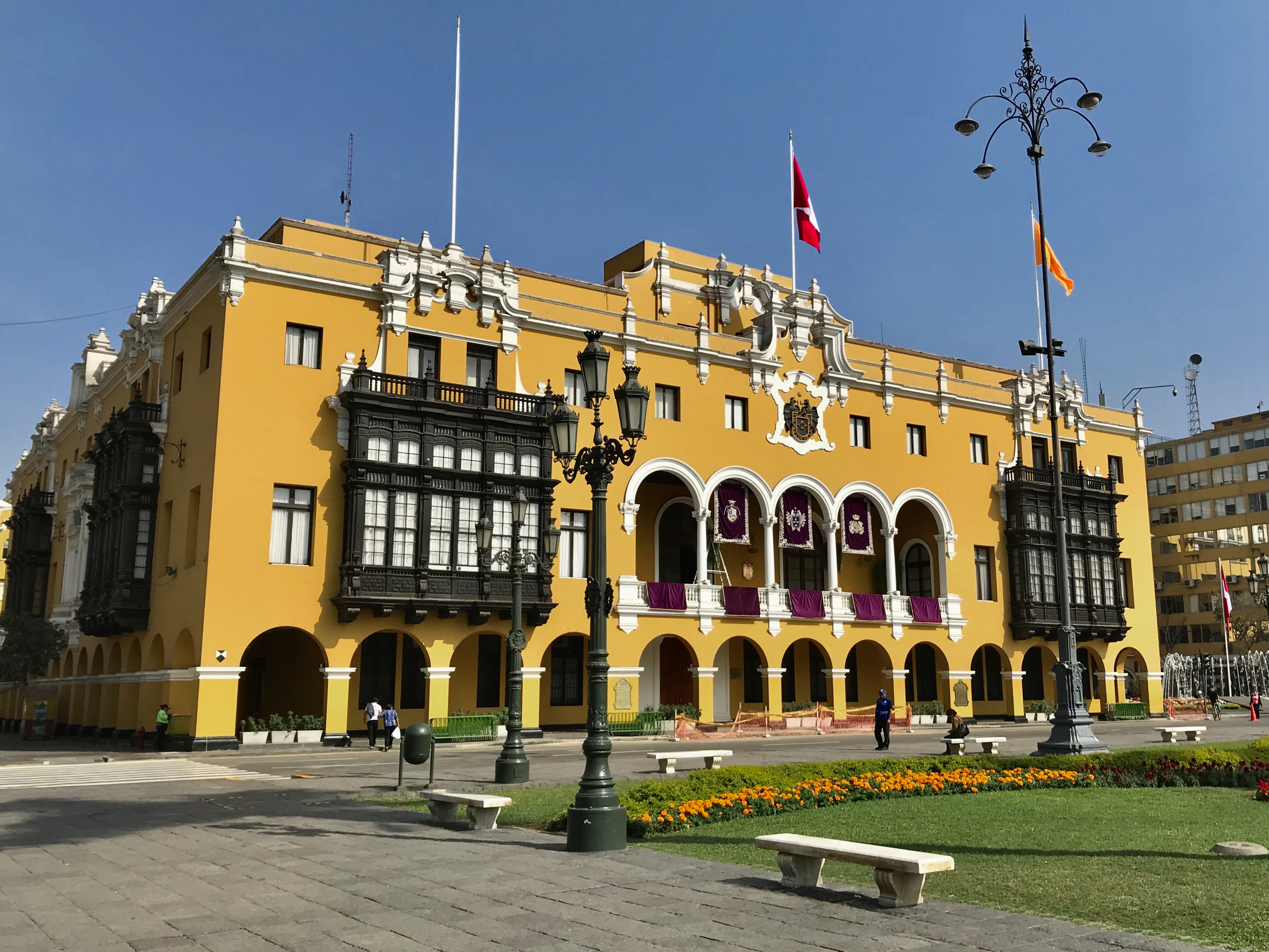
- Interactive map of the Municipal Palace of Lima area

General information
- Architectural style: Neo-Colonial (Note: The building's interior is styled in the French Renaissance style.)
- Location: Lima, Peru
- Year built: 1943–1944
- Inaugurated: July 2, 1944

Design and construction
- Architects: Emilio Harth Terré; José Alvarez Calderón; Ricardo de Jaxa Malachowski

The Municipal Palace of Lima (Spanish: Palacio Municipal de Lima) is a government building located on the third block of Union Street, (Note: Traditionally known as the Portal de Escribanos prior to the adoption of a new urban nomenclature in 1862.) next to the Plaza Mayor, in the Historic Centre of Lima, Peru. It functions as the seat of the Metropolitan Municipality of Lima.

== History ==
=== Viceroyalty ===
According to the first book of the Cabildo de Lima, the city had two mayors on the fourth day of its foundation: Nicolás de Ribera and Juan Tello de Guzmán. At first the council worked at the House of Pizarro and then moved to the residence of the Judges Andrés de Cianca and Pedro Maldonado, then the local municipality, before settling in the last weeks of October 1535 on land owned by the supplier García de Salcedo, where the Archbishop's Palace of Lima currently stands. However, because more space was needed for the Cathedral of Lima, the council moved in 1548 to land owned by Hernando Pizarro, the huaca of the chapter that had a pen of llamas, and this is where the current municipal building is located.

The colonial town hall building was simple and the story of its construction has been bumpy. The master Diego de Torres was asked to build the first building of the Cabildo de Lima and in 1549 began the work quickly, with two black slaves acquired especially to strengthen his work, because I had finished before the arrival of Antonio de Mendoza, fourth viceroy of Peru, which was scheduled for September 23, 1551. The council houses built by master Diego de Torres were made with brick mold and high wood to Spain.

Soon after, in 1555, Cristóbal Garzón and Diego de Amaro took charge of the new building. During the following years some minor fixes continued such as woodwork and blanket. José de la Riva Agüero then stated that the building had collapsed due to its faulty construction. The council members were present, from the old town hall colonial balconies, processions, bullfights and auto-da-fé.

The history of the Limean Inquisition recalls the auto-da-fé held on Sunday, April 5, 1592, for which the council built a wooden platform. By 1628, the historian and priest Bernabé Cobo described in his History of the Founding of Lima the Lima cabildo's appearance and said:

«Under these portals fall of the city jail, with its chapel that is so large and well decorated and served that can be called church, and the offices of the clerks, especially the chapter on the door make audience the ordinary mayors.»

The council building was characterized, between 1596 and 1604 (period of government Viceroy Luis de Velasco y Castilla) by its open gallery on the second floor, on the portals of scribes. According to Manuel de Odriozola, the Rímac River Bridge collapsed on the night of February 11, 1696, causing a flood in the Plaza Mayor and the protocols they had them on the floor, not on shelves so scarce and expensive it was the wood rotted enforcement tools and foundations of chaplaincies and primogeniture, whose replacement was difficult and costly. But the greatest damage suffered by the colonial cabildo caused the 1746 Lima-Callao earthquake, which destroyed 90% of the civil colonial buildings.

== See also ==
- Metropolitan Municipality of Lima
- City Hall
- Historic Center of Lima
- Lima
