= Plaza Mayor, Lima =

Cultural heritage site in Peru

Coordinates: 12°02′45″S 77°01′50″W

Plaza Mayor of Lima
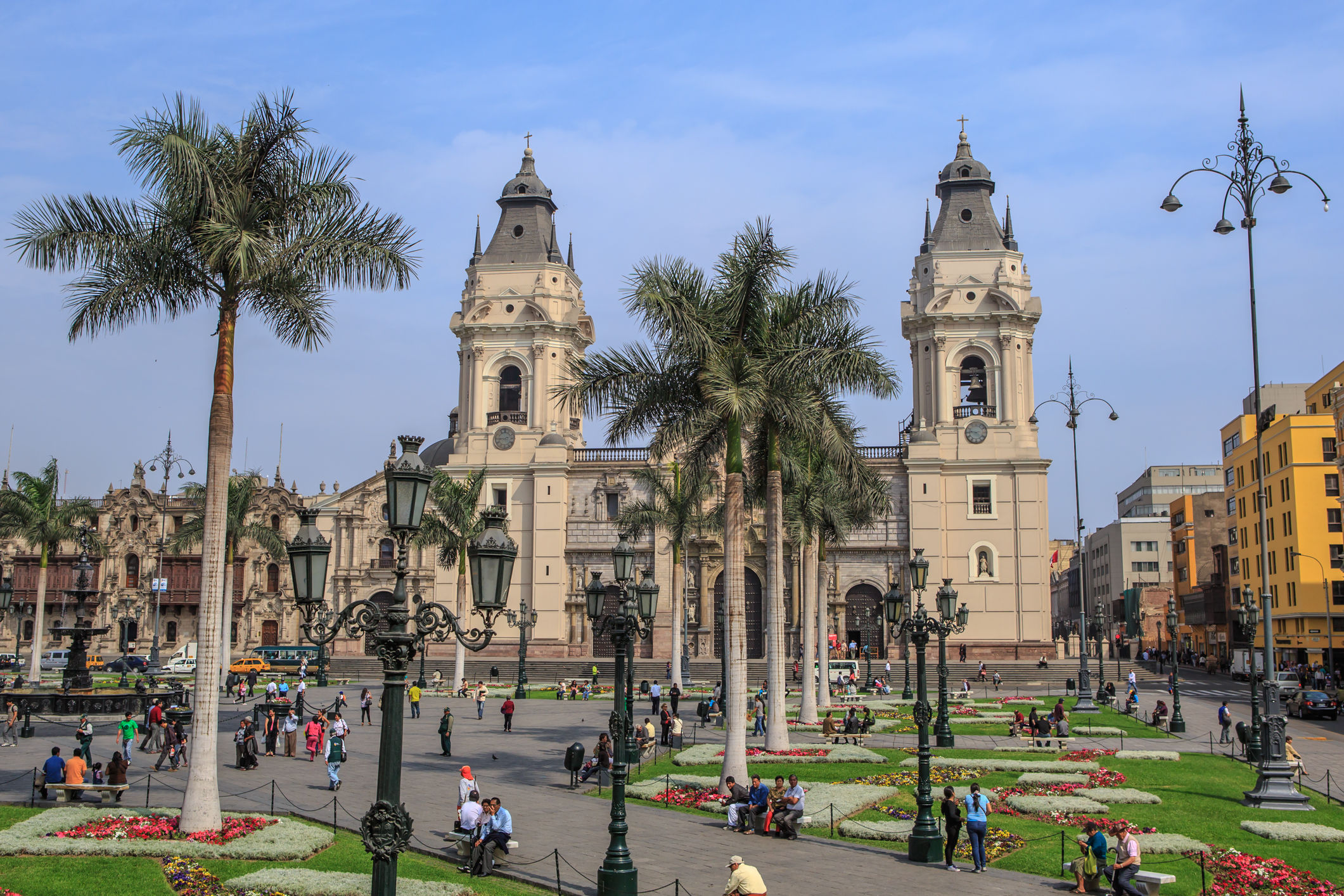

- Location within Lima
- Location: Lima, Peru

History
- Built: 18 January 1535

UNESCO World Heritage Site
- Official name: Plaza Mayor de Lima
- Type: Non-movable
- Criteria: Monument
- Designated: 1991
- Part of: Historic Centre of Lima
- Reference no.: 500

The Plaza Mayor (English: Town square), also known as the Plaza de Armas, is the main public square of the historic centre of the city of Lima, Peru. It dates back to the foundation of the city by Francisco Pizarro on 18 January 1535. Delimited by Carabaya, Junín, Huallaga, and Unión streets, it is surrounded by a number of major landmarks, including the Government Palace, the Metropolitan Cathedral, the Archbishop's Palace, the Municipal Palace, and the Palacio de la Unión.

== History ==
In 1523, King Charles I of Spain mandated the Procedures for the creation of cities in the New World. These procedures indicated that after outlining a city's plan, growth should follow a grid centered on the square shape of the plaza.

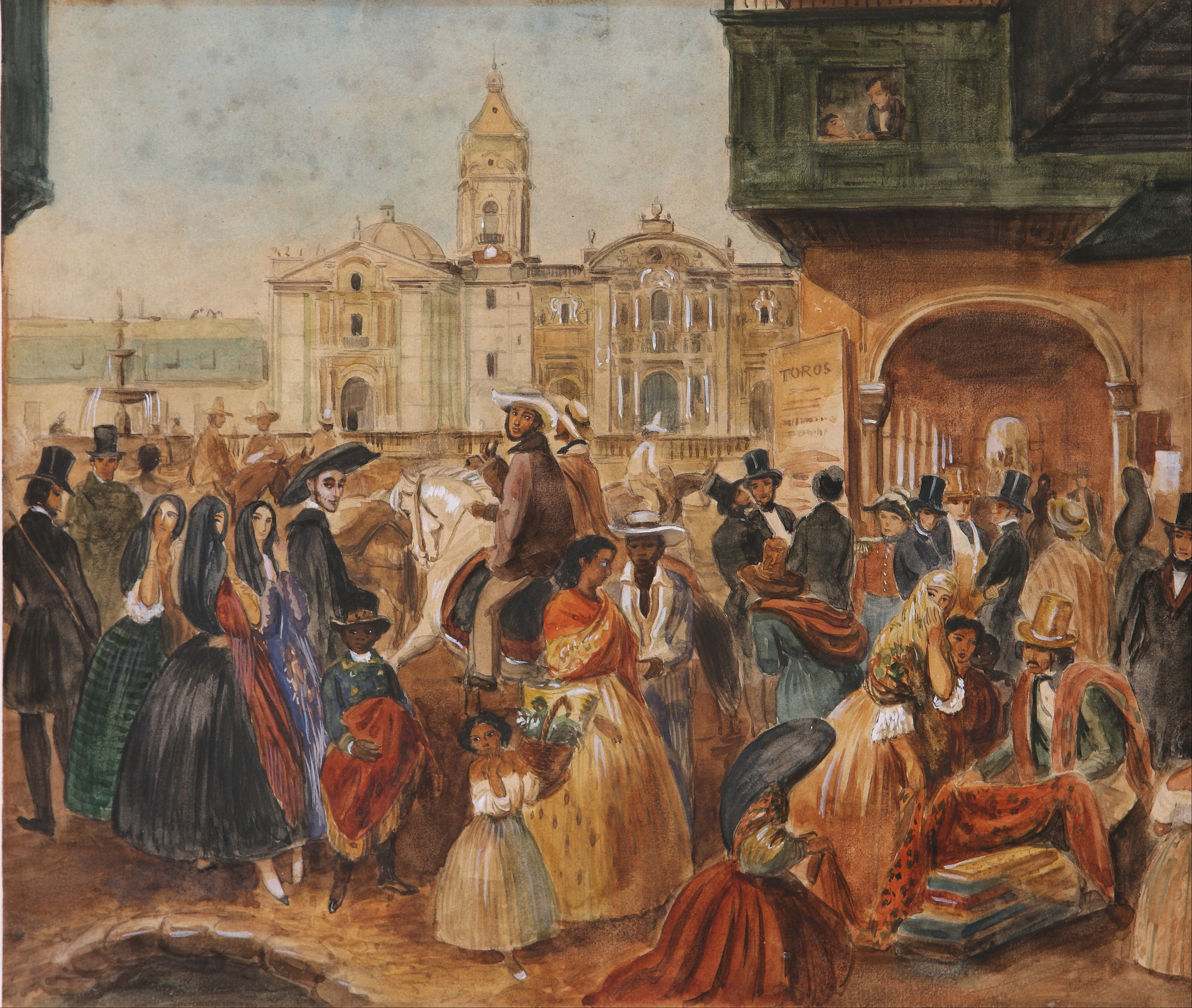
Plaza Mayor in 1843

On the day of the foundation of the city, 18 January

The 17th-century historian Bernabé Cobo said of the plaza:

It is the finest and most well-formed [plaza] that I have ever seen, even in Spain. It occupies an entire block, with the width of four streets on one side and four streets on the other, and with all four sides it measures more than two thousand feet; it is very ample.

Subsequently, the viceroy Diego López de Zúñiga y Velasco, count of Nieva, proposed the gallows, which had previously been located at the centre of the plaza, be moved nearer to the river to the location which is now the Desamparados train station. In place of it, a new water fountain was built at the centre of the plaza. The gallows were returned to the south side of the plaza on the Callejón de Petateros.

The first water fountain built on the plaza was constructed by the viceroy Francisco de Toledo, and was inaugurated on 21 October 1578. It consisted of a baluster and an elevated bowl, and in it had eight pipes through which water fell into the bowl on the next level. A ball at the top of the fountain dispersed water back onto the lower levels. The seal of the city was inscribed on this ball.

The water fountain was replaced in by the viceroy García Sarmiento de Sotomayor, Count of Salvatierra, who inaugurated it on 8 September 1651. This fountain remains as the centerpiece of the plaza to this day.

During the colonial era, the plaza served as a market, bull fighting ring, and the city gallows. The plaza also became home to the auto-da-fé in which the Inquisition occurred. The tribunal of the Inquisition had one of its three courts located in Lima. The first conviction occurred on 15 November 1573, and this was the first heretic to be tried and executed in the New World.

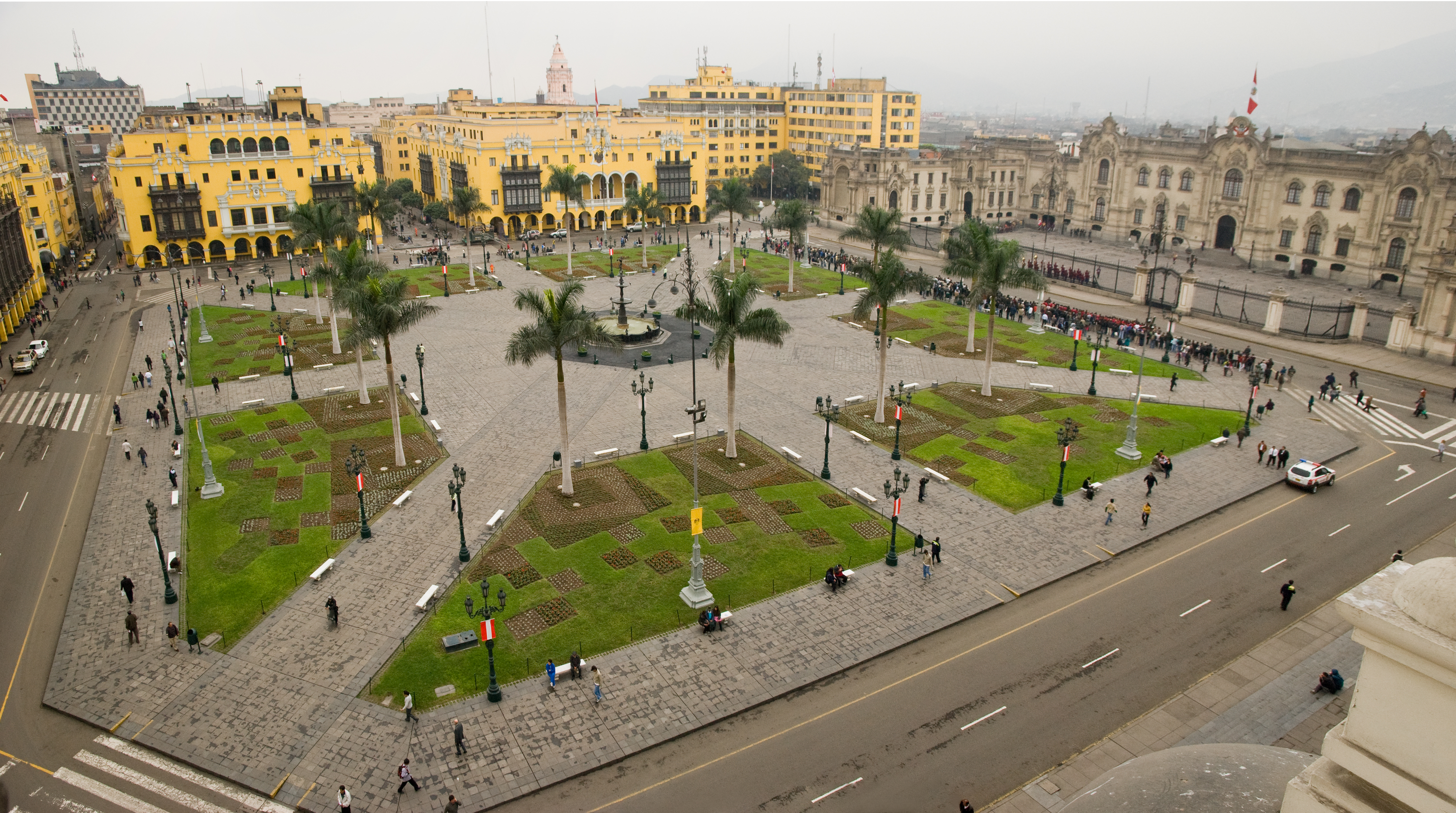
Plaza Mayor in 2013

In 1622, the Metropolitan Cathedral of Lima is completed. This church still stands today on the plaza.

In the early nineteenth century, chef Juan José Cabezudo had a food stall in the Escribanos portal, a place very close to the plaza, where he served typical Peruvian dishes, including tamales.

In 1821, José de San Martín proclaimed the Independence of Peru on this plaza. After this historic event, the flag of the new republic was paraded around the plaza.

In 1855, President Ramón Castilla inaugurated the first public gas lighting system which were first installed on the light posts of the plaza. Also at this time, gardens were planted on the plaza as up until this time it was made of pavement. In 1860, the first rail ways for trams were installed on the plaza.

In 1922, construction of the Archbishop's Palace of Lima was completed. In 1938, the Government Palace was completed and in 1944 the Municipal Palace was completed.

During the Internal conflict in Peru, the square was attacked by car bombs on June 7, 1985, and on July 14, 1986.

== Surroundings ==
Location of buildings surrounding the Plaza Mayor
Northern side
Western side				Eastern side
Peru Square	Government Palace			Casa del Oidor
Municipal Palace	Fountain PLAZA MAYOR OF LIMA			Archiepiscopal Palace
Pasaje Santa Rosa	Fountain PLAZA MAYOR OF LIMA			Sagrario de Lima Metropolitan Cathedral
Palacio de la Unión	Fountain PLAZA MAYOR OF LIMA			Sagrario de Lima Metropolitan Cathedral
Beginning of Union Street	Edificio Guardia Real	Pasaje Olaya	Edificio Calvo, headquarters of Caretas.	Building at 400 Union St.
Southern side

== See also ==
- Historic Centre of Lima
- Viceroyalty of Peru

== Bibliography ==
- Cobo, Bernabé. "Historia de la Fundación de Lima"
- Bromley, Juan. "Las viejas calles de Lima" Lima: Municipalidad Metropolitana de Lima. Gerencia de Educación, Cultura y Deportes. Edilibros; 2005.
- Joffre, Gabriel Ramón. "El guión de la cirugía urbana: Lima 1850-1940"
