= Ricardo de Jaxa Malachowski =

Polish-Peruvian architect

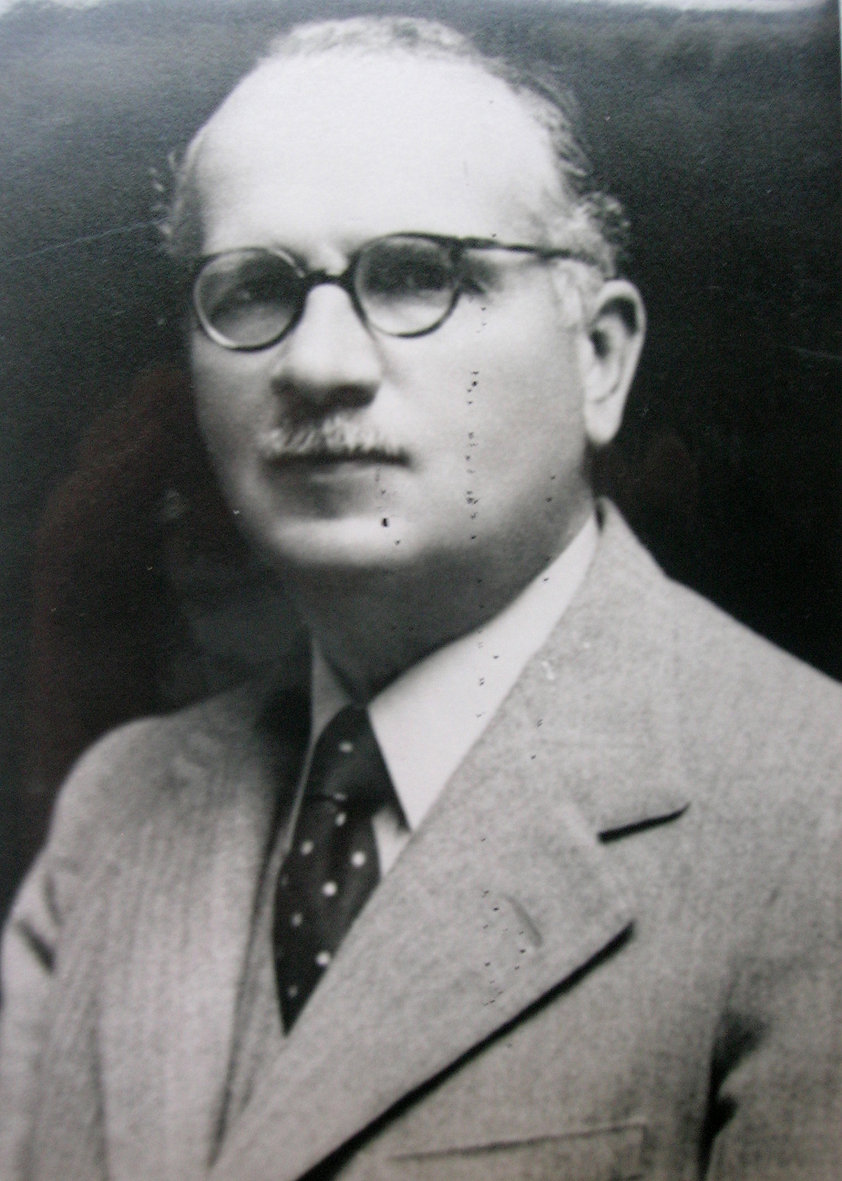
- Born: Ryszard Jaxa-Malachowski; May 14, 1887; Prochorowa (near Odessa), Russian Empire
- Died: 6 December 1972 (aged 85); Lima, Peru
- Known for: Architect, Author
- Works: See relevant section
- Spouse: María Benavides Diez Canseco
- Children: María, Malvina, Augusto, Ricardo

Ryszard Jaxa-Małachowski Kulisicz (Odessa, May 14, 1887 — Lima, September 6, 1972), later known as Ricardo de Jaxa Małachowski, was a Polish-Peruvian architect, active in Peru for nearly all of his professional career. He was one of the major architects of the capital city of Lima, working in the design and construction of over 15 major buildings in the city.

== Biography ==
Ryszard Jaxa Małachowski was born on May 14, 1887, in Odessa, then part of the Russian Empire (present day Ukraine). He was the son of August Jaxa Małachowski and Malwina Kulisicz. At age 13, Ricardo traveled to Saint Petersburg and applied to enter the Navy Academy of Odessa. However, he was not admitted into the program due to his poor vision. He then continued his education in a secondary school in Odessa, where he graduated in 1905.

He traveled to Paris shortly after to attend the École des Beaux-Arts and pursued architecture. Malachowski arrived in Lima on December 22, 1911. He was immediately put to work by President Augusto B. Leguía, who asked him to design and install the sacristy of the chapel of the Government Palace.

In 1914, he married María Benavides Diez Canseco, the daughter of future president Óscar R. Benavides. Together, they had 4 children: Maria, Malvina, Augusto and Ricardo.

In late 1933, Malachowski was almost killed during a robbery near Villa María School in Arequipa Avenue, today the Alliance Française.

In addition to the city centre, he was the architect of various buildings in the city's residential sectors and sea resorts (such as Santa María del Mar, San Bartolo & Santa María de Chosica). Malachowski was an impact to the overall architecture of the city in the time that he lived and worked there.

He died on December 6, 1972, in Lima, at the age of 85.

=== Theory of Architecture ===
Malachowski wrote the book, Lessons of Elements and Theory Of Architecture with the intentions of putting all his teaching material into one place. He taught the course of Elements and Theory of Architecture at the Escuela Nacional de Ingenieros (National School of Engineering) in Lima between 1915 and 1944. This book is a substantial contribution to the theories and the Peruvian architectural thought. Containing 141 sketches, the first edition was published in 1944. As of today, it is only published in Spanish.

== Works ==
In addition to the buildings below, Malachowski also worked on a number of urban and preliminary designs of the buildings at the Paseo de la República Avenue, as well as of the Malecón de Miraflores.

Name	Year	Location	Notes	Photo
Caja de Depósitos y Consignaciones	1913	Jirón Huallaga 400	Currently serves as the Cultural Centre of the National Superior Autonomous School of Fine Arts.	
Residence of Augusto Wiese Eslava	1920	Paseo Colón	Currently serves as the Casa del Maestro.	
Teatro Municipal	1920	Jirón Ica	With Alfredo Viale, who designed and constructed the theatre.	
Casa Gonzales de Panizo	1922	Av. Nicolás de Piérola & Jr. Cañete	With Claude Sahut.	
Casa Dibos	1923	Av. Nicolás de Piérola & Jr. Cañete	With Claude Sahut. Also named after Victoria Larco de García.	
Residence of Carlos Palacios Villacampa	1923	Arequipa Avenue	Built to house the family of Carlos Palacios Villacampa and his wife Amelia Moreyra. The family moved to Chorrillos in the 1930s and the building was leased to Chile, who used it as an embassy until its purchase by Colombia years later. It currently serves as the residence of the Embassy of Colombia.	
Museo Nacional de la Cultura Peruana	1924	Av. Alfonso Ugarte 650	Formerly the National Archaeology Museum.	
Plaza Dos de Mayo	1924	Av. Colonial, Alfonso Ugarte & Nicolás de Piérola	The complex is made up of eight three-story buildings with a fourth floor with mansard roofs characteristic of French academicism.	
Edificio Rímac	1919–1924	Av. Roosevelt 101 y 157	First multi-family residence in the city.	
Palacio Arzobispal	1924	Jirón Carabaya	Façade; chosen among 16 proposals.	
Sociedad de Ingenieros	1924	Jr. Camaná & Av. Nicolás de Piérola	Built to house the society of the same name.	
Edificio Manuel Vicente Villarán	1924	Paseo Colón & Jr. Washington	Named after the jurist and politician.	
Compañía Peruana de Teléfonos	1929	Jirón Miró Quesada 159	Modernisation of the façade.	
Banco Italiano	1929	Jirón Lampa 801	The building, a property of the bank of the same name, was inaugurated on April 21, 1929, coinciding with both the 40th anniversary of the bank's creation and the founding of Rome.	
Club Nacional	1929	Jirón de la Unión 1016	Codesigned with Enrique Bianchi.	
Government Palace	1938	Jirón Junín	Started by Claude Sahut in 1926. Works stopped in 1932 and continued under Malachowski in 1937.	
Palacio Legislativo	1939	Plaza Bolívar	Built to house Congress.	
Iglesia Matriz de Miraflores	1939	Miraflores Central Park	Built to develop the area.	
Casa Suárez	1939	Arequipa Avenue	Replica of the Government Palace.	
Palacio Municipal	1944	Jirón de la Unión 300	José Álvarez Calderón and Emilio Harth Terré designed the building after winning a contest of the Ministry of Development, while Malachowski designed the interior.	

== See also ==
- Peruvian colonial architecture
