= Casa Suárez =

Cultural heritage site in Lima, Peru

Coordinates: 12°06′30″S 77°01′50″W

- Casona Suárez
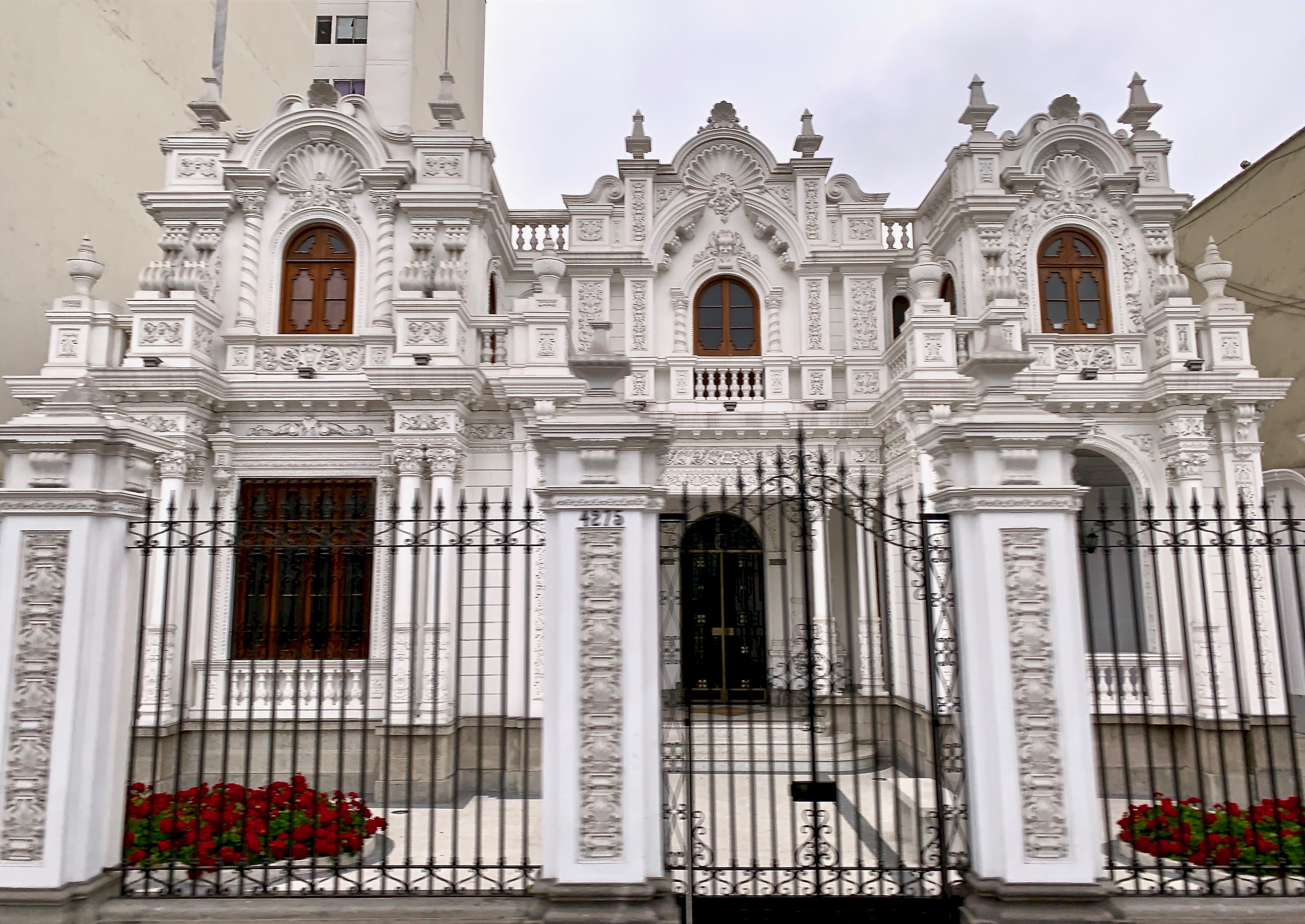
- Interactive map of the Casa Suárez area

General information
- Architectural style: Neo-Baroque
- Location: 4275 Arequipa Ave.
- Inaugurated: 1939
- Owner: Gay Suárez del Castillo

Design and construction
- Architect: Ricardo de Jaxa Malachowski

The Casa Suárez is a house located in the city of Lima, Peru. It was declared Cultural heritage of the Nation in May 2007.

== History ==
Its construction date is estimated at 1939 by the Polish architect Ricardo de Jaxa Malachowski under the auspices of Gay Suárez del Castillo, a doctor and congressman during the government of Manuel Prado, who hired him in 1932. The house was a reception place for political personalities of the time. Suárez lived in the home until his death on January 4, 1968.

In July 2016, the house was restored thanks to a conservation program of the Miraflores city council to rescue real estate of historical value. The investment was S/.400,000, and the work was supervised by members of the Ministry of Culture.

== Overview ==
The property is a neo-baroque family home located on the 42 Arequipa Ave. (formerly Leguía Ave.), in the Miraflores district. The particularity of its architecture is that its façade was inspired by the Government Palace of Peru.

It occupies an area of more than 1,300 m^{2}, and has 35 rooms, including the entrance hall, two main rooms, a dining room, central patio, and the chapel with an image of the Lord of Miracles.

== See also ==
- Government Palace, the inspiration of the house's façade.
- Historic Centre of Lima
