= Claude Sahut =

French architect (1883–1932)

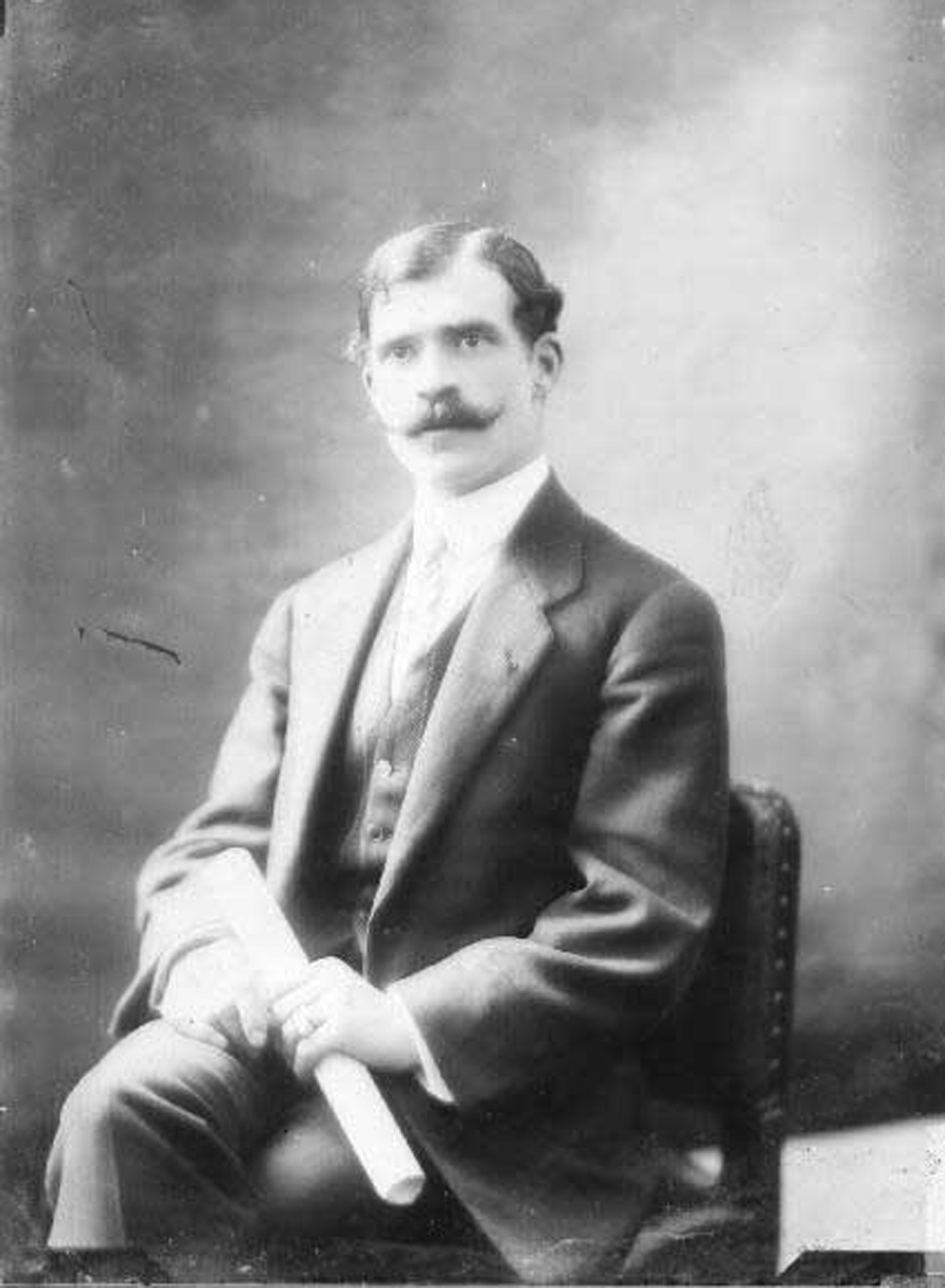
- Born: January 15, 1883; Montpellier, France
- Died: August 16, 1932 (aged 49); Montpellier, France
- Education: Beaux-Arts de Paris
- Occupation: Architect
- Years active: before 1912–1932

Claude Sahut (Montpellier; January 15, 1883 — August 16, 1932) was a French architect. Many of his works took place in the Peruvian city of Lima, including state-owned buildings, such as the Government Palace.

== Biography ==
Sahut studied at the École des Beaux-Arts in Paris, where he specialised in ornamentation and decoration within architecture.

He arrived in Peru in 1905, working as a furniture designer for the Magot Frères factory. In 1907, he was commissioned by the Peruvian government commissioned him to head the Public Works section of the Charity of Lima. Under the government of Augusto B. Leguía, he was the architect in charge of the design of the Parque de la Reserva and the redesign of the Government Palace, which Ricardo de Jaxa Malachowski completed in 1937. He returned to France in 1932.

== Notable works ==
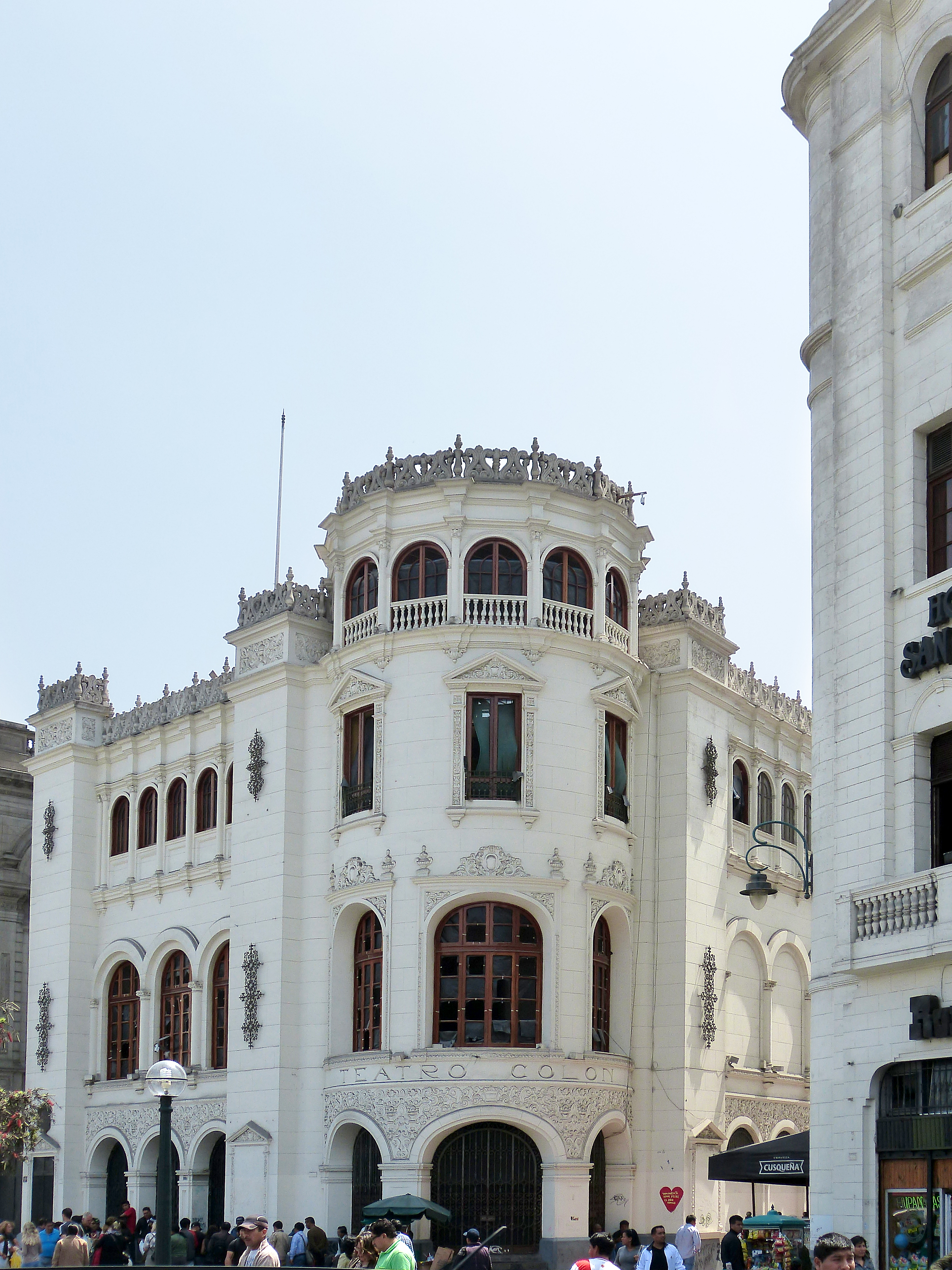
Teatro Colón (2012)

Sahut was responsible for a number of buildings in Lima, including:

- Casa Oechsle (1912, façade demolished 1950s)
- Teatro Colón (1912)
- Market of Chincha Alta (1913)
- Casa Fernandini (1913)
- Bolivarian Museum (1930)
- Piura Prison (1919)
- Archbishop's Palace (c. 1924)
- New Women's Hospital (1912)

== See also ==
- Ricardo de Jaxa Malachowski
