= Casa Fernandini, Lima =

Historical building in Lima, Peru

Coordinates: 12°02′42″S 77°02′06″W

Casa Fernandini
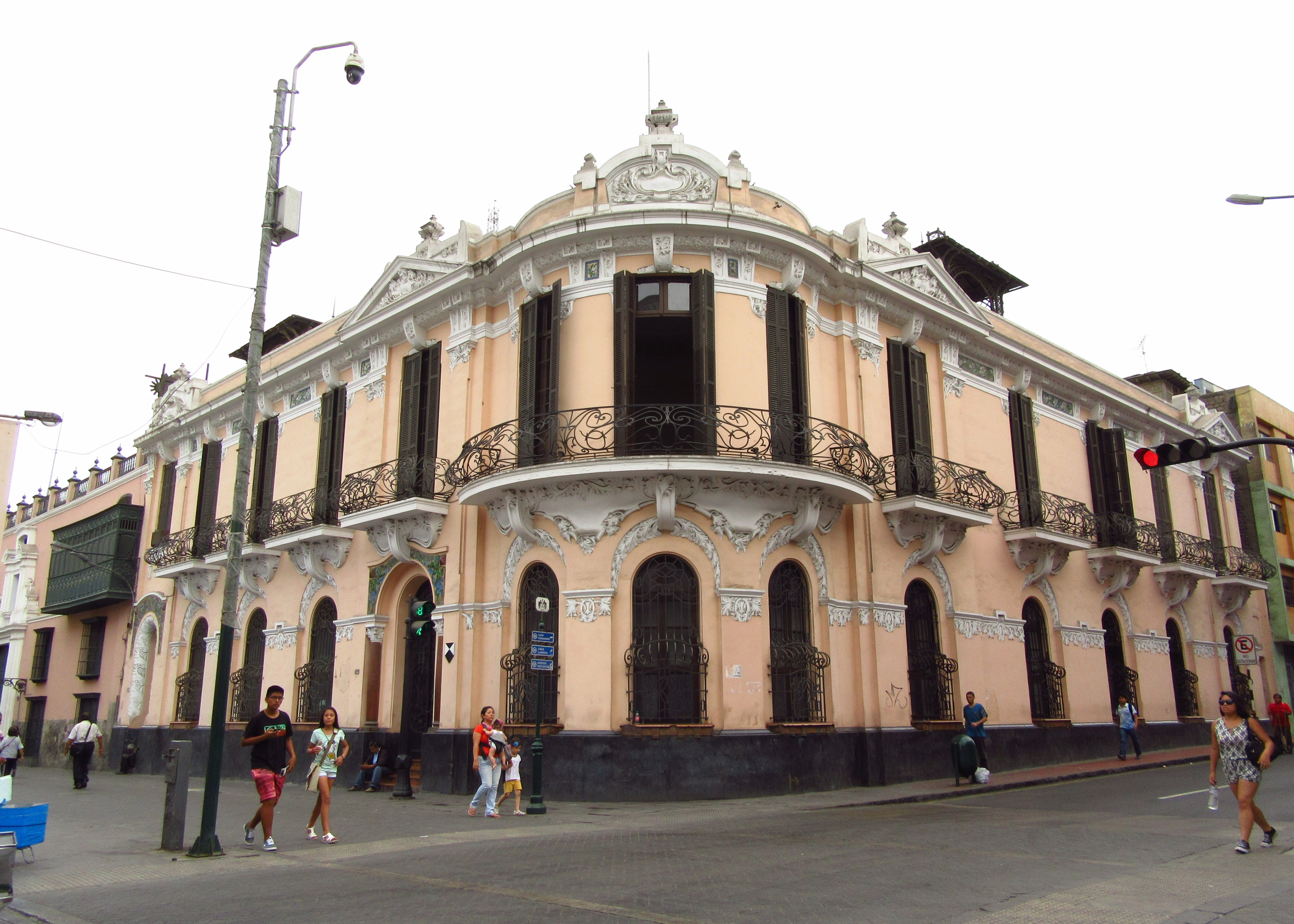

General information
- Architectural style: Eclectic, Rococo, Art Nouveau
- Address: Jirón Ica 400
- Year(s) built: 1912–1913

Technical details
- Floor count: 2

Design and construction
- Architect(s): Claude Sahut

The Casa Fernandini is a historic residence located in the historic centre of Lima, Peru. It was built in 1913 and is located at 400 Jirón Ica. It was designed by Claude Sahut in an eclectic style.

== History ==
The building was designed by Claude Sahut in an eclectic style for the miner Eulogio Fernandini and his family. Concrete and brick were used in its structure. Its distribution is structured around a large room covered by an iron and glass lamppost. Stylistically, it is an eclectic style building that mixes Rococo and Art Nouveau elements. The first style is expressed in rockeries and fretwork, and Art Nouveau in the design of the wooden carpentry and in the bars of the railings, windows and doors, as well as in the stained glass windows and streetlights.

The building is currently a House Museum where cultural activities take place regularly.

== Gallery ==
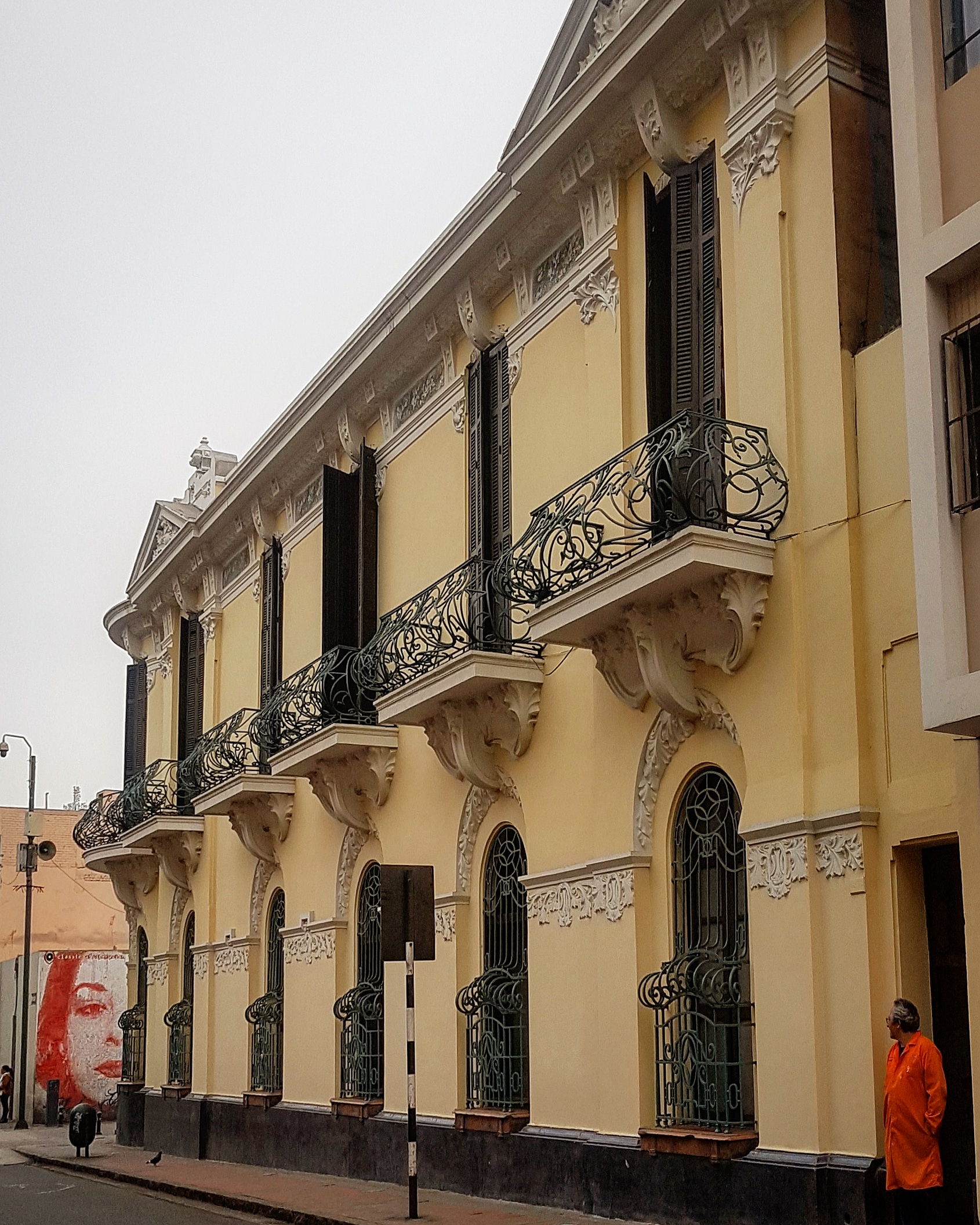
View from Jirón Rufino Torrico

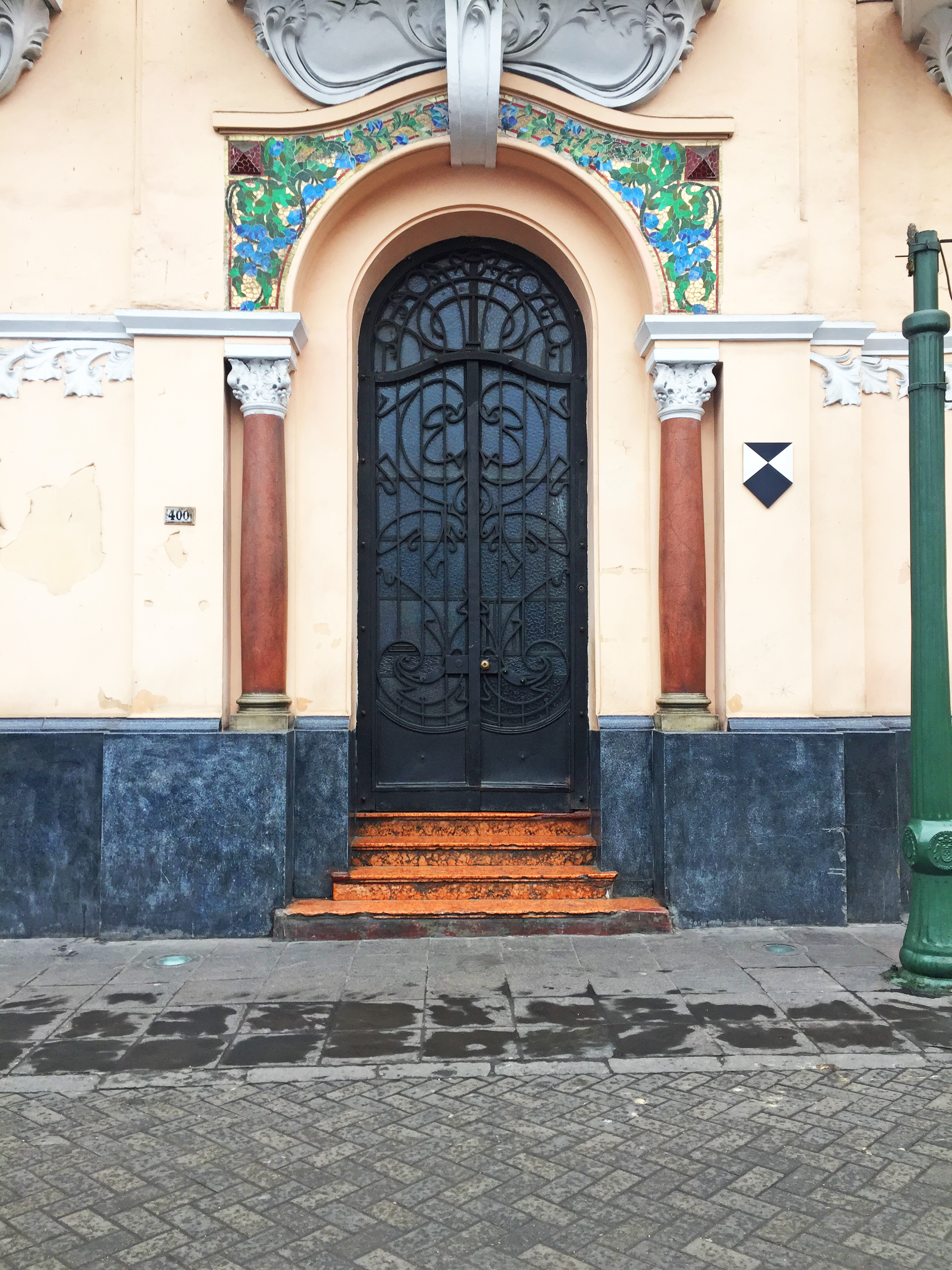
Side entrance

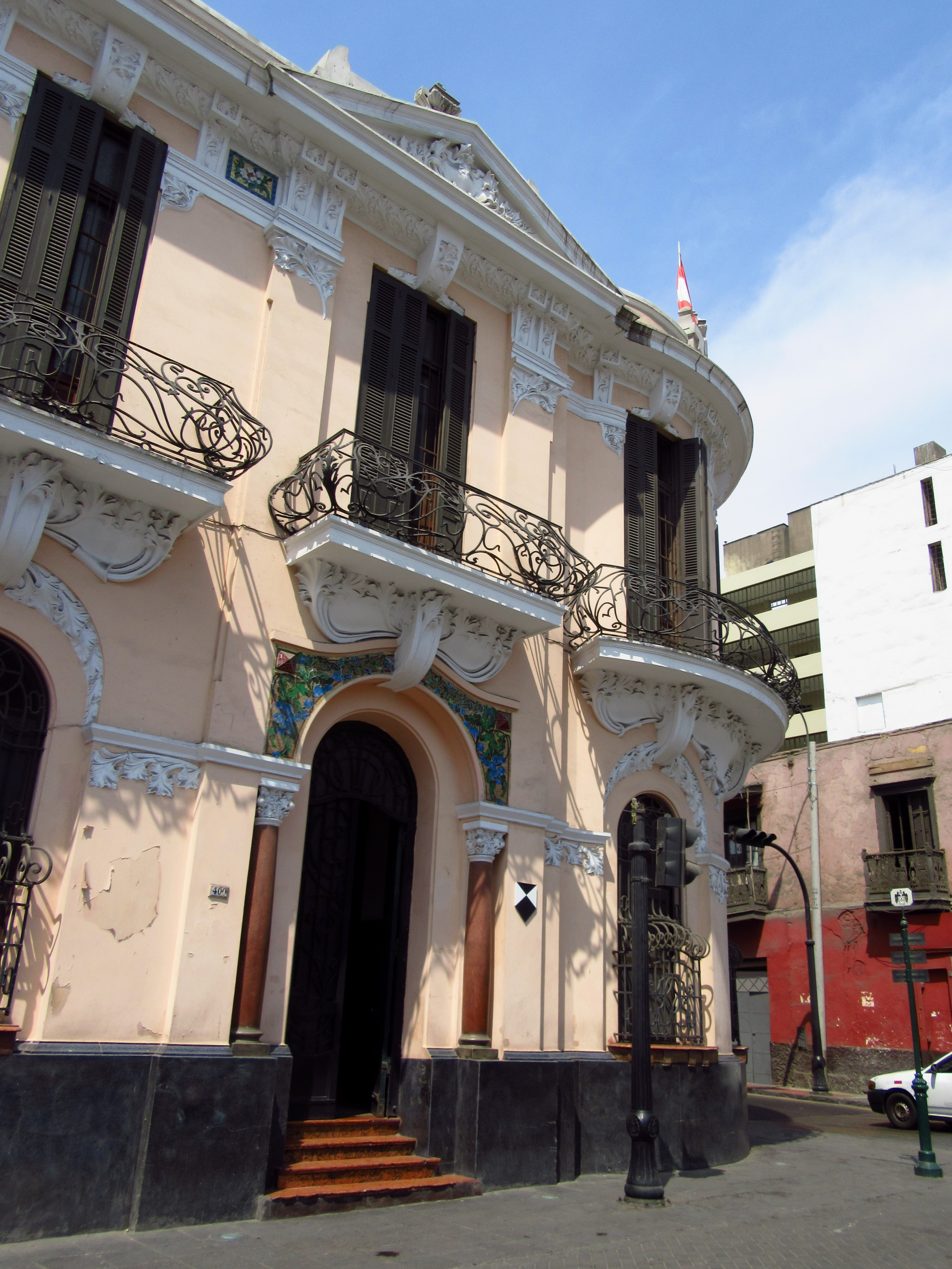
View from Jirón Ica

== See also ==
- Teatro Municipal de Lima, located across the street.
