= National Museum of Peruvian Culture =

Museum in Peru

Coordinates: 12.0479°S 77.0430°W

- Museo Nacional de la Cultura Peruana
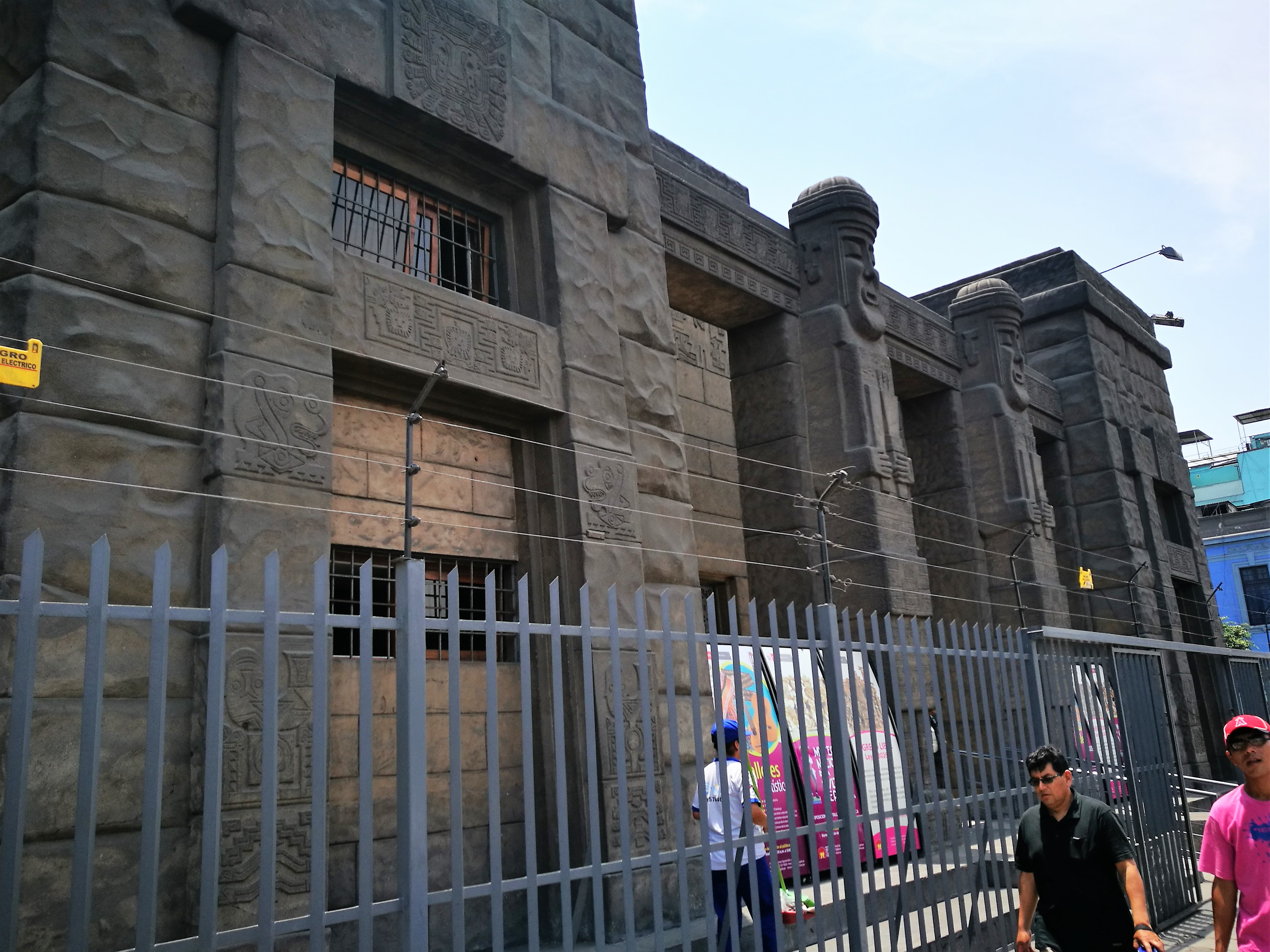
- Established: 30 March 1946
- Location: Lima District

The National Museum of Peruvian Culture (Spanish: Museo Nacional de la Cultura Peruana), formerly the National Archaeology Museum (Spanish: Museo de Arqueología Nacional), is a museum dedicated to Peruvian culture in Lima, Peru.

== History ==
It was founded on March 30, 1946, by the Peruvian historian, anthropologist and indigenist Luis E. Valcárcel. It houses 1,500 pieces, most of which date from the 20th century. The collection includes imagery from Cuzco, mates from Huanta and altarpieces from Ayacucho. It was designed in Neo-Inca style by architect Ricardo de Jaxa Malachowski.

The museum's predecessor, the Institute of Peruvian Art, was created in 1931 by Decree Law No. 7084 as an institute annexed to the Department of Anthropology of the National Museum, to promote the study of pre-Hispanic art and popular arts. The director of the institute was the painter José Sabogal and the person in charge of the drawn research area was Camilo Blas. The artists Julia Codesido, Alicia Bustamante, Enrique Camino Brent, Teresa Carvallo, Apu-Rimak and the photographer Abraham Guillén were also members and collaborators of the institute.

== See also ==
- Indigenismo
