= Church of San Agustín, Lima =

Church in Lima, Peru

Coordinates: 12.0466°S 77.0333°W

Basilica and Convent of San Agustín
- Basílica Menor y Convento de San Agustín
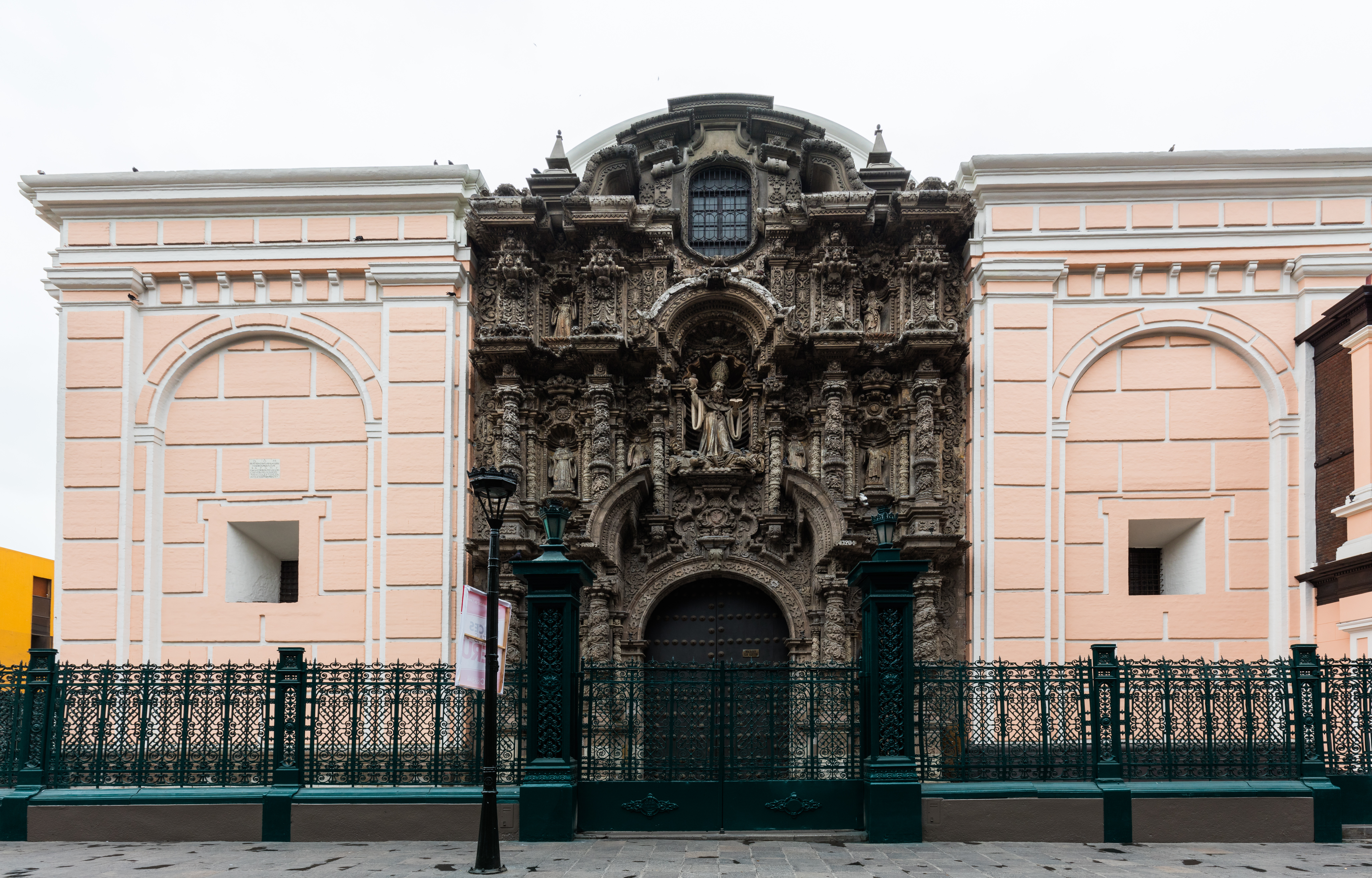

Religion
- Affiliation: Catholic
- Governing body: Archdiocese of Lima

Location
- Location: Jirón Ica 251, Lima
- Interactive map of Basilica and Convent of San Agustín

Architecture
- Style: Churrigueresque

The Basilica and Convent of San Agustín (Spanish: Basílica Menor y Convento de San Agustín) is a Catholic temple located at the junction of the fourth block of Jirón Camaná (Lartiga Street) with the second block of Jirón Ica (formerly San Agustin Street), a few blocks from the main square of the city of Lima, forming part of its historic centre.

Since its foundation, it has been run by the Augustinian friars, and belongs to the Augustinian order's Province of Our Lady of Grace of Peru. A square of the same name is located across the street.

== History ==
The church was established in 1573, but it has been rebuilt several times due to the earthquakes which have occurred in Lima, and also because of the extensions and the rugged Peruvian political life. One of the biggest events was the rebuilding of the church after the devastating 1746 Lima-Callao earthquake which caused significant damage to the structure. The building was restored in 1751.

The tower was demolished in 1908.

== Overview ==
The facade is a Churrigueresque baroque architectural design overlaid with ornaments, carved in stone. This was completed in 1710, consists of three blocks and three bodies, being the central street of the first body which houses the door through which enters the enclosure. On this one has a vertical arc cornice, be determinative feature original of Peruvian Baroque architecture. In the niches of the facade are ten images, in addition to one of St. Augustine in the center.

Its importance is that it is also one of the two Churrigueresque facades left in Lima, together the facade of the Basilica of La Merced. Only been the frontispiece and the side walls from the original church remain.

== See also ==
- Historic Centre of Lima
