= Obelisk to the Defenders of Democracy =

Monument in Lima, Peru

- Obelisco a los defensores de la democracia
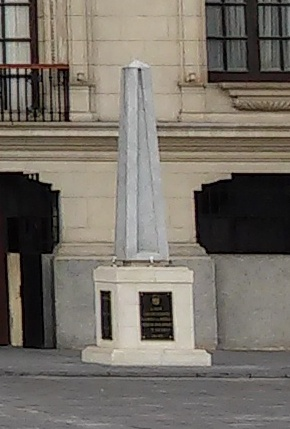
- 12.04515755°S 77.02986198°W
- Location: Government Palace, Peru
- Dedicated date: May 8, 2009
- Dedicated to: 4,357 Peruvians killed between 1980 and 2000

The Obelisk to the Defenders of Democracy (Spanish: Obelisco a los defensores de la democracia) is a monument located at the Patio of Honour, the main patio of Peru's Government Palace, located in the country's capital of Lima. Inaugurated in 2009, it is dedicated to all members of the Peruvian Armed Forces that were killed in action during the Peruvian conflict's main stage, which took place between 1980 and 2000.

== History ==
The monument was inaugurated in a ceremony that took place on May 8, 2009, by Alan García during his second term as president of Peru. Also attending the ceremony were Defence Minister Ántero Flores Aráoz, Interior Minister Mercedes Cabanillas and high-ranking members of the Armed Forces of Peru.

The monument was erected to honour 4,357 Peruvians identified as "defenders of democracy" who died fighting "terrorist lunacy" during the Peruvian conflict's main stage, which took place between the years 1980 and 2000. The number includes 1,513 political authorities and leaders, and members of the Rondas campesinas; 1,397 members of the National Police, 1,307 members of the Peruvian Army, 127 of the Peruvian Navy and 13 of the Peruvian Air Force.

The obelisk features an eternal flame.

Similarly, a park of the same name was built in Salaverry Avenue, next to Heroes of Independence Park in Jesús María.

== See also ==
- Government Palace, Peru
- The Eye that Cries
