= St. Sebastian's Church, Lima =

Church in Lima, Peru

Coordinates: 12.0438°S 77.0366°W

St. Sebastian's Church
- Iglesia de San Sebastián
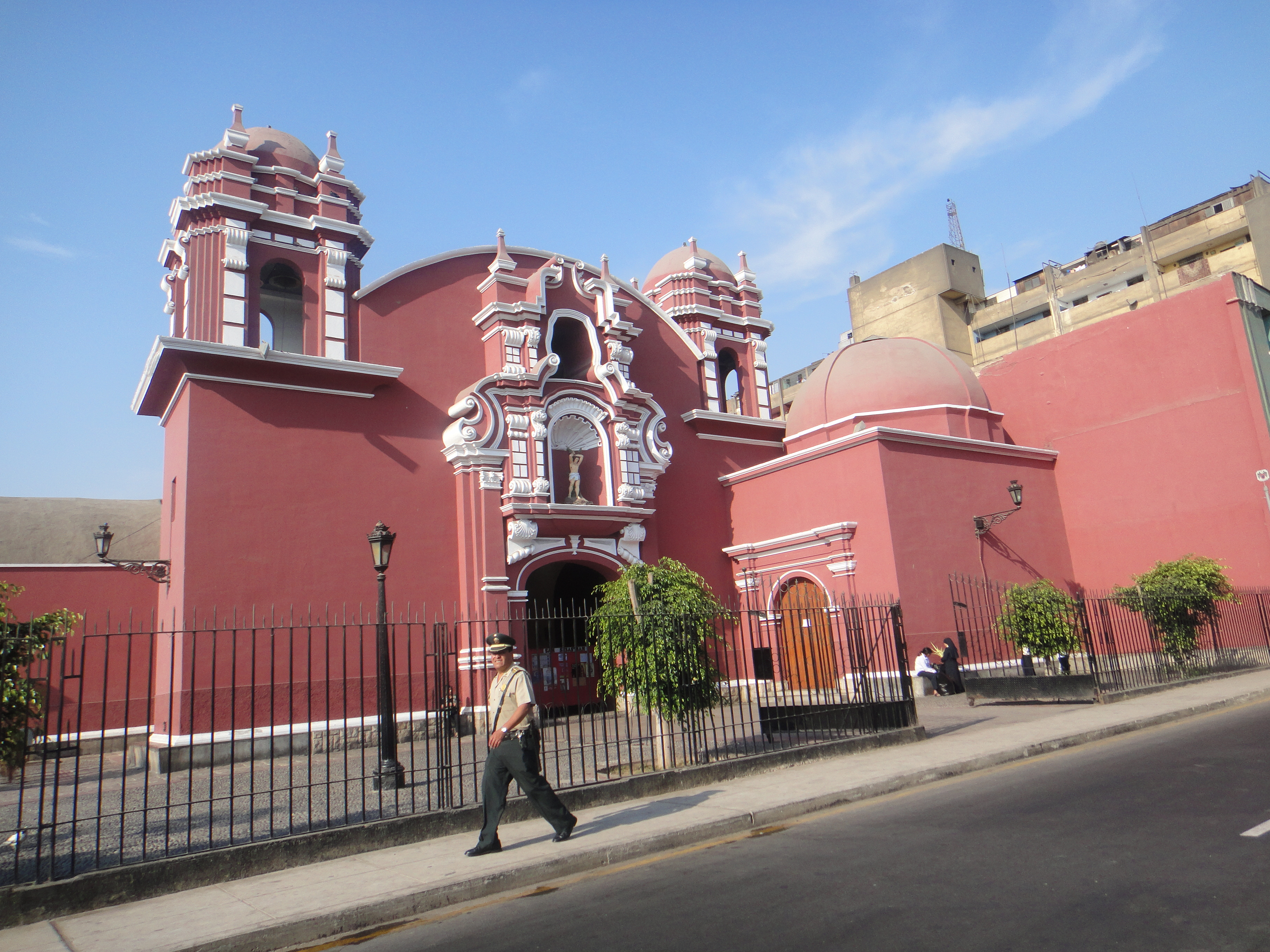
- The church in 2011

Religion
- Affiliation: Catholic
- Governing body: Archdiocese of Lima

Location
- Location: Historic Centre of Lima
- Interactive map of St. Sebastian's Church

Architecture
- Style: Rococo

St. Sebastian's Church (Spanish: Iglesia de San Sebastián) is a Catholic church in the historic centre of Lima in the corners of Ica and Chancay streets, one block from Tacna Avenue, in the old neighbourhood of Monserrate (then Cuartel Primero). Its pink and white front faces Jirón Ica. In antiquity, it is the third parish in Lima founded in 1554; It was preceded by the Tabernacle, in 1535, and Santa Ana, in 1550.

== History ==
The layout of the temple is incorrectly attributed to Francisco Becerra (1545-1605), architect or builder from Extremadura, native of Trujillo, Spain. This artist only arrived in Lima in the year 1582, 28 years later.

Its most valuable element is the main altarpiece, which dates back to the 18th century, which was restored with the support of Spanish cooperation. On the balcony of the parish the only “crow's foot” that served as the lamp used as an element of public lighting is preserved.

The parish house of San Sebastián is a small and modest building, but it forms a unit with the church and plays an important urban function as a closing element of the square. The square still preserves its old fountain that illuminates the complex, since 1888.

This church witnessed the baptism of Rose of Lima, Martín de Porres, Francisco Bolognesi, José Santos Chocano, José María Eguren and other illustrious people from Lima.

== See also ==
- Historic Centre of Lima
