= Jirón Ica =

Street in Lima, Peru

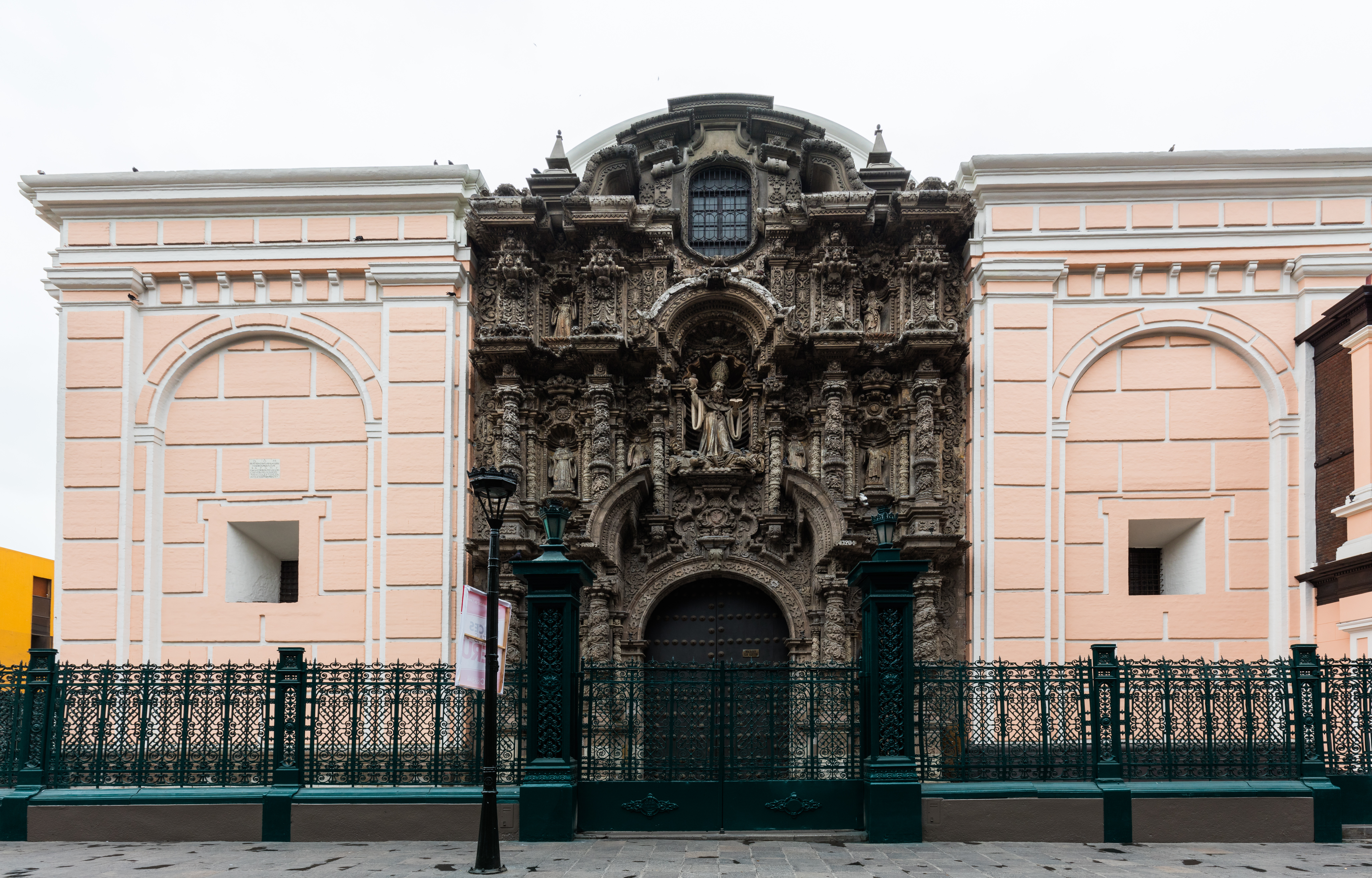
- Church of San Agustín at the second block
- Part of: Damero de Pizarro
- Namesake: Department of Ica
- From: Jirón de la Unión
- To: Jirón Sancho Rivera

Construction
- Completion: 1535

Ica Street (Spanish: Jirón Ica) is a major street in the Damero de Pizarro, located in the historic centre of Lima, Peru. The street starts at its intersection with the Jirón de la Unión and continues until it reaches the Jirón Sancho Rivera.

== History ==
The road that today constitutes the street was laid by Francisco Pizarro when he founded the city of Lima on January 18, 1535. In 1862, when a new urban nomenclature was adopted, the road was named jirón Ica, after the department of Ica. Prior to this renaming, each block (cuadra) had a unique name:

- Block 1: Plateros de San Agustín, after the large number of silverware shops there.
- Block 2: San Agustín/Comedia Vieja, after the church of the same name and a Corral de comedias that existed in front of it, respectively.
- Block 3: Concha, after the family of the same name. The Teatro Municipal de Lima is located here.
- Block 4: La Riva, after Vicente de la Riva y San Cristóbal, who lived there. The Casa Fernandini is located here.
- Block 5: San Sebastián, after the church of the same name.
- Block 6: Orejuelas, after the family of the same name.
- Block 7: Chávez (de San Sebastián), for reasons unknown.
- Block 8: Medalla, for reasons unknown.
- Block 9: Molino (de Monserrate), after a windmill near the convent of Monserrate street.

The former Broggi brothers' confectionery was located on the street. Originally owned by the Charity of Lima, it belonged to the Swiss-Italian Broggi brothers, of which Pedro had initially founded it in 1858, but it was only in the 1870s that it became the meeting place for a number of artists, intellectuals and other important people from the city. The Sociedad de Beneficencia Helvetia (today the Club Suizo) and the Rotary Club de Lima's first meetings took place in the building. Regulars at the place included painter Felipe Sassone, writer Enrique A. Carrillo and painter Luis Astete y Concha. Painter Pancho Fierro had a workshop inside the building, where journalist Ismael Portal met him in 1879.

Also located in the street is the Edificio Zevallos, the work of Augusto Benavides Diez Canseco after being commissioned by the property's owner Elena Zevallos Dávila in 1926. It had originally been the property of the Monastery of the Holy Trinity since colonial times.

The Casona Pancho Fierro, named after the painter, is located on the second block of the street. In 2018, a fire broke out and destroyed 80% of the property. Villa Chicken, the restaurant chain that operated in the building, was able to fund its reconstruction.

== See also ==
- Historic Centre of Lima
