= Bernardo de Monteagudo =

South American political activist (1789–1825)

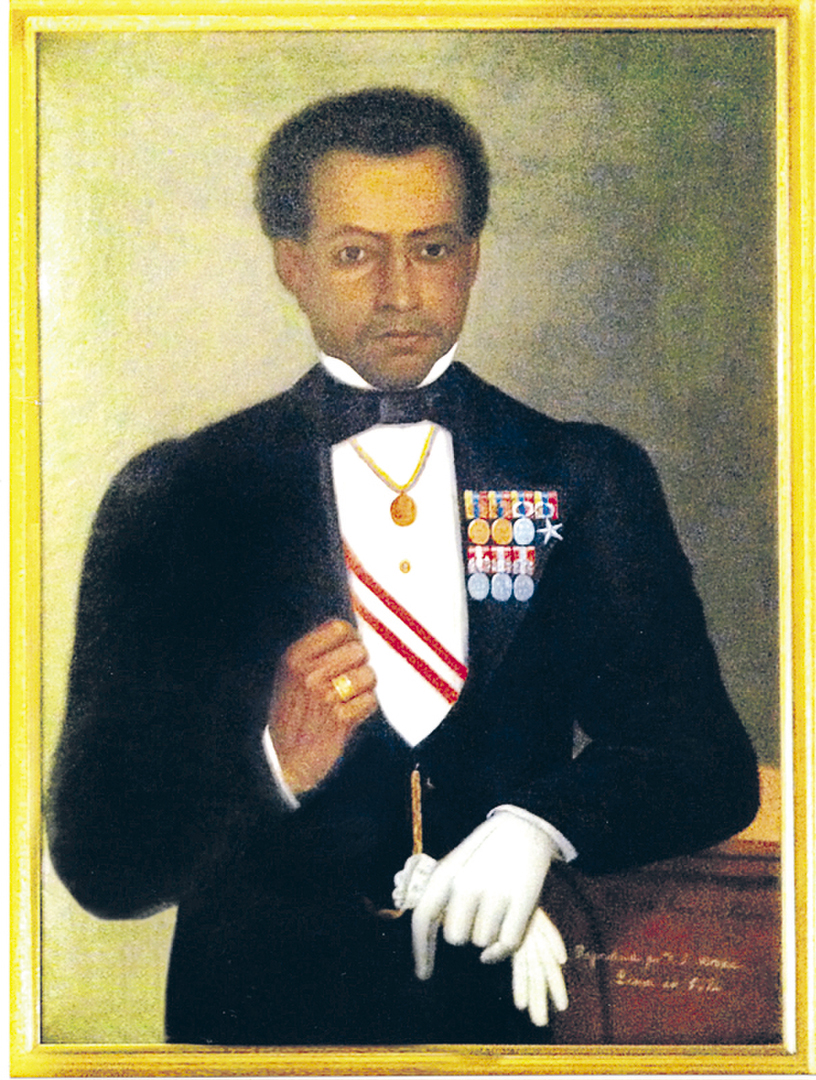
- 1876 portrait

Minister of Government and Foreign Affairs of Peru
- In office October 25, 1821 – July 26, 1822
- Preceded by: Juan García del Río
- Succeeded by: Francisco Valdivieso y Prada

Personal details
- Born: August 20, 1789 San Miguel de Tucumán
- Died: January 20, 1825 (aged 35) Lima
- Cause of death: Assassination
- Resting place: Cementerio del Oeste
- Citizenship: Argentina
- Education: University of San Francisco Xavier
- Occupation: Lawyer, politician, journalist

Bernardo José de Monteagudo y Cáceres (1789–1825) was a political activist and revolutionary. He took part in the liberation struggles against the Spanish Empire in South America, particularly in Argentina.

He was born in Tucumán in Argentina, and was assassinated in Lima, Perú.

He was most likely of mixed race, with ancestry which included African slaves. He was a key figure in the presence of Afrodescendants in the 18th and 19th centuries.

== Early life ==
His father was Miguel Monteagudo, a Spaniard, and his mother Catalina Cáceres Bramajo, a woman from Tucumán. Some historians support the idea that his mother was the slave of a canon, and that later she married a soldier of Spanish origin who set up a grocery store with which he paid for his stepson's law degree. As an adult, his political enemies sought to discriminate against him using the criteria established in the Spanish colonies by the Statutes of blood cleansing, maintaining that his mother descended from indigenous or African slaves and applying the qualifiers "zambo" or "mulatto" .

He was the only survivor of eleven children and spent his childhood in relative economic scarcity: when he died, after spending his fortune helping his son, his father owned a grocery store and a slave. He studied law in Córdoba.

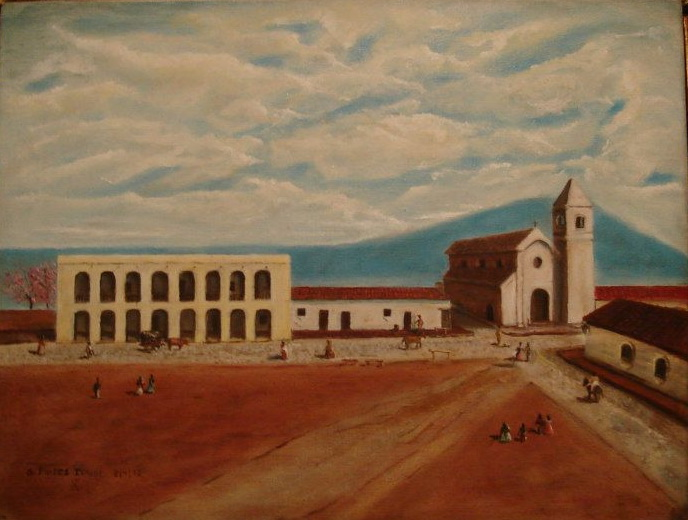
Tucumán at the time of the war of independence

== In Upper Peru ==
Recommended by a priest friend of his father's, he entered the University of Chuquisaca, where he graduated in law in 1808, and began to practice as a defender of the poor.

That same year, when the French invasion of Napoleon bonaparte to Spain became known, Monteagudo wrote a play entitled Dialogue between Atahualpa and Fernando VII. In the same Monteagudo he recreated an imaginary conversation between Atahualpa, the last monarch of the Inca Empire assassinated by the Spanish invaders, and Fernando VII, deposed from the Spanish Crown by the French invaders. In this work, Monteagudo, barely eighteen years old, formulated the famous Chuquisaca syllogism:

"Should the fate of Spain be followed or resisted in America? The Indies are a personal territory of the King of Spain; the King is prevented from ruling; then the Indies must rule themselves."

Bernardo de Monteagudo, Dialogue between Atahualpa and Fernando VII, 1808

== In Argentina ==
Monteagudo arrived in Buenos Aires in 1811, after the death of Mariano Moreno and the Revolution of 5 and 6 April 1811, which separated the radical wing of the May Revolution from the government, securing the power of the conservative wing led by Saavedra. He assumed the defense of several of the defendants, including Castelli, in the trial to seek responsibility for the defeat of Huaqui. He was editor of the newspaper La Gazeta de Buenos-Ayres, alternating with Vicente Pazos Silva, who soon became his enemy and accused him of a "heretical pious" . He influenced on the drafting of the Provisional Statute by which the government should be governed until the meeting of the General Constituent Assembly, the first constitutional norm issued in the sphere of the American Southern Cone.

He defended the Morenista policy of maintaining a permanent action of vigilance and suspicion on the peninsular Spaniards.. In 1812, during the government of the First Triumvirate, he supported the complaint and investigation of the minister Bernardino Rivadavia about a conspiracy against the government headed by the merchant and former Spanish activist Martín de Álzaga.

== In Chile, Mendoza and San Luis ==
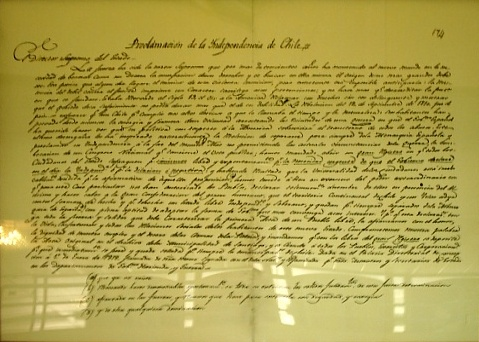
Act of Proclamation of the Independence of Chile, attributed to Monteagudo, although the authorship is also disputed by Miguel Zañartu.

In 1817, a few days after the Battle of Chacabuco, he crossed the Andes Mountains and placed himself under José de San Martín as auditor of the Army of the Andes. In January 1818 he wrote the Proclamation of the Independence of Chile (the writing was disputed with Miguel de Zañartu), and he became a confidant and advisor to the director Bernardo O'Higgins, also a member of the Lautaro Lodge.

In the dismay generated by the Cancha Rayada Surprise, he returned to Mendoza to reorganize the forces, which by the way the Chilean historiography interprets as an act of cowardice typical of his condition as a man of letters and not of arms; Once there he learned that the Army of the Andes had reorganized, and that San Martín and O'Higgins were still alive. After the patriot victory in the Battle of Maipú, he was involved in the summary execution of the brothers Juan José and Luis Carrera, and probably also in the murder of Manuel Rodríguez Erdoíza, after being detained by O'Higgins. The Carreras and Rodríguez were members of a pro-independence current that was directly opposed to San Martín and O'Higgins.

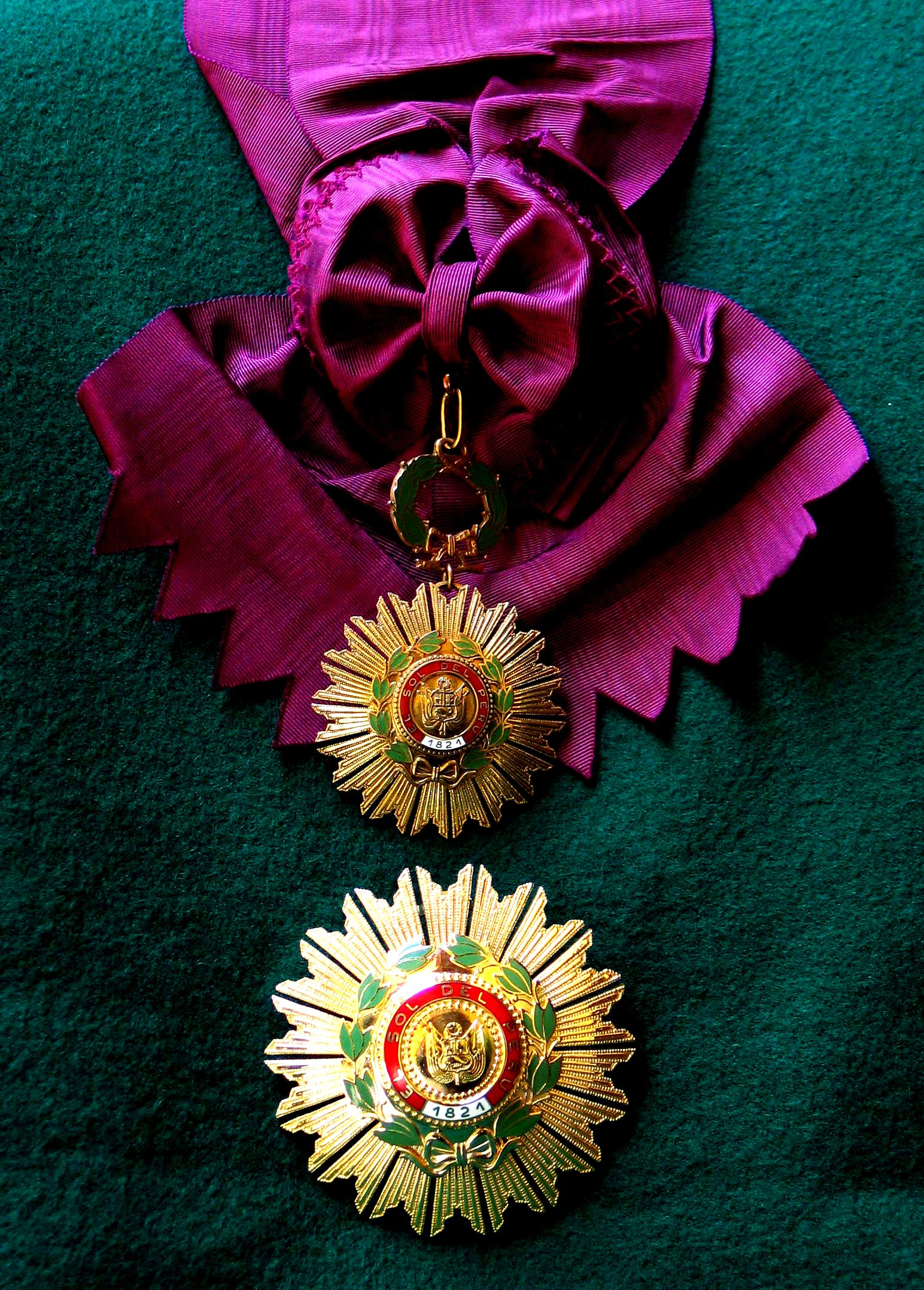
The Order of the Sun is a distinction awarded by Peru.

== In Peru ==
In 1821 Monteagudo joined the liberating expedition under the command of San Martín as auditor of the Argentine army in Peru, replacing the recently deceased Antonio Álvarez Jonte. His first success was to convince the governor of Trujillo to go over to the patriots: he was the Marquis of Torre Tagle, future first Peruvian president (with the title of Supreme Delegate) of Peru.

On 28 July 1821, San Martín proclaimed the independence of Peru from Lima, to assume as Supreme Protector on 3 August. Monteagudo became the right hand in the government. He, later, assumed the positions of Minister of War and Navy and then, also taking charge of the Ministry of Government and Foreign Relations. While San Martín concentrated on the military aspects giving priority to the war, Monteagudo was in fact in charge of the government of Peru in all but name, even if the title of Supreme Delegate was hold by the Marquis of Torre Tagle. Monteagudo's radical policies were quite unpopular among Lima's aristocracy, leading to his dismissal when Tagle came under pressure from members of the local council or Cabildo. A weak Tagle was forced to concede, and on 25 July 1822, he discharged Monteagudo, who went into exile. The Congress of Peru later banned him from returning to the country.

== Panama, Ecuador and Guatemala ==
On 28 November 1821, the neighbors of Panama proclaimed in an open town hall the independence of the Isthmus of Panama from the Spanish crown. They decided that it should be part of Gran Colombia. A few months later, Monteagudo arrived. Tagle had entrusted his fate to the patriot governor José María Carreño, who in turn placed him in the custody of Lieutenant Colonel Francisco Burdett O'Connor, then Panama's chief of staff, with whom he established a friendly relationship. From Panama Monteagudo began to write to the liberator Simón Bolívar, who finally invited him to join him in Ecuador.

The meeting between Bolívar and Monteagudo finally took place in Ibarra, shortly after the fierce Battle of Ibarra on 10 July 1823, which liberated the north of present-day Ecuador. Bolívar was pleasantly impressed with Monteagudo, especially by his ability to work, and commissioned him to travel to Mexico to obtain funds.

The trip was finally suspended, since in Bogotá another representative had already been legally and officially elected for this task. In addition to the fact that Bolívar did not have the powers to do so, since the executive power had been entrusted to Francisco de Paula Santander and the Liberator only possessed military powers.

Monteagudo then decided to travel to the United Provinces of Central America, which at that time included all the current Central American countries( Guatemala, Belize, Honduras, El Salvador, Nicaragua and Costa Rica) and Chiapas, with the exception of Panama.

In Guatemala City, Monteagudo met with José Cecilio del Valle, president of the United Provinces of Central America, with whom he shared an Americanist vision of the independence process and that he had launched the idea of organizing a continental Congress to deal with the common problems of the nations’ independence from Spain and to establish the foundations of a new American international law.

== Return to Peru and efforts to establish Hispanic American Federation ==
Despite the validity of the legislative resolution that ordered the ban, Monteagudo returned to Peru through Trujillo and accompanied Bolívar with the rank of colonel in the final campaign of the Peruvian War of Independence. He entered Lima, after the victory in the battle of Ayacucho on 9 December 1824.

By that time Monteagudo had developed an Americanist vision of independence. He was part of the independence revolution of the Río de la Plata, Chile and Peru. He also visited the new independent nations of Panama and Central America. This led him to the belief that all Hispanic America should be a single nation.

== Assassination ==
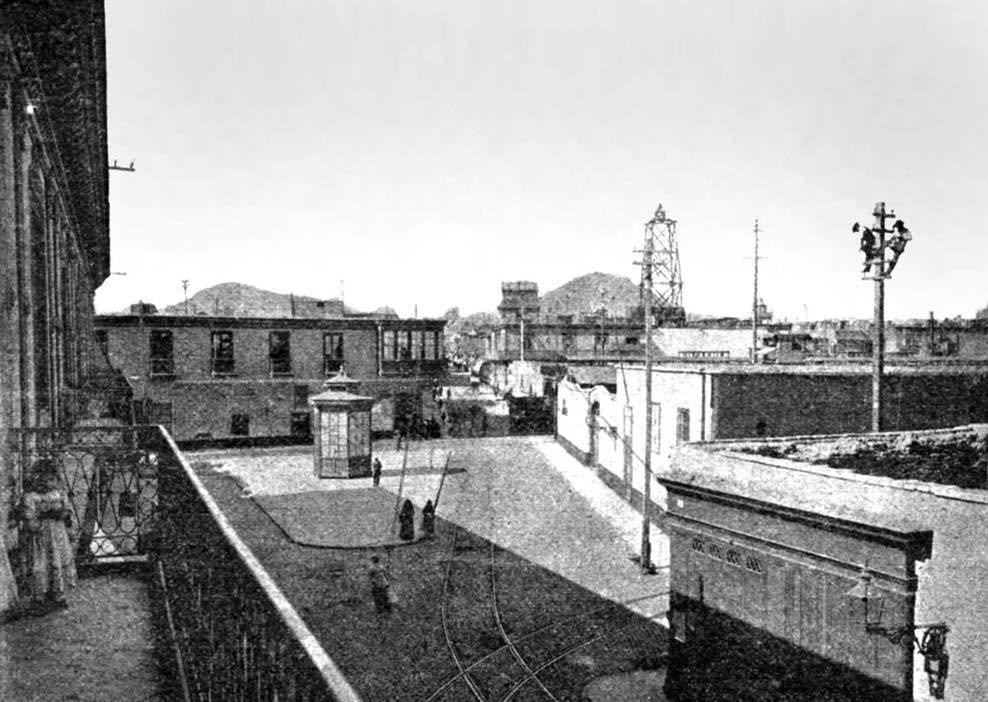
1898 photograph of Micheo Square in Lima, where Monteagudo was assassinated.

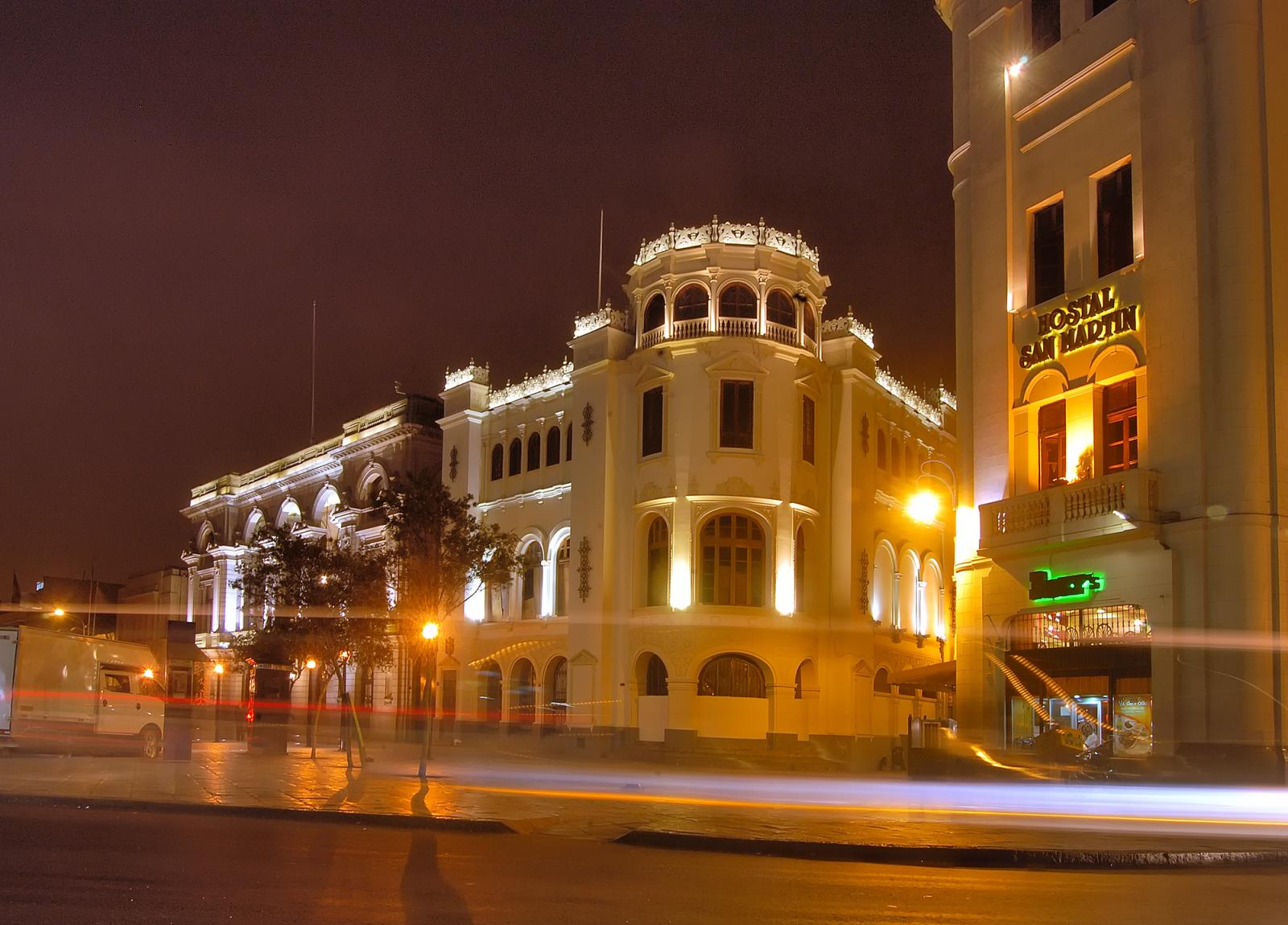
The square's surroundings were replaced by the buildings in this photograph.

At around 8 p.m. of the night of 28 January 1825, Monteagudo was walking from his home in Lima (Note: Located on Santo Domingo street, now the second block of Jirón Conde de Superunda.) to Juana Salguero's house when he was stabbed to death, at the age of thirty-five. (Note: The crime occurred in the Plazoleta de la Micheo, located at the northern end of the then Belén street, 10th block from the current Jirón de la Unión, one of the main streets of Lima at the time. (Note: In front of the south wing of the already demolished hospital and convent of San Juan de Dios. The square and the path where he used no longer exist, but the exact point of his death is located in front of the southwest corner of Plaza San Martín, at the point where the Quilca passage, the Colmena avenue and the Jirón de la Unión, in front of the Giacoletti Building and the Teatro Colón meet.))
