= Jirón Quilca =

Street in Lima, Peru

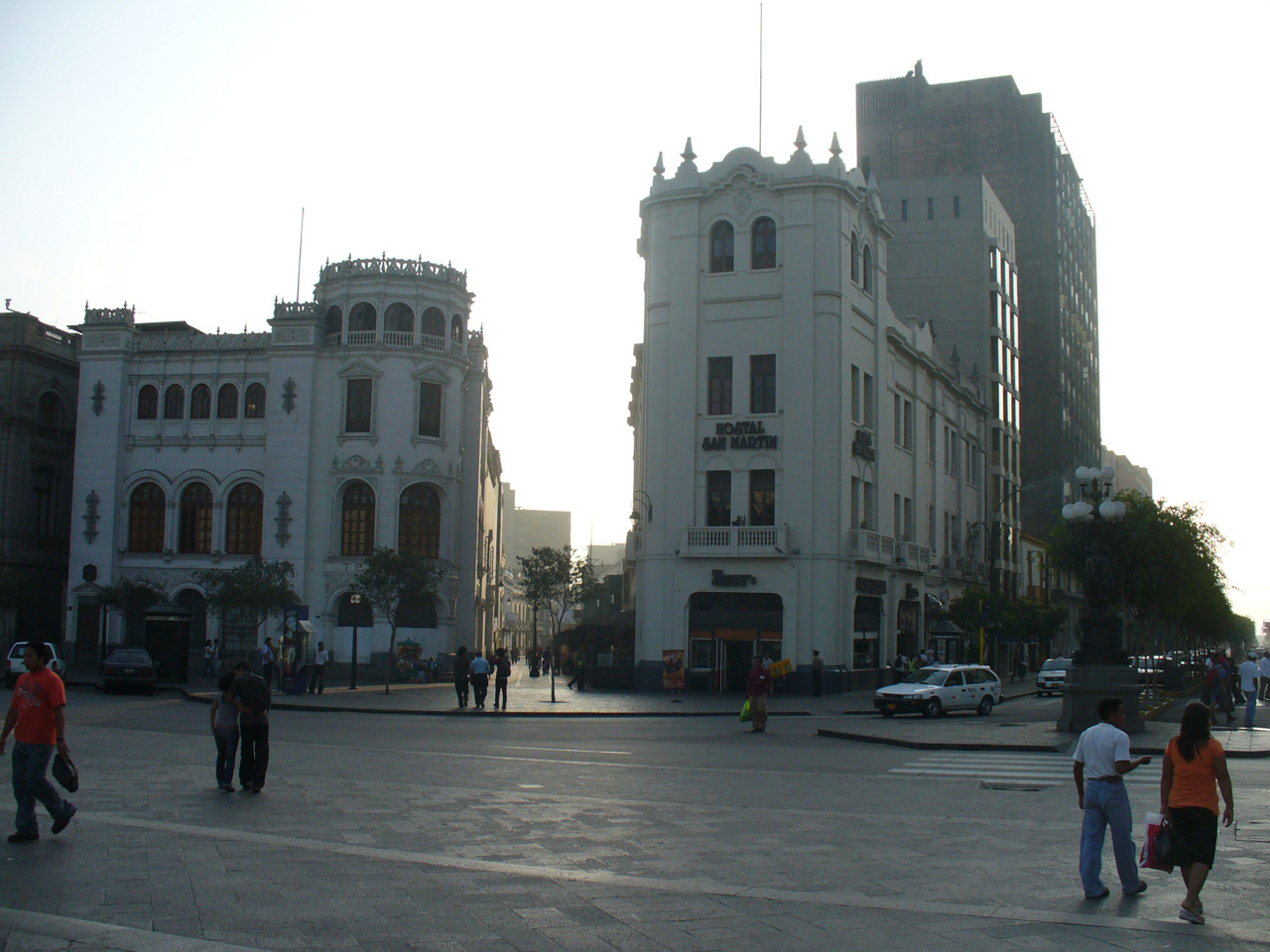
- View from the Plaza San Martín, between the Teatro Colón and the Giacoletti Building
- Part of: Damero de Pizarro
- Namesake: Quilca District
- From: Jirón de la Unión
- Major junctions: Jirón Camaná, Jirón Caylloma, Jirón Rufino Torrico, Wilson Avenue, Jirón Washington
- To: Alfonso Ugarte Avenue

Construction
- Completed: 1535

Jirón Quilca is a major street in the Damero de Pizarro, located in the historic centre of Lima, Peru. The street starts at its intersection with the Jirón de la Unión and continues until it reaches Alfonso Ugarte Avenue.

== History ==
This street is part of the city of Lima, founded by Francisco Pizarro on January 18, 1535. The street followed the path of an old section of the Inca road system, or Qhapaq Ñan. At first, it had only three blocks.

In 1862, when a new urban nomenclature was adopted, the road was named jirón Quilca, after the district in Camaná Province, Arequipa. Prior to this renaming, each block (cuadra) had a unique name:

- Block 1: Iturrizaga, after Bernardo de Iturrizara y Mansilla.
- Block 2: San Jacinto, after the chapel of the same name that existed in the 17th century. In 1857, the first gas factory for public lighting was built in this area.
- Block 3: Alfareros, after the various clay article making shops that existed during the viceroyalty.

During the economic crisis of the 1980s, both Quilca and Camaná streets became known for their book stores, which sold second-hand books and music cassettes at an affordable price. The leasing contract between these stores and the Archdiocese of Lima, effective since 1997, expired in 2016. A known place is the Bar Queirolo, a restaurant on the street's corner with Camaná.

On the second block, another well-known and popular bar is Don Lucho. In July 2026, a commemorative plaque was placed in recognition of Jirón Quilca as part of the Qhapaq Ñan.

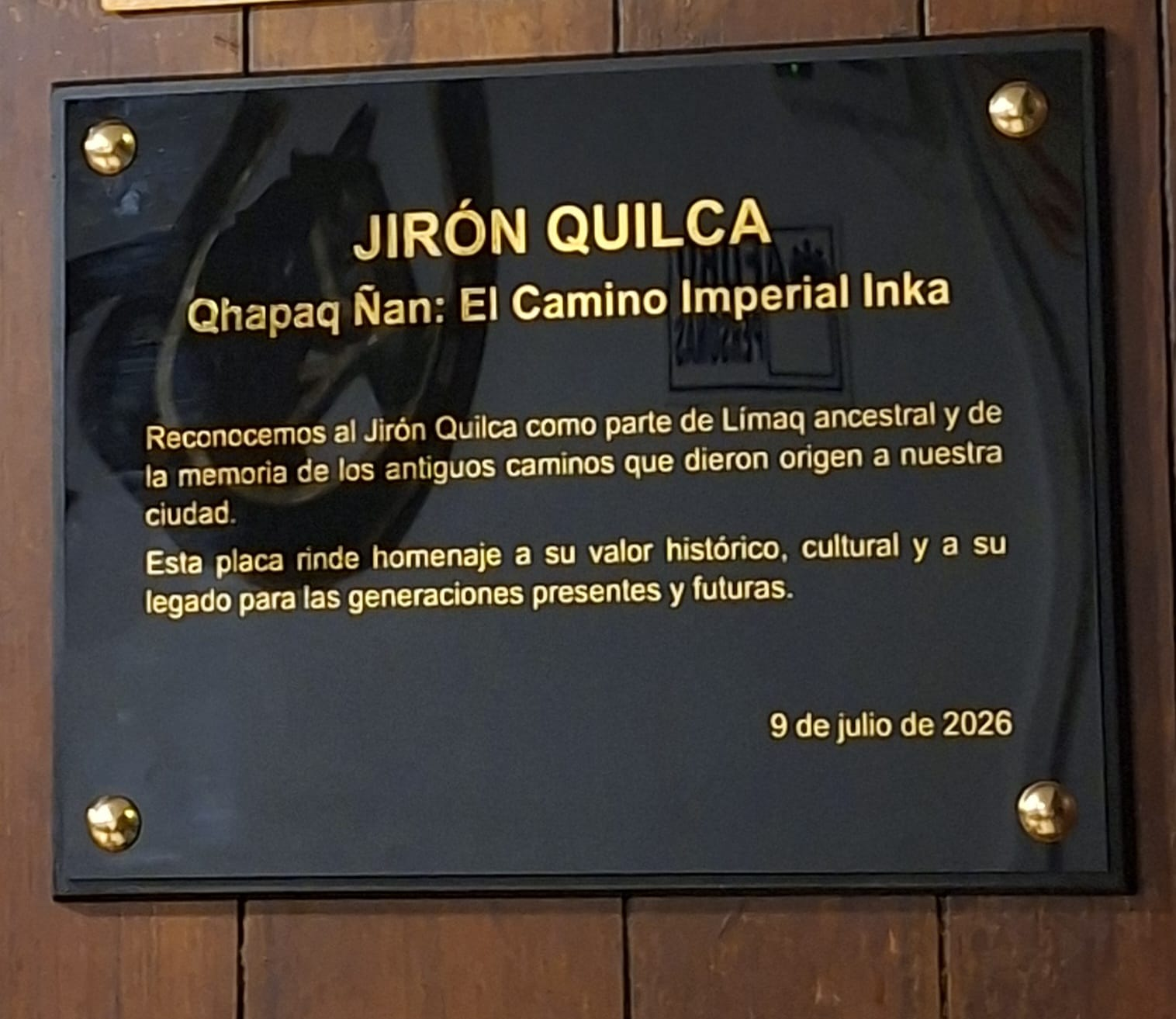

In the early morning of October 27, 2018, the Giacoletti Building, located on the street's first block, was damaged by a fire that lasted three hours. The building has remained empty since, still in a dilapidated state and without final demolition or reconstruction due to bureaucratic obstacles and financing problems. Currently, only the outer part of the building remains, although plans to rebuild it have been proposed.

== See also ==
- Historic Centre of Lima
