= Jirón Ocoña =

Street in Lima, Peru

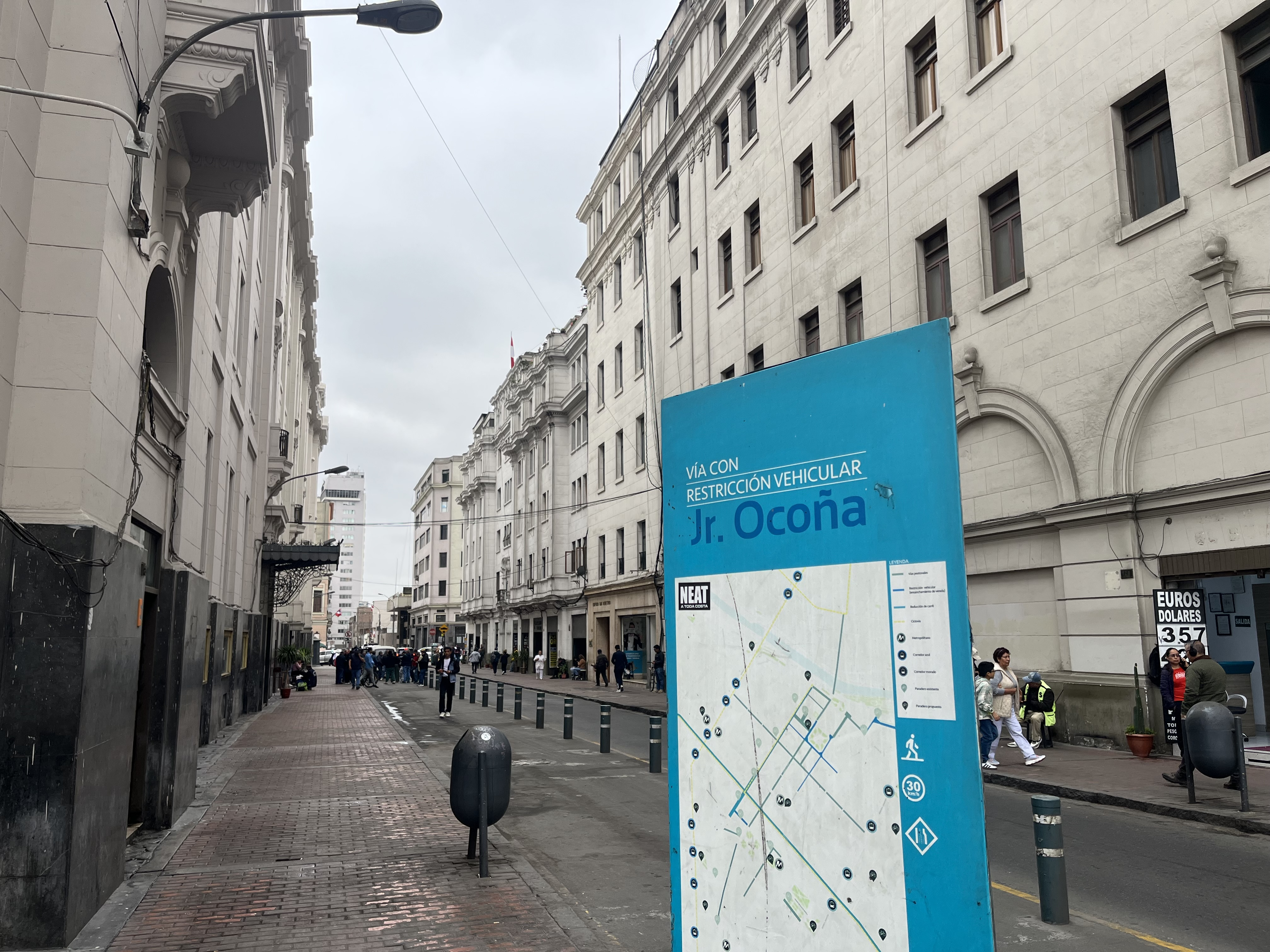
- View from next to the Gran Hotel Bolívar
- Interactive map of Jirón Ocoña
- Part of: Damero de Pizarro
- Namesake: Ocoña District
- From: Jirón de la Unión
- Major junctions: Jirón Camaná, Jirón Caylloma, Jirón Rufino Torrico
- To: Tacna Avenue

Construction
- Completion: 1535

Ocoña Street (Spanish: Jirón Ocoña) is a major street in the Damero de Pizarro, located in the historic centre of Lima, Peru. The street starts at its intersection with the Jirón de la Unión and continues until it reaches Tacna Avenue.

== History ==
The road that today constitutes the street was laid by Francisco Pizarro when he founded the city of Lima on January 18, 1535. In 1862, when a new urban nomenclature was adopted, the road was named jirón Ocoña, after the district of Camaná Province, in Arequipa. Prior to this renaming, each block (cuadra) had a unique name:

- Block 1: Matajudios, after a farm owned by an influential family with the surname Matamoros in the 17th century.
- Block 2: Pilitricas, for reasons not known.
- Block 3: Ibarrola, after alférez Domingo de Ibarrola, who was Mayor of Callao in the 18th century.

During the first presidency of Alan García, when the Dólar MUC was instituted and high inflation combined with freedom of exchange made the purchase and sale of the U.S. dollar a profitable business, the Jirón Ocoña brought together a large number of money changers and currency exchange houses, causing it to be nicknamed the "little Wall Street of Lima."

== See also ==
- Historic Centre of Lima
