= Caylloma =

Caylloma may refer to:

- Caylloma Province, a province of Peru
- Caylloma District, a district in the Caylloma Province of Peru
- Jirón Caylloma, a street in Lima, Peru
