= Casa O'Higgins =

Historical building in Peru

Coordinates: 12°02′51″S 77°01′57″W

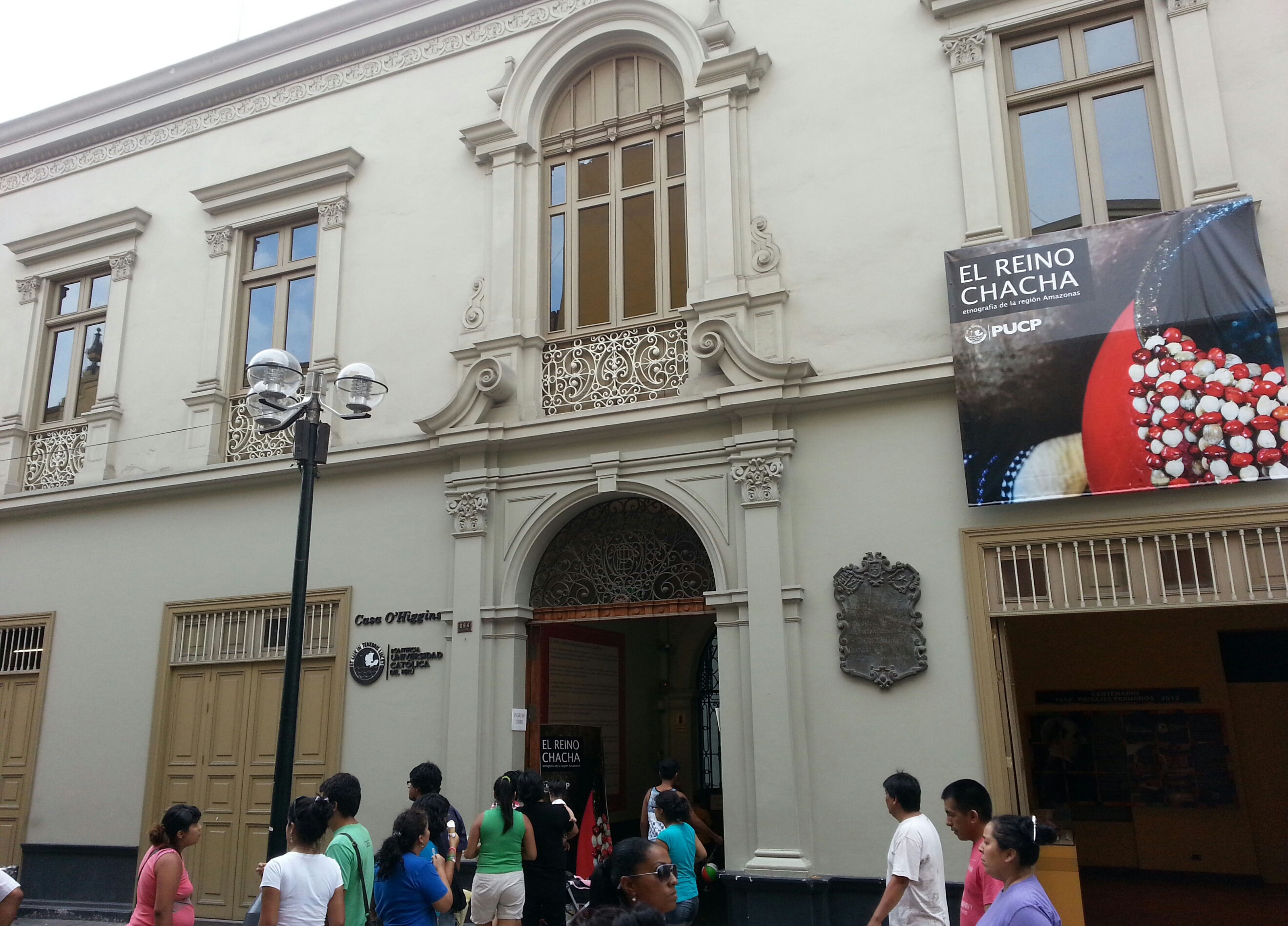
- Interactive map of the Casa O'Higgins area

General information
- Architectural style: Spanish Colonial
- Location: Jirón de la Unión 554
- Owner: Riva-Agüero Institute

Technical details
- Floor count: 2

The Casa O'Higgins is a colonial-style building located in the historic centre of Lima, specifically located in the Jirón de la Unión, a few metres from the Plaza de Armas of the Peruvian capital. Since 2008, the house has functioned as a cultural centre of the Pontifical Catholic University of Peru and a permanent space dedicated to the memory of Bernardo O'Higgins. It forms part of the Cultural heritage of Peru.

== History ==
The house bears its name because it was the mansion where the Chilean soldier and politician, Bernardo O'Higgins, spent part of his youth, who is considered a Father of the Nation of Chile and one of the Libertadores of Latin America. After his abdication as Supreme Director of Chile in 1823, it was also his home of exile in the newly independent Republic of Peru until his death in 1842. Bernardo O'Higgins was the son of Ambrosio O'Higgins, viceroy of Peru between 1796 and 1801.

Later, the second floor of the house briefly housed the National Club between 1892 and 1895, being owned by Ignacio de Osma y Ramírez de Arellano through the Ramírez de Arellano y Baquíjano Testamentary. Starting in 1897, the house functioned as the first location of the International Bank of Peru, and was later occupied by the renowned Astoria restaurant during the 1920s.

After remaining for years in a state of natural deterioration over time, the house is currently preserved as a restored house museum and has been open to the public since 2008. For this, it was financed by the Chilean Army at the beginning, and later received contributions from the Chilean government through cultural funds from the Foreign Ministry through an agreement with the Pontifical Catholic University of Peru (PUCP). Within its premises, it has a room adapted for exhibitions of historical-cultural interest. It is administered by the PUCP's Riva-Agüero Institute.

== See also ==
- Riva-Agüero Institute
- Chile–Peru relations
