= Jirón Camaná =

Street in Lima, Peru

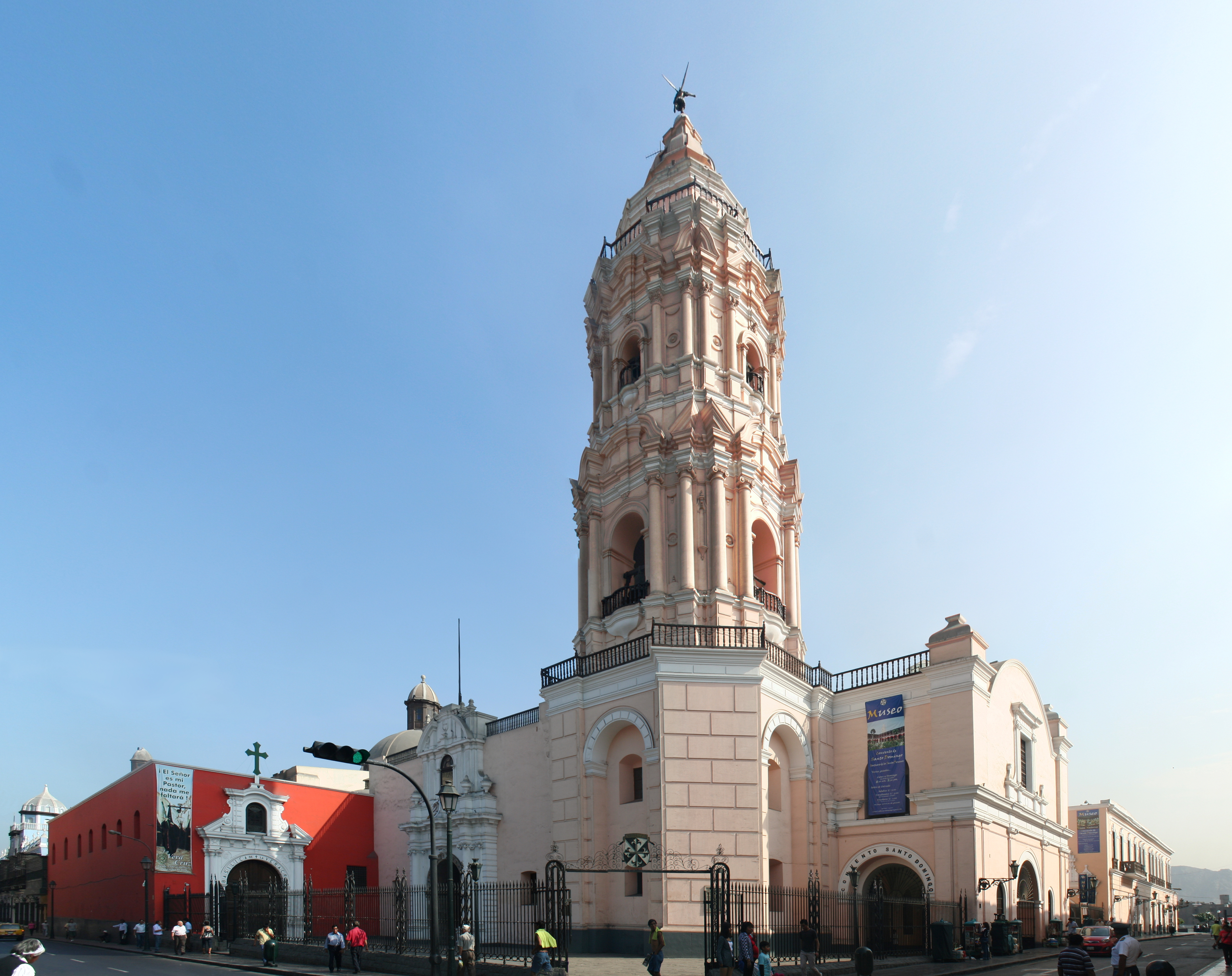
- Convent of Santo Domingo
- Interactive map of Jirón Camaná
- Part of: Damero de Pizarro
- Namesake: Camaná Province
- From: Prol. Tacna
- Major junctions: Jirón Conde de Superunda, Jirón Callao, Jirón Ica, Jirón Huancavelica, Avenida Emancipación, Jirón Moquegua, Jirón Ocoña, Nicolás de Piérola Avenue, Jirón Quilca, Uruguay Avenue
- To: Bolivia Avenue

Construction
- Completed: 1535

Jirón Camaná is a major street in the Damero de Pizarro, located in the historic centre of Lima, Peru. The street starts at the Alameda Chabuca Granda and continues southwest until it reaches Jirón Jacinto López, next to the Plaza Francia, continuing directly south until it reaches Bolivia Avenue, next to the Lima Civic Center.

The street was an important place for the bohemian movement in Lima, with its first five blocks being known for its libraries, and its later blocks for places such as restaurants and art establishments.

== History ==
The road that today constitutes the street was laid by Francisco Pizarro when he founded the city of Lima on January 18, 1535.

The street houses the Casa Malherbe, a 667.94 m^{2} two-storey building with a Serlian-adorned balcony, originally sold by Francisca Cabrera y Gallegos to Rafael Gordillo y Salazar in 1746, one month after the earthquake of the same year. It was eventually purchased in 1866 by French merchant and carpenter Juan Bautista Malherbe, after whom the house became known as the Malherbe y Cía, even after his death in 1916.

Also located in the street are the Orezzoli Building, a 1433.08 m^{2} three-storey eclectic building that dates back to either the 1920s or 1930s, originally the property of Conquistador Sebastián de Torres y Muriel; and the Casa Nadal, a 288 m^{2} two-storey building named after the Spaniard Ricardo Nadal y Solá, who purchased it in 1913. Nadal was known for his drugstore, the Botica del Correo, located almost one block from his house, which continues to operate to date.

During the early 20th century, the street was one of the places frequented by adherents of Bohemianism, who visited places such as the Queirolo, a bar established in 1920 on the corner with Jirón Quilca, and left their mark on the street, since considered a cultural area.

On September 30, 1929, the city's first automatic traffic light was inaugurated by then president Augusto B. Leguía. It was located at the street's intersection with Nicolás de Piérola Avenue.

In 1942, the Yugoslav Society, which represented the Croatian (and Yugoslavian) minority in Peru at the time, moved to the street, located in its corner with Jirón Ica.

The street has seen a number of official state visits by the British royal family. In 1959, the Duchess of Kent and her daughter Alexandra visited the building leased by the British–Peruvian Cultural Association where the association's central offices, cinematheque, and central library operated. In 1962, the Duke of Edinburgh visited the same building. The house was ultimately bought from their original owners, the Checa Solari family, in 1980, and renovated in 2018. Other British personalities who visited the building include Aldous Huxley, Arnold J. Toynbee and J. B. Priestley.

In addition to the aforementioned visits, then Princess Margrethe of the Kingdom of Denmark once purchased two toritos de Pucará, a poncho from Cuzco and a rug, all in the street, during her state visit in 1966.

The Museo de Artes y Tradiciones Populares (Museum of Popular Arts and Traditions) of the Riva-Agüero Institute, established in 1979, is located at jirón Camaná 459.

During the economic crisis of the 1980s, both Quilca and Camaná streets became known for their book stores, which sold second-hand books and music cassettes at an affordable price. The leasing contract between these stores and the Archdiocese of Lima, effective since 1997, expired in 2016.

== Block names ==
Until 1862, each block (cuadra) had a unique name:

- Block 1: Pileta de Santo Domingo, after the fountain belonging to the convent of the same name. In its corner was the Casa Honda, where the second corral de comedias of the city was located.
- Block 2: Pozuelo de Santo Domingo, after the pozuelo also belonging to the convent.
- Block 3: Plumereros, after the feather-selling businesses located there. According to Luis A. Eguiguren, these feathers would be used in hats, to clean up dust, etc.
- Block 4: Lártiga, after Colonel José de Lártiga y Torres of the Spanish Army, who lived there. This street is the location of the Casa Riva-Agüero.
- Block 5: Ayacucho, after the battle of the same name. This name only came in 1825; prior to that it was known as Ánimas de San Agustín, among other names. It was on this street that Bartolomé Manrique, founder of the hospice of the same name in the Plaza Francia, was stabbed to death in 1866.
- Block 6: Pelota, after a Basque pelota establishment that was extremely popular among locals.
- Block 7: Urrutia, after a resident of the same name.
- Block 8: Serrano, after Juan Serrano, who lived there and is mentioned in the street's earliest name.
- Block 9: Amargura, first designated as such in 1629 and then in 1637, the former initially applying to the nine-block street.

In 1862, when a new urban nomenclature was adopted, the road was named jirón Camaná, after the province of the same name in Arequipa.

== See also ==
- Historic Centre of Lima
