= Giacoletti Building =

Cultural heritage site in Lima, Peru

- Edificio Giacoletti, Edificio Juan Romano
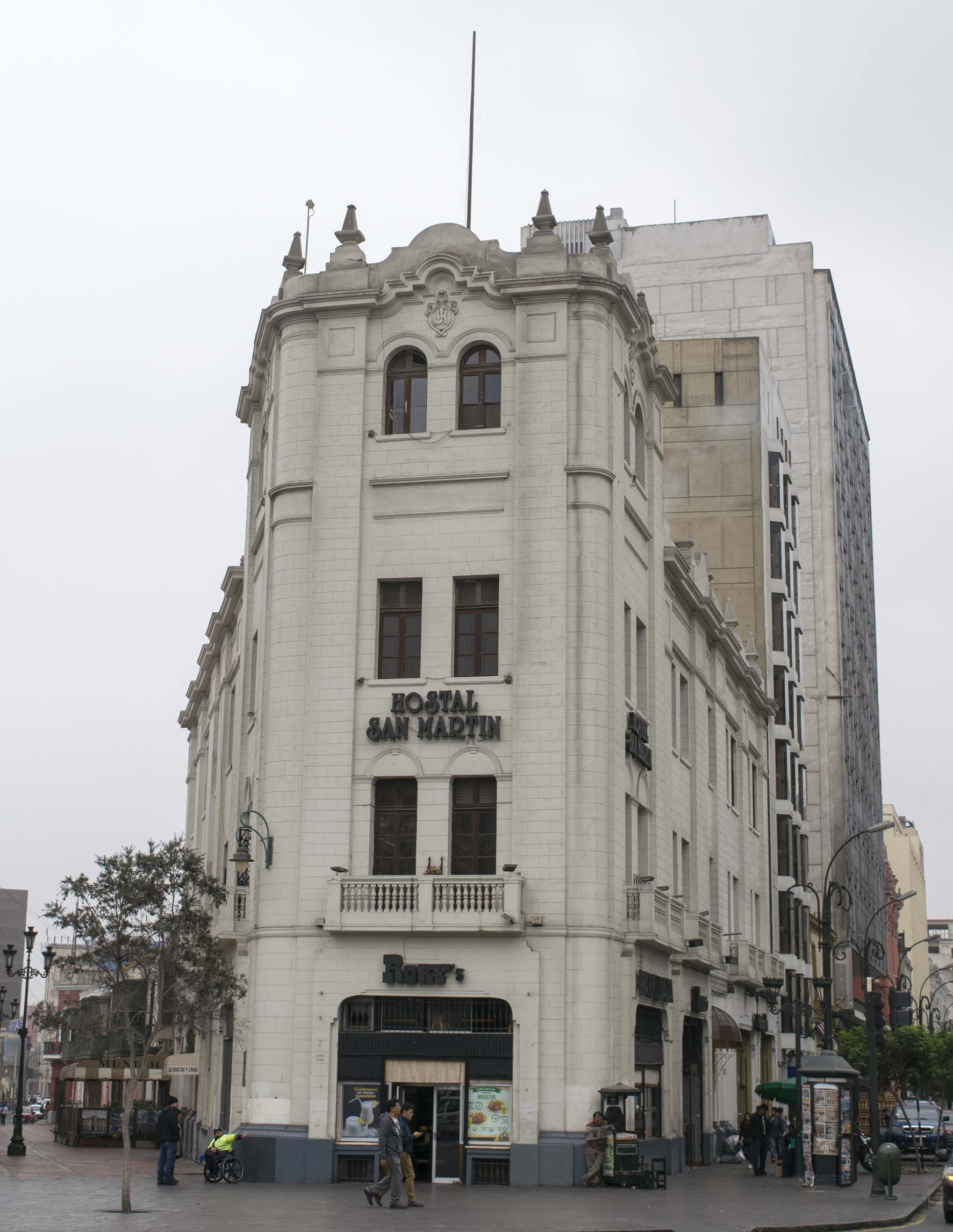
- The building in 2017

General information
- Status: Destroyed
- Architectural style: Art Nouveau (1912–40s); Neocolonial (1940s–2018)
- Location: Plaza San Martín, Lima
- Address: Av. Nicolás de Piérola 890
- Coordinates: 12.0513°S 77.03547°W
- Completed: 1912
- Destroyed: October 27, 2018

The Giacoletti Building (Spanish: Edificio Giacoletti), also known as the Juan Romano Building (Spanish: Edificio Juan Romano), was a historical commercial building located in San Martín Plaza. In 1972 it was declared a historical monument of Lima. The building was destroyed in a fire on October 27, 2018. Restoration works began on August 28, 2025.

== History ==
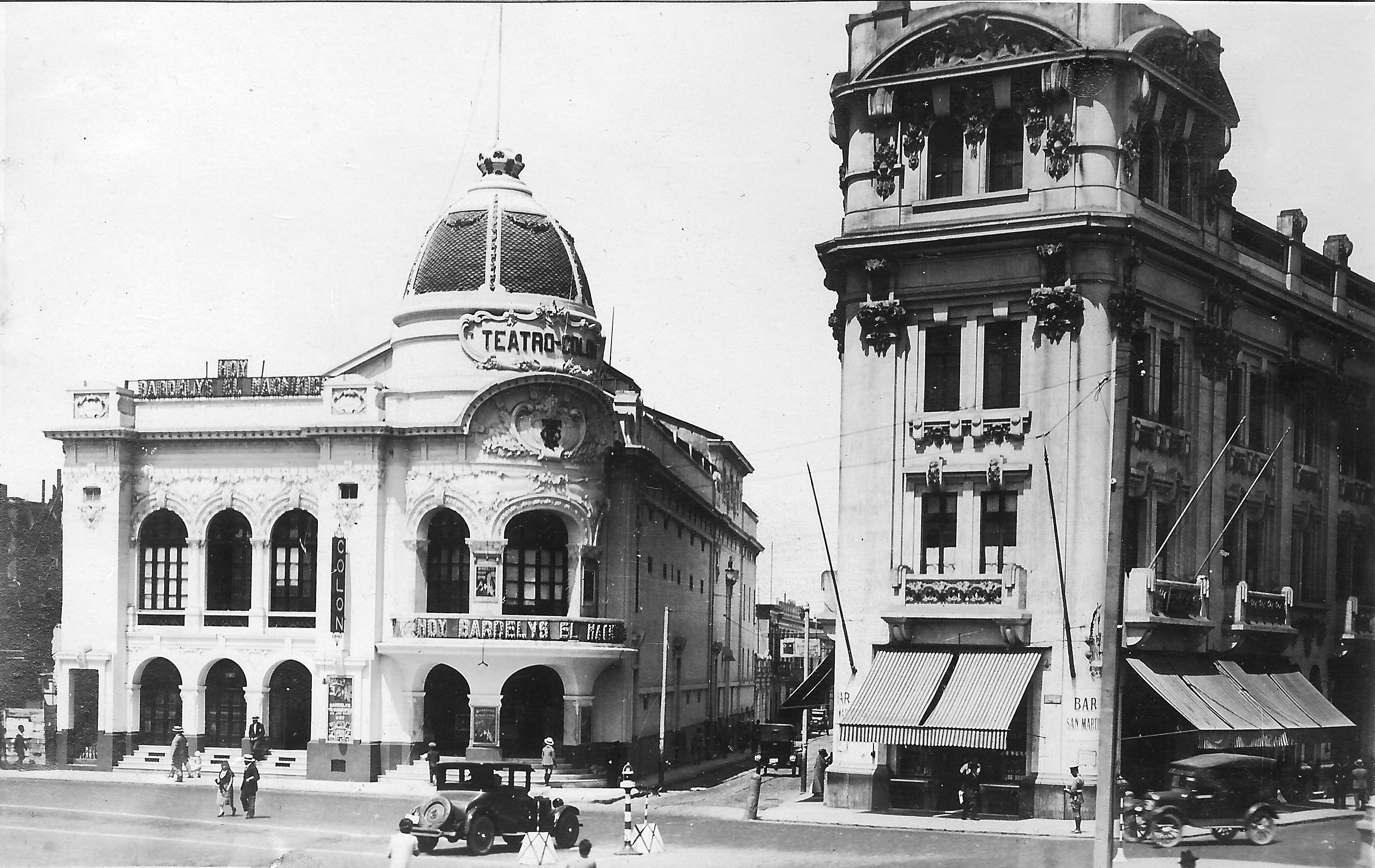
The building (right) next to the Teatro Colón (left)

The building, a project by the Italian brothers Rinaldo, Antonio and Guido Masperi, was built under the auspices of the Lima-based merchant Juan Romano on land destined for new buildings that would surround and embellish the space destined for a new square under construction, which would be later known as the San Martín Plaza. The materials used to build the peculiar building with a triangular floor plan and four floors, in an academic style with some elements of Italian Art Nouveau, were adobe and quincha. Inside, the levels were connected by a European marble staircase. Being the first building erected around the future square, it set the style and height of other later buildings, such as the Hotel Bolívar, the Teatro Colón or the Club Nacional.

The building was originally known as the Juan Romano Building in honor of its promoter, but it was popularly renamed Giacoletti after Pedro Giacoletti's Italian cafeteria that operated on the first floor.

In the 1940s the Art Nouveau ornamentation was removed, lightening its decoration, and turning it into a neocolonial building.

During its more than one hundred years of existence, it housed different businesses, such as bars and restaurants. In the 1970s, Romano ceded the space to the El Cortijo chicken parlor. In 1972, the Giacoletti building was declared a historical monument of the city. Later the poultry shop moved to the Barranco district, and the Parrilladas San Martín restaurant was installed on the premises, a business that did not last long due to the Peruvian crisis of that time.

=== Fire ===
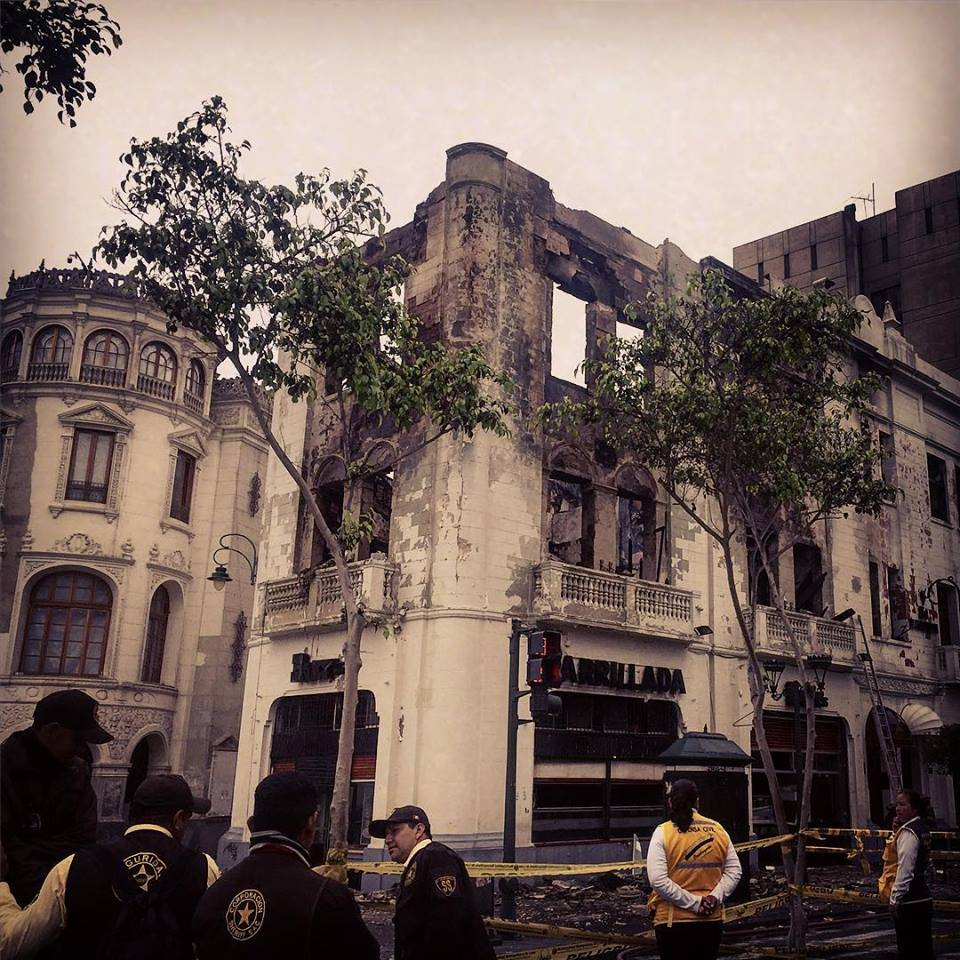
The building after the fire.

In the early morning of October 27, 2018, the building was damaged by a fire that lasted three hours. On the first level of the five-story building was the Roky's chicken shop, which had been operating since the beginning of the year 2000, where it is presumed that the fire started. In addition, the building was the headquarters of a hostel. The fire would have started in a chimney flue and therefore spread rapidly to the upper floors.

The building has remained empty since, still in a dilapidated state and without final demolition or reconstruction due to bureaucratic obstacles and financing problems. Currently, only the outer part of the building remains, although plans to rebuild it have been proposed.

On August 7, 2025, the building was declared part of the Cultural heritage of Peru.

=== Restoration ===
Restoration works headed by PROLIMA began on August 28, 2025, with a ceremony headed by mayor Rafael López Aliaga. The new project aims to restore its original Art Nouveau style, dating back to 1908.

== See also ==
- Casa Marcionelli, destroyed in a fire in 2023
