= Casa Marcionelli =

Cultural heritage site in Lima, Peru

- Casona Marcionelli, Edificio Marcionelli
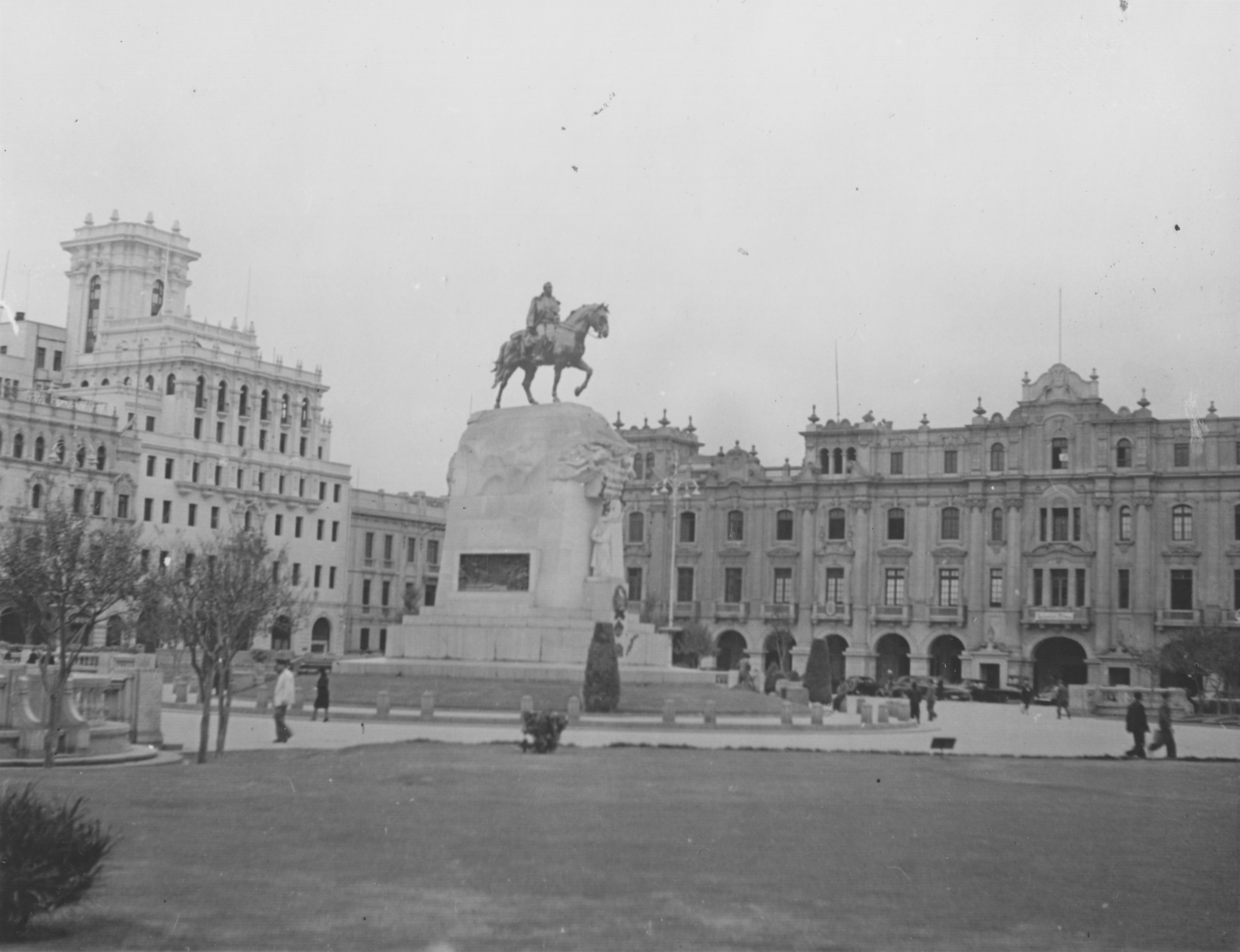
- The building (centre left) behind the equestrian statue of San Martín Plaza in 1941
- Interactive map of the Casa Marcionelli area

General information
- Status: Destroyed (partial)
- Architectural style: Colonial Revival (Neocolonial)
- Location: Historic Centre of Lima, Jr. Carabaya 955
- Completed: 1923
- Destroyed: January 19–20, 2023

The Casa Marcionelli is a historical residential and commercial building located near San Martín Plaza, in Lima. The 3-storey building was partially destroyed in 2023 by a fire during a series of protests in its immediate surroundings. The building was named after its first owner, Severino Marcionelli.

== History ==
The building's area was bought by Italian Swiss businessman and philanthropist Severino Marcionelli (Bironico, 1869 – Lima, 1957), originally from Ticino, alongside his business partner, José Di Luka Hanza Pericevic, originally from Cannosa, Dalmatia. Marcionelli, who emigrated to Peru in 1890, was a mining entrepreneur who owned mines in southern Peru, had previously participated in the construction of the high-altitude Galera railway tunnel in Ticlio, and had also ventured into the country's agricultural sector. He also helped establish and was an important member of local organizations, such as the Club de la Unión or the Peruvian chapter of Pro Ticino, a diaspora organization for Ticinese Swiss in Peru, becoming an important member of the diaspora.

The building, built in the 1920s, originally housed Marcionelli's mining company's offices. Marcionelli himself served as honorary consul as the building also began to house the Consulate general of Switzerland in Lima until the late 1940s, when the consulate was elevated to a legation. The current location of the Swiss embassy in Lima also belonged to Marcionelli.

=== Fire ===
A fire began on the night of January 19, 2023, amid anti-government protests in its immediate surroundings and in the nearby San Martín Plaza. The fire was classified as a Code 3, i.e. out of control, later escalating to a Code 4, i.e. an unsalvageable fire or a "local tragedy". The building's façade gradually collapsed in the night of the 19th and early morning of the 20th, with only parts of the first floor surviving. Firefighters reportedly had problems with fire hydrants and were thus unable to properly stop the fire for hours. At the time of the fire, the house had been recently restored for the rental of its spaces in artistic exhibitions and to be used as a hostal. One person was evacuated to a nearby hospital and two people were treated for smoke inhalation as a result of the fire. All of the building's inhabitants were evacuated but were left homeless.

Tear gas canisters deployed by police forces were pointed out by protestors as a possible source of the fire, but statements by authorities such as Interior Minister Vicente Romero Fernández pointed out that such a claim was false, as said devices cannot cause fires. The cause of the fire is still under investigation.

A security camera from the Municipality of Lima recorded the moment in which the protesters launched fireworks near the house; the residents of the place declared to the press that an explosion was heard before the incident.

== See also ==
- Giacoletti Building, destroyed in 2018
- Casa Tenaud, destroyed in 1945
