= Dólar MUC =

Former currency of Peru

The MUC dollar (Spanish: Dólar de Mercado Único de Cambio; Dólar MUC) was an artificial currency that circulated in Peru since October 1977 controlled by the Central Reserve Bank of Peru by order of the government of Francisco Morales Bermúdez, through Law No. 21,953. Its purpose was to encourage national investments, avoiding import controls, through a model where the state bought dollars at the open market exchange rate, assuming a part of this purchase cost (subsidy), and finally sold it at a lower price to national businessmen, who, in turn, should use it exclusively to invest in their industries and thus strengthen national production. It was ultimately no different than the regular U.S. dollar at an accessible price.

Between 1978 and 1986, the difference between the price of the MUC dollar and that of the free market did not exceed 10%. Due to the country's hyperinflation, however, businessmen stopped trusting the national economy and began to use the MUC dollar in their personal accounts, which increased the instability and generated a sharp decrease in the country's international reserves.

On August 8, 1990, reforms were announced by then Prime Minister, Juan Carlos Hurtado Miller, which eliminated the single exchange market and thus, eliminated the currency named after it.

A similar currency is the more expensive Dólar blue (also known as the Dólar negro), which started circulating in Argentina in 2011 as a result of the country's economic crisis. Unlike the Peruvian artificial currency, the Argentine currency is a part of the country's black market. Similarly, the informal Ocoña dollar circulated in the 1990s.

== See also ==
- Jirón Ocoña
