= Club Nacional (Peru) =

Private club and cultural heritage site in Lima, Peru

Coordinates: 12.0517°S 77.0358°W

National Club
- Club Nacional
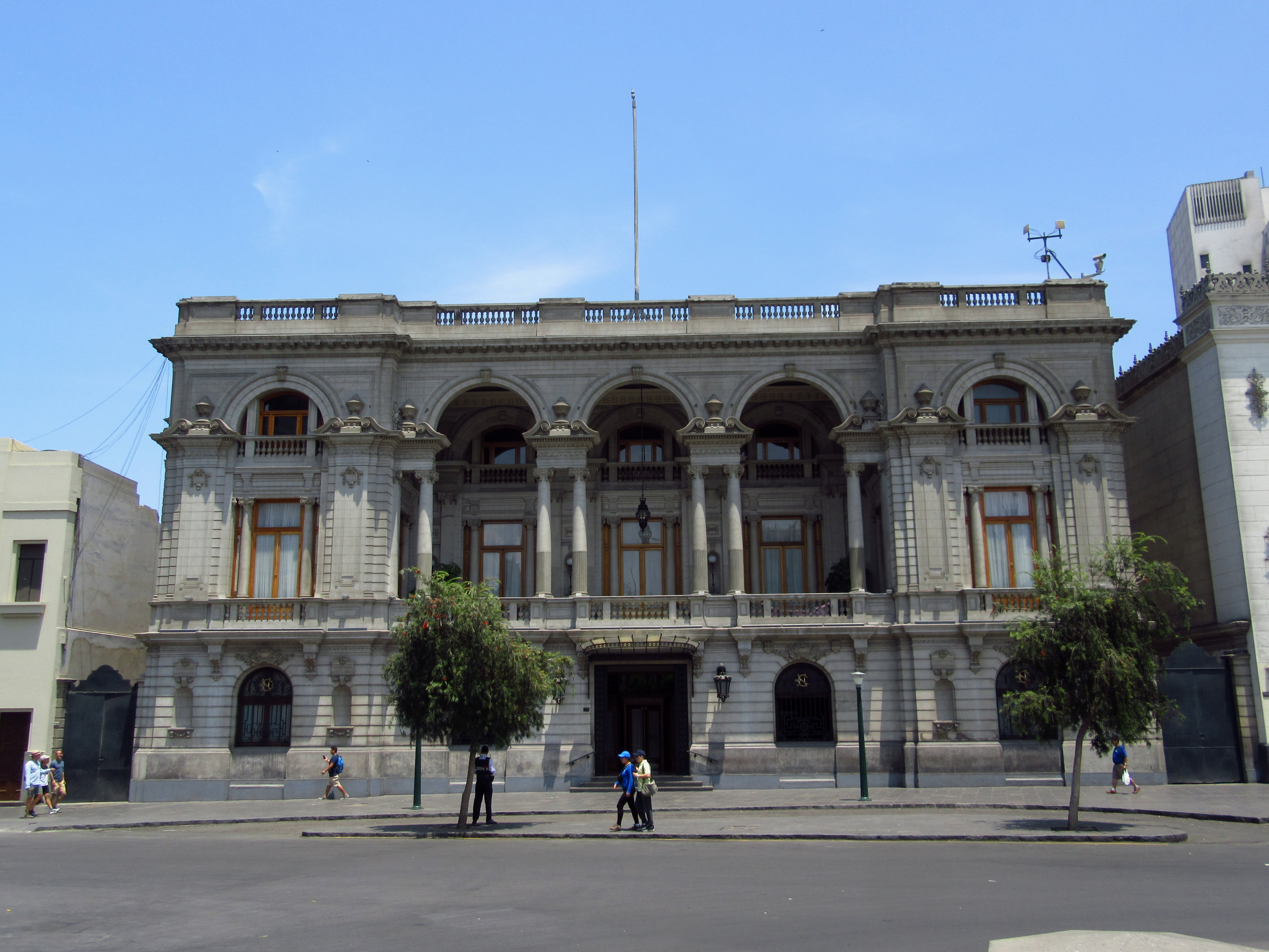
- Headquarters in the Plaza San Martín
- Formation: October 19, 1855
- Type: Association
- Headquarters: Jr. de la Unión 1016, Lima
- President: Roque Benavides Ganoza
- Website: Club Nacional

The National Club (Spanish: Club Nacional) is a private club and civil association based in the Plaza San Martín of the Historic Centre of Lima. Founded on October 19, 1855, it has been the meeting place for the Peruvian aristocracy throughout the 19th and 20th centuries, as its members are members of the most distinguished and wealthy families in the country.

Of its kind, it has been considered one of the ten best and most elegant clubs in the world for its facilities, bibliographic heritage and services.

== History ==
The National Club was founded on October 19, 1855 by 81 members among which were members of the old Peruvian aristocracy as well as prominent foreign merchants. Its first president was Gaspar de la Puente and its first members included among others José Antonio Barrenechea, José Antonio de Lavalle, Ignacio de Osma, Manuel Pardo y Lavalle, José de la Riva-Agüero and José Antonio García y García.

The club was established based on the English gentlemen's clubs that were founded during the 18th century in London, mainly in the St James's neighborhood known as Clubland, and grew in popularity throughout Europe during the 19th century. These social centers were frequented by its first president Gaspar de la Puente and contributed to create a reputation to the National Club as the "Old men's Club".

Its first institutional premises were located in some apartments on the upper floors of the Hotel del Universo on the corner of the Portal de San Agustín with Lártiga St., whose owner was the French citizen Estanislao Courtheoux. This hotel was located in the so-called Plazuela del Teatro (named after the Segura Theatre next to it) and was a few blocks from the Palace of Government. In 1859, the club was relocated to one of its members' houses in the Valladolid street and then was moved to the ancestral home of the Counts of Fuente González and Villar de Fuentes (known today as Casa Barbieri) where it occupied the apartments of the upper floor.

Then, in 1869, the club was moved to its fourth location at the corner of the Portal de Botoneros and Mercaderes St. in the Plaza Mayor, where the Phoenix Club would later be located. In this place, the members of the club were eyewitnesses of the Gutiérrez brothers' attempted coup d'état in 1872 and after the events of the War of the Pacific and the Chilean occupation of Lima. Later, between 1891 and 1895, the club occupied the upper floors of the so-called Casa O'Higgins which was once the house of Bernardo O'Higgins and was owned by De la Riva-Agüero family at the time. The club briefly hosted the members of the Club de la Unión in this location, after the troops of General Andrés Avelino Cáceres assaulted and looted the headquarters of that institution during the events of the Peruvian civil war of 1894-1895.

In 1895, the club was located in a small palace on Núñez street, owned by Mr. Ernesto Puccio, located within the Cercado de Lima. The move to this location meant a period of consolidation for the club, which materialized in the use of a complete lot for the first time. Finally, in 1929, it was established in its permanent location in front of the Plaza San Martín, on the foundations of a house that belonged to Guillermo Talleri and that had formerly belonged to the Silva Santisteban family.

In 1881, considering the economic crisis created by the War with Chile, the president of the young Club de la Unión General César Canevaro proposed the fusion of both clubs under the presidency of the National Club. The plan which effectively had united the two main Peruvian clubs was voted and then rejected by the National Club members.

Distinguished characters from Peruvian republican life have belonged to the National Club, including seventeen presidents of the Republic (including José Pardo and Augusto B. Leguía who served as vicepresidents) and notable figures who took part in the historic events of May 2, 1866, in the naval campaign of 1879, in the trenches of San Juan and Miraflores, and in the battle of Huamachuco. Likewise, the club was the main meeting place for the twenty-four friends, an oligarchy group belonging to the Civilista Party that led the country during a historical period known as the Aristocratic Republic.

== Clubhouse ==
National Club
- Interactive map of the National Club area

General information
- Architectural style: Beaux-Arts
- Location: Plaza San Martín, Jr. de la Unión 1016
- Completed: 1929

Design and construction
- Architect: Ricardo de Jaxa Malachowski

The current premises of the club were built next to the Teatro Colón and on the site of a small square called the Plaza de la Micheo located between the old streets of Belén and Iturrizaga, whose land today forms part of Plaza San Martín, one of the main squares of the historic centre of Lima inaugurated by President Augusto B. Leguía in 1921 during the celebrations for the Centennial of the Independence of Peru.

The design and plans were entrusted to the Polish architect Ricardo de Jaxa Malachowski and the engineer Enrique Bianchi. In the first stage of construction of the building, the New York-based firm The Foundation Company intervened and later the administration of the work was assumed directly by the architect Malachowski, which was completed in 1929. The engineer Bianchi, one of the promoters of the project, passed away before seeing it finished.

The French academic-style building is currently located in front of Plaza San Martín, on the west side at the corner of the Portal de Zela with the Jirón de la Unión. Due to its architectural value, it has been declared a historical monument as part of the Cultural Heritage of the Nation.

In front of this place, the director of the newspaper El Comercio, Antonio Miró Quesada de la Guerra, was murdered in 1935 together with his wife María Laos Argüelles by a young Aprista, when they were both walking from the Hotel Bolívar to have lunch at the club.

== List of presidents ==
The following list details the members who have held the presidency of the club since its founding in 1855:

President	Period
Gaspar de la Puente y Remírez de Laredo	1855-1860
José Antonio Barrenechea y Morales	1860-1863
Enrique de Armero Campos	1863-1866
Francisco Rosas Balcázar	1866-1870
Miceno Espantoso y Oramas	1870-1874
Dionisio Derteano y Echenique	1875-1876
Ignacio de Osma y Ramírez de Arellano	1876-1879
Dionisio Derteano y Echenique	1884-1888
Rafael Canevaro y Valega	1888-1890
Ignacio de Osma y Ramírez de Arellano	1890-1893
Enrique Barreda y Osma	1893-1896
Ricardo Ortiz de Zevallos y Tagle	1896-1897
Manuel María Gálvez Egúsquiza	1897-1899
Luis Bryce de Vivero	1899-1901
Manuel Yrigoyen Arias	1901-1902
Pedro Gallagher Robertson	1902-1905
Felipe Pardo y Barreda	1905-1906
Domingo Olavegoya Yriarte	1906
Juan Pardo y Barreda	1906-1908
Mariano Ignacio Prado Ugarteche	1909-1912
Amador del Solar Cárdenas	1912-1913
Luis Pardo y Barreda	1913-1915
Mariano Ignacio Prado Ugarteche	1915-1917
Ántero Aspíllaga Barrera	1917-1919
Manuel Vicente Villarán Godoy	1919-1921
Pedro de Osma y Pardo	1921-1922
Felipe de Osma y Pardo	1922-1924
Antonio Graña de los Reyes	1924-1927
Lizardo Alzamora Mayo	1927-1928
Carlos Zavala Loayza	1927-1929
Demetrio Olavegoya Marriot	1929-1931
Luis Rey Melgar	1930-1931
Manuel Yrigoyen Diez Canseco	1931-1933
Augusto Wiese Eslava	1933-1934

President	Period
Carlos Zavala Loayza	1934-1936
Carlos Palacios Villacampa	1936-1938
Francisco Echenique y Bryce	1938-1940
Hernando de Lavalle y García	1940-1942
Manuel Gallagher Canaval	1942-1944
Héctor García y Lastres	1944-1946
Luis Gallo Porras	1946-1948
Waldemar Schröder y Mendoza	1948-1950
Daniel Olaechea y Olaechea	1950-1952
José Quesada Larrea	1952-1954
Miguel Mujica Gallo	1954-1957
Alberto Quesada Larrea	1957-1959
José Bentín Mujica	1959-1961
Armando Revoredo Iglesias	1961-1963
Antonio Graña Garland	1963
Felipe de Osma y Porras	1963-1965
Miguel Mujica Gallo	1965-1967
Diomedes Arias Schreiber del Busto	1967-1969
Armando Revoredo Iglesias	1969-1971
Miguel Mujica Gallo	1971-1974
César Barrios Canevaro	1974-1976
Víctor Aspíllaga Delgado	1976-1978
Fernando Carrillo de Albornoz Barúa	1978-1980
Miguel Mujica Gallo	1979-1981
Augusto Felipe Wiese de Osma	1981-1984
César Aramburú Raygada	1984-1986
Eduardo Freundt Dalmau	1986-1987
Felipe de Osma Elías	1987-1988
Fernando Ortiz de Zevallos Basadre	1988-1990
Jaime García Ribeyro Dañino	1990-1992
Francisco Moreyra García	1992-1994
Óscar Berckemeyer Pérez-Hidalgo	1994-1996
César del Río Málaga	1996-1998
Mario Brescia Cafferata	2000-2002

== See also ==
- History of Peru (1895–1919), a period known as the Aristocratic Republic in Peruvian historiography.
- Historic Centre of Lima
- Plaza San Martín, Lima
