= Jirón Rufino Torrico =

Street in Lima, Peru

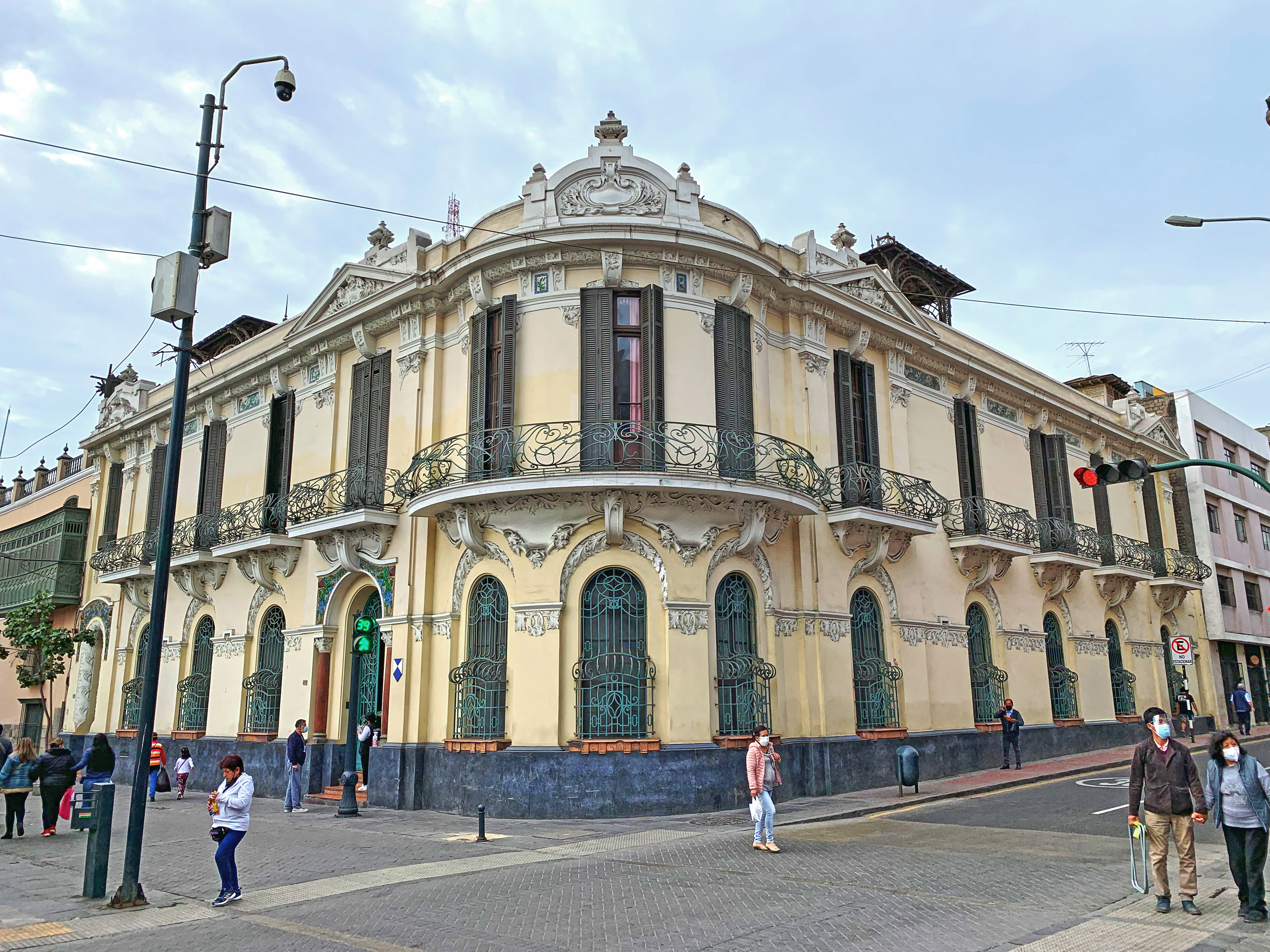
- Casa Fernandini
- Part of: Damero de Pizarro
- Namesake: Rufino Torrico
- From: Jirón Conde de Superunda
- Major junctions: Jirón Callao, Jirón Ica, Jirón Huancavelica, Avenida Emancipación, Jirón Moquegua, Jirón Ocoña, Avenida Colmena
- To: Wilson Avenue

Construction
- Completion: 1535

Rufino Torrico Street (Spanish: Jirón Rufino Torrico), formerly Arica Street (Spanish: Jirón Arica), is a major street in the Damero de Pizarro, located in the historic centre of Lima, Peru. The street starts before its intersection with the Jirón Conde de Superunda, parallel to the Prolongación Tacna, and continues until it reaches Inca Garcilaso de la Vega Avenue.

== History ==
The road that today constitutes the street was laid by Francisco Pizarro when he founded the city of Lima on 18 January 1535. In 1862, when a new urban nomenclature was adopted, the road was named jirón Arica, after the province in Tacna. Prior to this renaming, each block (cuadra) had a unique name:

- Block 1: [La] Toma, after the mouth of the water intake located there.
- Block 2: [La] Palma, for reasons not clear.
- Block 3: Panteoncito, after a burial ground of the Spanish or pre-Columbian era.
- Block 4: Nápoles, after Juan de Nápoles, according to Pedro Gálvez.
- Block 5: Belaochaga, after a resident whose identity is disputed.
- Block 6: Sacristía de San Marcelo, after the religious establishment of the same name.
- Block 7: Bravo, after the owner of a bakery that burned down on 30 June 1797, where 19 people died.
- Block 8: [La] Salud. Located next to the Plaza Elguera (formerly of the same name), its etymology is uncertain.
- Block 10, between blocks 11–12: Callejón de La Recoleta, after the Plaza de la Recoleta, which it connects with the Plaza Elguera.

In the 17th century, the Santo Tomás de Aquino School was founded on the first block's southern side.

From 1912 to 1913, the Casa Fernandini, an Art Nouveau building designed by French architect Claude Sahut, was built in the street's corner with Jirón Ica, across the street from the Municipal Theatre.

The Edificio Santo Toribio was built in the street's intersection with the Jirón Huancavelica in 1923 by Fred T. Ley & Cía, an American company. The three-storey, 925.30 m^{2} work is part of the set of real estate projects undertaken by the Archbishop of Lima, Emilio Lissón, in the 1920s to strengthen the economic activities of the archdiocese.

On 2 January 1935, a violent accident took place on the street's corner with jirón Callao, when Carlos González Crusalegui was run over by a tanker that violently steered to avoid a head-on collision with another tanker. González, who was violently thrown against a wall, was taken to the nearby Public Assistance Hospital, later being transferred to the Clínica Villarán and finally to Dos de Mayo National Hospital.

In 2016, the street was closed due to the acreditation of Pedro Pablo Kuczynski as president of Peru.

In 2021, pedestrianisation works began on the street, as well as the rest of the historic centre. The works' second phase began in 2022.

== See also ==
- Historic Centre of Lima
