= Riva-Agüero Institute =

Institute and historical building in Lima, Peru

Coordinates: 12.0471°S 77.0333°W

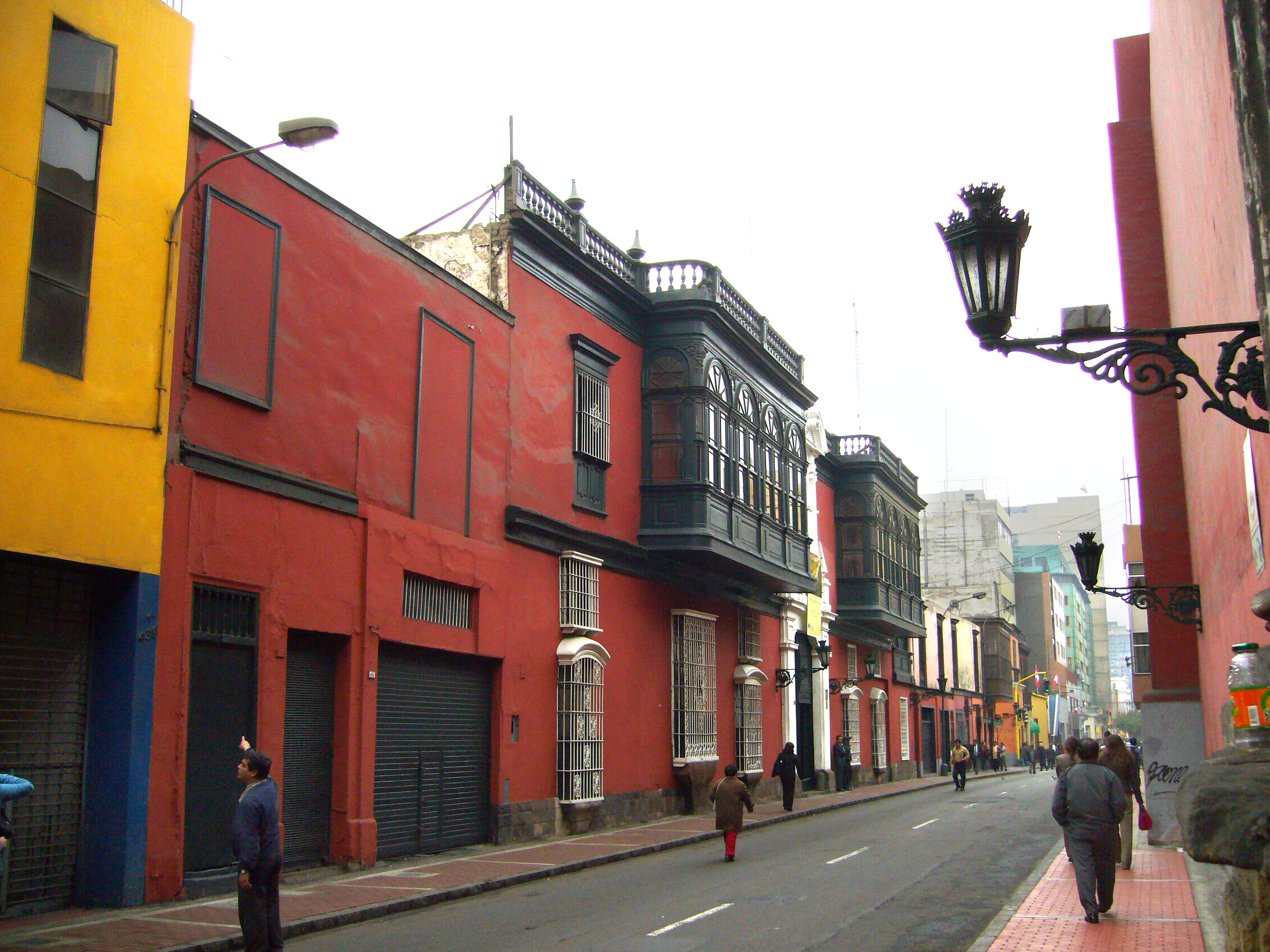
- The Casa Riva-Agüero
- Parent institution: PUCP
- Established: May 18, 1947
- Address: Jirón Camaná 459, Lima
- Website: ira.pucp.edu.pe

The Riva-Agüero Institute (Spanish: Instituto Riva-Agüero, IRA) is an institute created in 1947 by the Pontifical Catholic University of Peru, named after its benefactor, José de la Riva-Agüero y Osma. Located in the Casona Riva-Agüero of the historic centre of Lima, where Riva-Agüero lived until his dath, it serves a research centre for the human sciences that in 1955 reached the category of "School of Higher Studies" (Spanish: Escuela de Altos Estudios). It is divided into six research sections: Archaeology, Law, Ethnology, philosophy, Language and Literature, and History.

== History ==
The institute was founded three years after the death of Peruvian intellectual and politician José de la Riva-Agüero y Osma: the Pontifical Catholic University of Peru (PUCP), an institution to which he bequeathed his assets, welcomed an initiative by his friends and acquaintances to continue his life's work, agreeing to the institute's creation in October 1946 and formally founding it in a ceremony at his home at Lártiga Street on May 18, 1947. As part of the ceremony, Nuncio Luigi Arrigoni celebrated mass.

== Headquarters ==
The IRA operates in two historic buildings owned by the PUCP located in the centre of Lima: the Casona Riva-Agüero (headquarters) and the Casona O'Higgins.

=== Casona Riva-Agüero ===
The Casona Riva-Agüero, also known as the Casa Ramírez de Arellano, was built in 1760 by the Spanish colonel Domingo Ramírez de Arellano y Martínez de Tejada, to be used as a family home by him and his descendants. It is considered one of the main attractions of the historic centre of Lima and one of the best preserved ancient buildings in the city. It was owned by the Marquises of Montealegre de Aulestia and donated to the PUCP by the last of his descendants: José de la Riva-Agüero y Osma. In addition to classrooms and offices, there is a library, a historical archive known as the Riva-Agüero Historical Archive (Spanish: Archivo Histórico Riva-Agüero), and the Museum of Popular Arts and Traditions. The archive houses the documents inherited by Riva-Agüero from his ancestors, as well as those produced during his lifetime.

=== Casona O'Higgins ===
The original construction of the Casona O'Higgins dates back to the beginning of the 16th century. The construction was modified over time depending on the use given to the property. The Chilean hero Bernardo O'Higgins spent his adolescence in the building, during the government of his father: Ambrosio O'Higgins, viceroy of Peru. In 1830, during his exile, he rented the house, which he occupied with his family until his death in 1842. The house became property of the PUCP as part of the legacy left by Riva-Agüero. The archeology section and the Josefina Ramos de Cox museum operate there.

== See also ==
- Pontifical Catholic University of Peru
