= Jirón Conde de Superunda =

Street in Lima, Peru

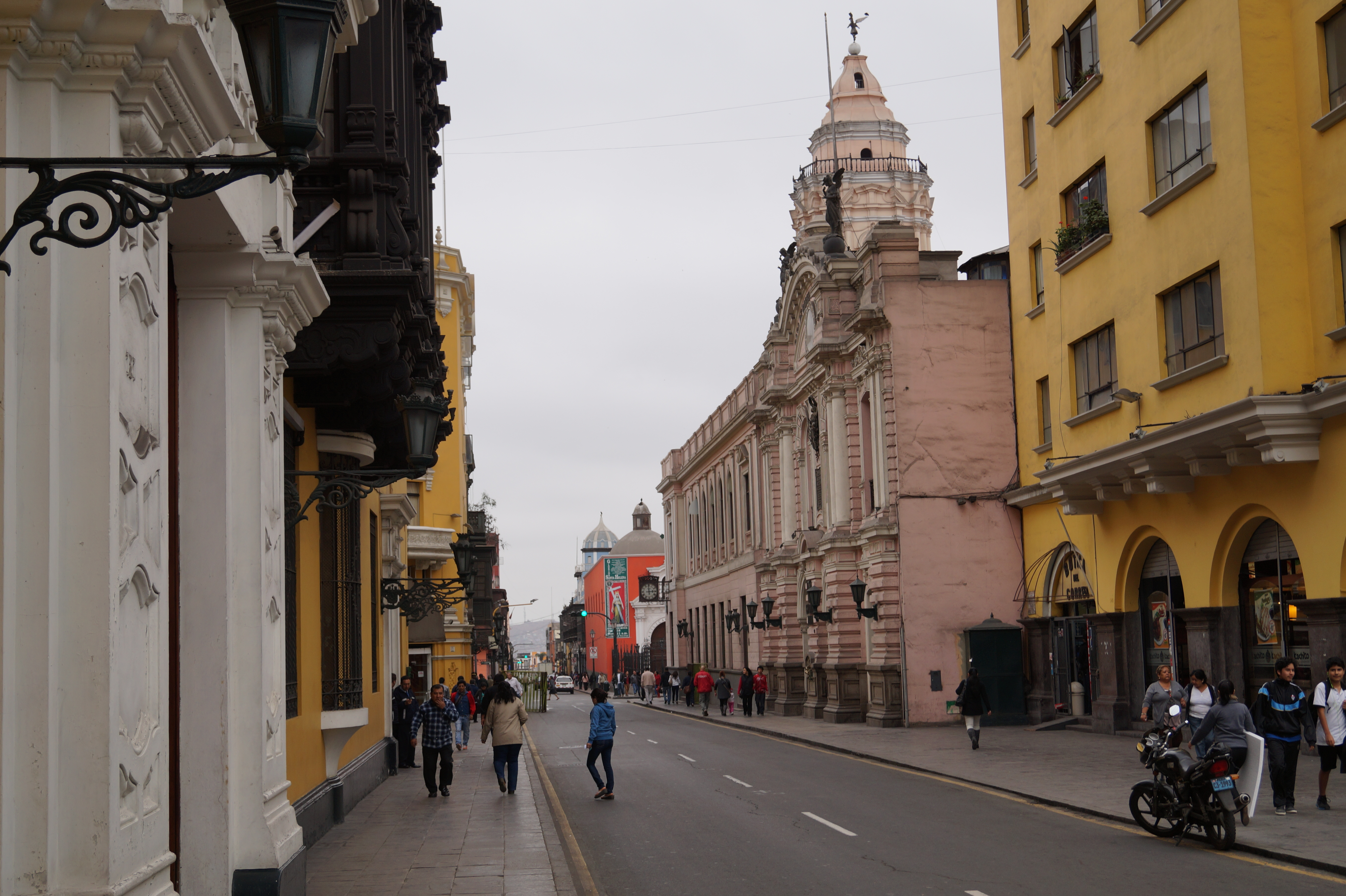
- View from the street's first block
- Interactive map of Jirón Conde de Superunda
- Part of: Damero de Pizarro
- Namesake: The Count of Superunda
- From: Jirón de la Unión
- Major junctions: See list: Jirón Camaná; Jirón Caylloma; Jirón Rufino Torrico; Avenida Tacna; Jirón Chancay
- To: Jirón Cañete

Construction
- Completion: 1535

Count of Superunda Street (Spanish: Jirón Conde de Superunda) is a major street in the Damero de Pizarro, located in the historic centre of Lima, Peru. The street starts at its intersection with Union Street, next to the Palacio Municipal de Lima, and continues until it reaches the Cañete Street.

== Name ==
The street's name comes from the project that was ultimately adopted in 1862, which replaced the city's traditional names with names that reflected the country's political geography. The term jirón is a type of street, whose axis is formed from a variety of different, single-block streets.

It was originally known as Lima Street (Spanish: Jirón Lima), after the department of the same name. This name was replaced by that of José Manso de Velasco, who served as Viceroy of Peru when the 1746 earthquake destroyed the city. He took charge of the efforts to rebuild the city and received the title of Count of Superunda from King Ferdinand VI.

== History ==
The road that today constitutes the street was laid by Francisco Pizarro when he founded the city of Lima on January 18, 1535. In 1862, when a new urban nomenclature was adopted, the road was named jirón Lima, after the department of the same name. Prior to this renaming, each block (cuadra) had a unique name:

- Block 1: Correo, after the Casa de Correos y Telegrafos.
- Block 2: Veracruz/Santo Domingo, after the Convent of Santo Domingo. This block also houses the Casa de Osambela, headquarters of the Academia Peruana de la Lengua.
- Block 3: Matavilela, after an unidentified resident.
- Block 4: Aumente, after José de Aumente, who lived there in the 17th century.
- Block 5: Santa Rosa de los Padres, after the birthplace of Rose of Lima.
- Block 6: Pastrana, after Alonso Martínez de Pastrana, who lived there in the 17th century.

The street's current name was adopted at a later date.

== See also ==
- Historic Centre of Lima
