= Jirón Caylloma =

Street in Lima, Peru

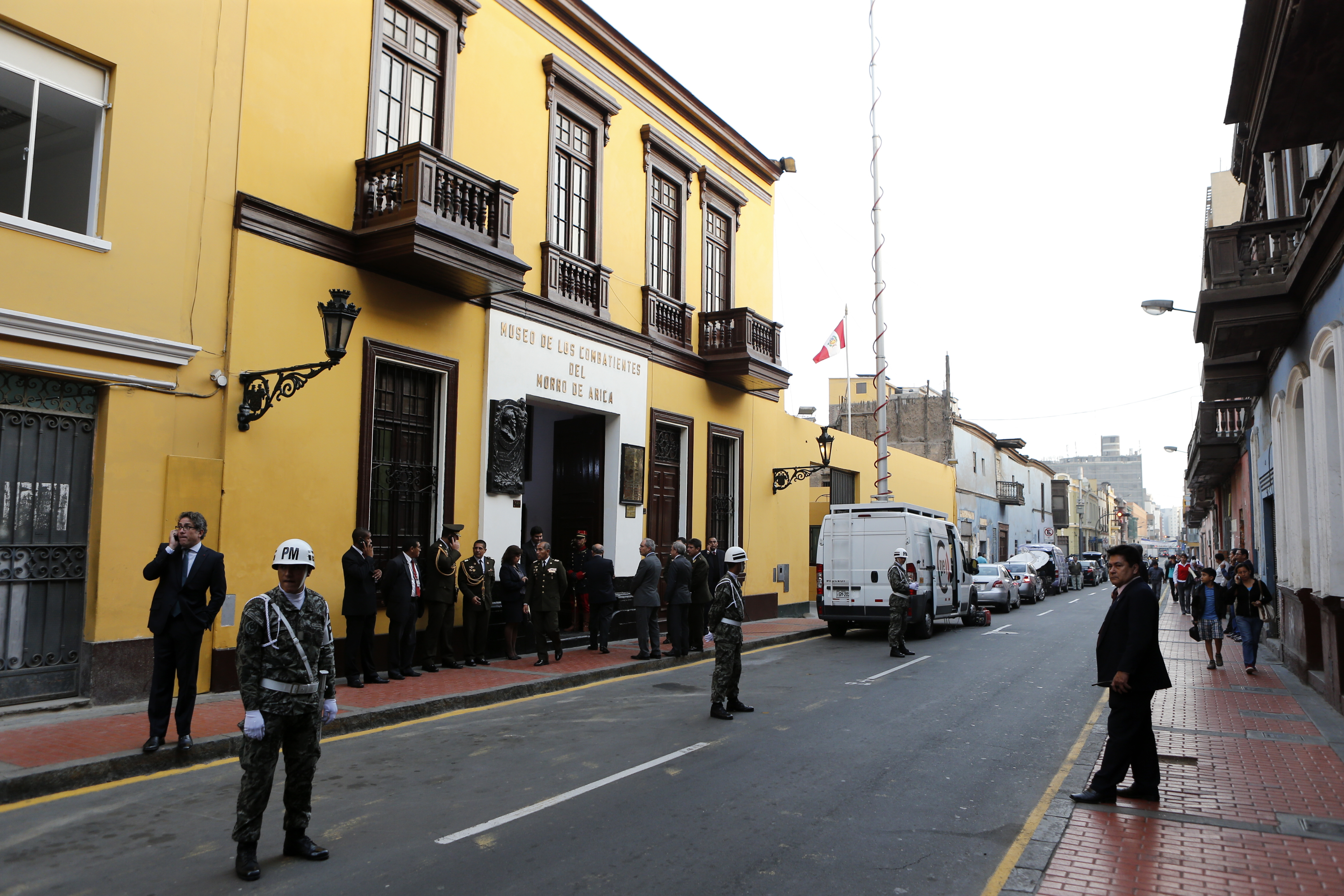
- Casa de Bolognesi, located in the first block
- Part of: Damero de Pizarro
- Namesake: Caylloma Province
- From: Jirón Conde de Superunda
- Major junctions: Jirón Callao, Jirón Ica, Jirón Huancavelica, Jirón Moquegua, Jirón Ocoña, Avenida Emancipación, La Colmena
- To: Jirón Quilca

Construction
- Completion: 1535

Jirón Caylloma, also known as Jirón Cailloma, is a major street in the Damero de Pizarro, located in the historic centre of Lima, Peru. The street starts at its intersection with Jirón Conde de Superunda and continues until it reaches Jirón Quilca.

The street has housed important characters of the republican history of Peru, such as Colonel Francisco Bolognesi and poet José Santos Chocano.

== History ==
The road that today constitutes the street was laid by Francisco Pizarro when he founded the city of Lima on January 18, 1535. With the expansion of the Basilica and Convent of Santo Domingo, the street was enclosed alongside the jirón Santa.

In 1862, when a new urban nomenclature was adopted, the road was named jirón Caylloma, after the province of the same name. Prior to this renaming, each block (cuadra) had a unique name:

- Block 1: Afligidos. According to José Gálvez Barrenechea, poet Acisclo Villarán once wrote that a large number persons afflicted by an earthquake sought refuge in the street, while José de la Riva-Agüero y Osma believed that an image of a denomination of the same name brought from Spain was instead the source for the street's nomenclature. Colonel Francisco Bolognesi was born on this street. His birthplace became a museum in 1975.
- Block 2: Argandoña, after Domingo Gonzáles de Argandoña, treasurer of the Cathedral of Lima, who lived there.
- Block 3: Calonge, after José P. Calonge, teacher at the University of San Marcos, who lived there.
- Block 4: Puerta Falsa de la Comedia or Arévalo, the latter after a resident whose identity is disputed between Juan Arévalo de Espinosa (according to Luis A. Eguiguren) and Andrés de Arévalo Ballesteros (according to Juan Bromley), and the former after an entrance to a corral de comedias located there.
- Block 5: Acequia Alta, after the acequia that ran through its path.
- Block 6: Villegas, most likely after retired captain José de Villegas, who owned a property there.
- Block 7: Monopinta, for reasons unknown.

The home of poet José Santos Chocano is located in the former Argandoña street. The 479.58 m^{2} building was built c. 1864-1865, inhabited by Chocano's family since 1874. He was born on May 14 of the following year. In 1922, while in a ceremony at the Palacio de la Exposición with Augusto B. Leguía, a plaque was placed in his home, the work of sculptor David Lozano.

Also located in the street is the Art Nouveau-decorated Pancorvo Building, named after the Pancorvo Brothers' company, who owned it.

On October 28, 1823, José Olaya, a spy for the Patriot side of the Peruvian War of Independence, was captured carrying correspondence from Callao, where Antonio José de Sucre was located. He was later executed on what became known as the Pasaje Olaya.

By 2012, the street was reported to be extremely dangerous at night due to its number of hostile homeless persons and criminals.

The street saw two fires in 2023, the first took place in May as a result of a failed irregular vacancy attempt which led to 40 arrests, and the second one took place in October, close to the Casa de Bolognesi, after an illegal warehouse caught on fire.

== See also ==
- Historic Centre of Lima
