= Plaza San Martín, Lima =

Cultural heritage site in Peru

Coordinates: 12.0515°S 77.0345°W

San Martín Square

- Location within Lima
- Location: Lima, Peru

History
- Built: 1921

UNESCO World Heritage Site
- Official name: Plaza San Martín
- Type: Non-movable
- Criteria: Monument
- Designated: 1991
- Part of: Historic Centre of Lima
- Reference no.: 500

San Martín Square (Spanish: Plaza San Martín) is one of the most representative public spaces of the city of Lima, Peru. It is located at the ninth block of Colmena avenue, within the Historic Centre of Lima which was declared a World Heritage Site in 1988 by UNESCO. It is located near the Plaza Mayor and is connected to it by the Jiron de la Union. Its central monument gives homage to Peru's liberator, José de San Martín.

== History ==
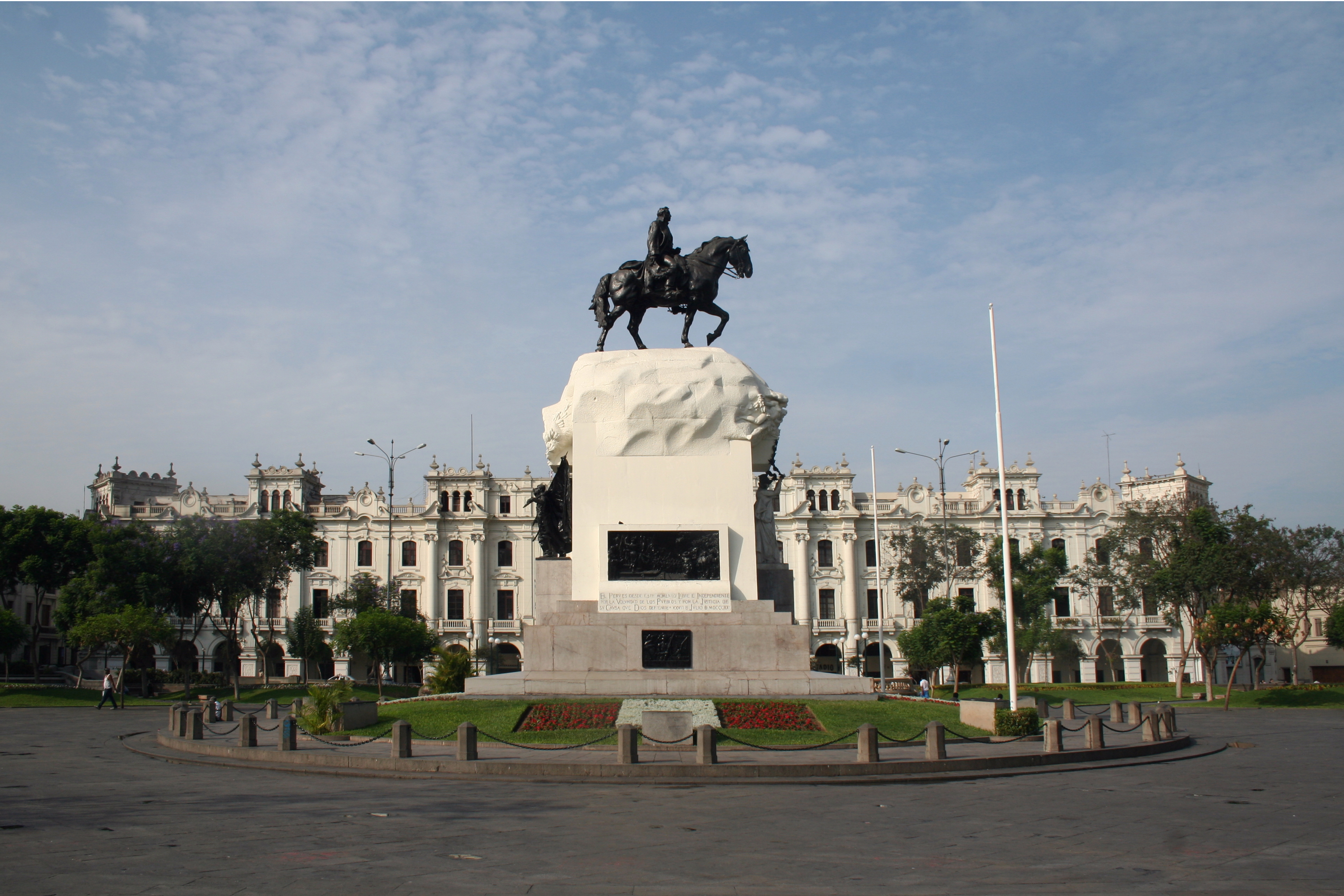
Monument to José de San Martín

=== Precedents ===
The location of the plaza had been the site of the San Juan de Dios hospital which was torn down in 1850 and replaced by a railway station, which in turn was torn down between 1911 and 1918.

Revolutionary politician Bernardo de Monteagudo was assassinated on the adjacent Plazoleta de la Micheo, now part of the plaza, in 1825. Later, on July 26, 1872, Silvestre Gutiérrez, a participant of the coup d'état headed by his brother Tomás, was killed in a shootout at the station.

=== Construction ===
The Plaza San Martín was inaugurated on July 27, 1921 in celebration of the 100th anniversary of the independence of Peru. The design, ornamentation, furnishing, and gardening of the plaza was designed by Spanish architect Manuel Piqueras Cotolí. The benches and handrails were constructed out of marble and the paving, of granite. There were also four water fountains, bronze streetlamps, and flower-filled gardens. The design for the monument to José de San Martín was chosen in a contest in which the design created by the Spanish sculptor Mariano Benlliure emerged victorious and illustrated San Martin during his voyage across the Andes.

== Architecture ==
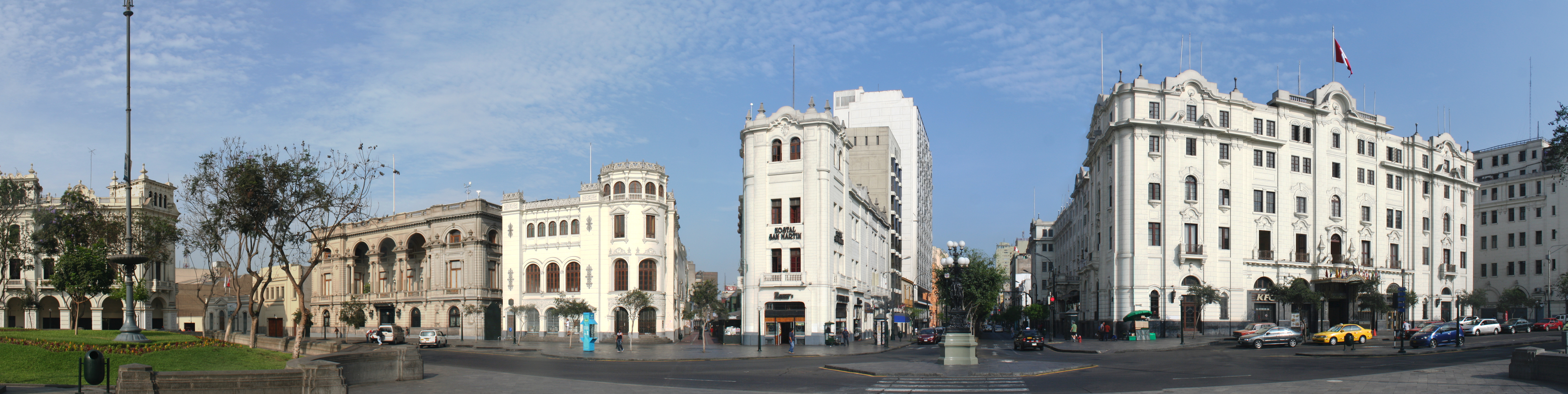
Hotel Bolivar (on the right side)

The construction of the buildings that surrounded the plaza occurred at a gradual pace. The Colón Theater and the Giacoletti Building were the first structures to be built and were erected in 1914 before the construction of the plaza. The other buildings were later built in three stages. The Hotel Bolivar was built in 1924 and was designed by Rafael Marquina, located next to the Lamp of the Three Graces, a 19th century fixture that was moved to the square in 1915. The Zela and Pumacahua arcades were built during the second stage in 1926 and also were designed by Rafael Marquina. The Club Nacional was built in 1929 by Ricardo de Jaxa Malachowski and Enrique Bianchi. In the third and final stage of the project from 1935-1945 the remaining flanks of the plaza were built up with the construction of the Cine Metro, Fénix, Boza, and Sudamérica buildings which were built in the Neocolonial style (similar to the Spanish Colonial Revival architecture).

As a result, the plaza maintains uniformity with respect to its buildings' facades. Its overall appearance is primarily baroque; the buildings, plaza, and central monument all cohere to uniform and specific styles. The architectural style to which most of the surrounding buildings belong to is that of the neohispanic or neocolonial styles within the realm of European derived architecture.

Two buildings surrounding the plaza have caught fire in recent years: the Giacoletti Building, in 2018, and the Marcionelli building, in 2023.

== See also ==
- Plaza Bolivar (Lima)
