= Teatro Colón, Lima =

Cultural heritage site in Lima, Peru

Coordinates: 12°03′05″S 77°02′08″W

Colón Theatre
- Teatro Colón
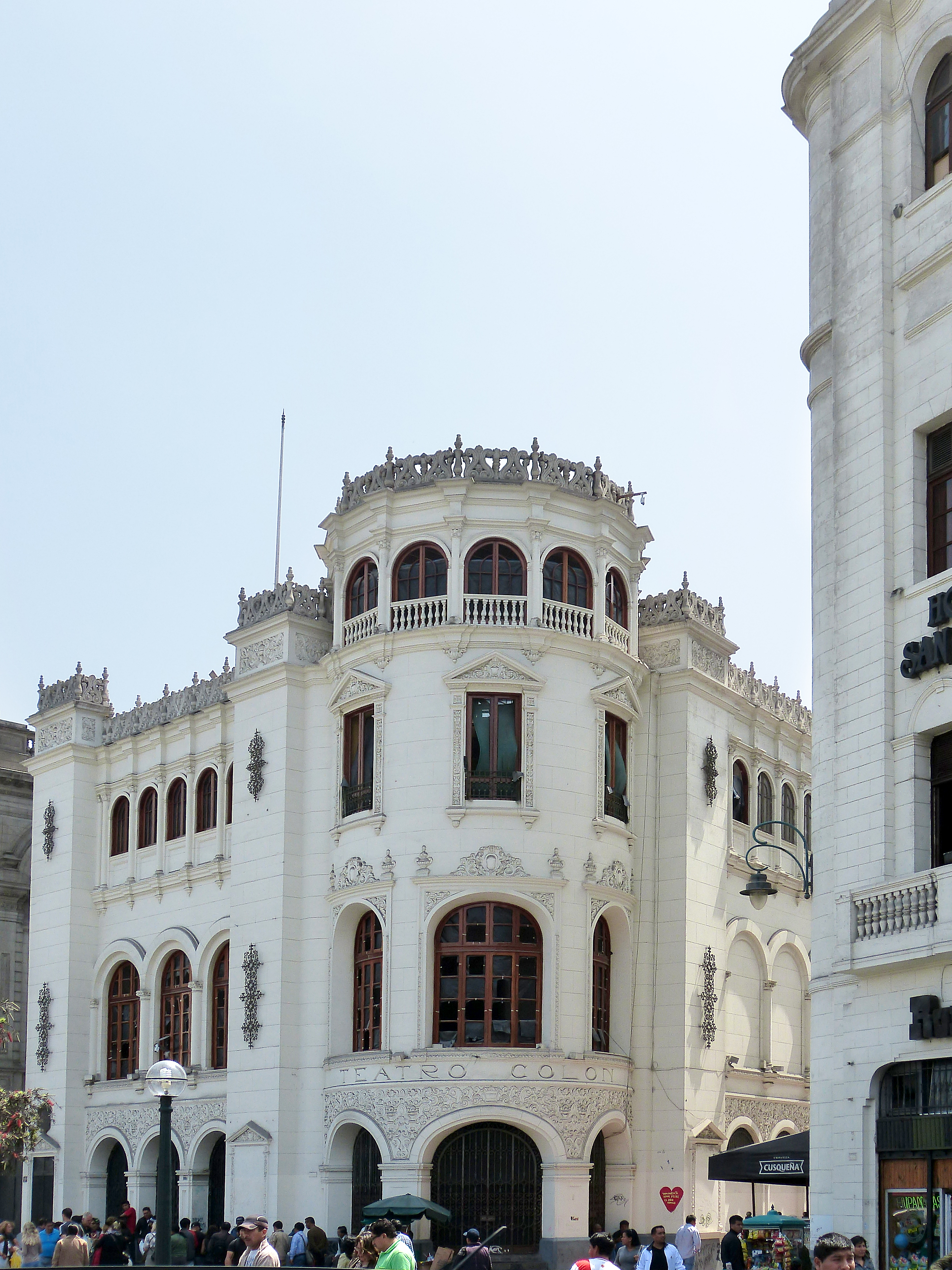
- The building in 2013
- Interactive map of the Colón Theatre area

General information
- Status: Closed
- Architectural style: Beaux-Arts
- Location: San Martín Plaza
- Construction started: 1911
- Construction stopped: 1914
- Inaugurated: January 18, 1914
- Closed: 2004
- Management: Ministry of Culture

Design and construction
- Architect: Claude Sahut

The Colón Theatre (Spanish: Teatro Colón) is a historical building and former theatre located next to the San Martín Plaza, part of the historic centre of Lima. The theater belonged to Teatros y Cinemas Ltda. Its construction began in 1911, being inaugurated on January 18, 1914.

== History ==
Before the theater, it is documented that the land belonged to a man named José Manuel Alejo de Hurtado in the mid-19th century. The ownership of the property changed hands several times until it was ultimately acquired by the company Teatros y Cinemas Ltda. in the year 1911. Thus, the construction of the theater began at the hands of the architect of French origin, Claude Sahut (designer and builder of various works in Lima throughout the 1910s and 1920s).

After the work was completed in 1914, the theatre was inaugurated with its first play, "Los Fantoches", staged by the "Fabregas" Theater Company. This is how the theater offered, throughout its early years, different shows and performances by small theater companies, both national and foreign. However, it is from 1921 that he begins with the projection of films, little by little leaving aside his theatrical aspect to, finally in 1927, dedicating himself exclusively to film reproduction.

In 1936, the theater began a remodeling process: Inside, the independent boxes located on the first floor surrounding the stalls and the high boxes located above them on the second level were eliminated; the dome is eradicated and one more floor is added to the structure. All this in order to adapt it to its new role as a movie theater and to show a more harmonious appearance with the rest of the surrounding structures.

In 1972, the Revolutionary Government of the Armed Forces of General Juan Velasco Alvarado ordered the expropriation of the site. Later, it was declared a National Monument, with which it became part of the Immovable Cultural Heritage of the Nation.

In the 1980s and 1990s, the Teatro Colón became an adult movie theatre, projecting adult films as did other similar venues in Lima, due to both the economic crisis and the decline of the cultural spaces themselves.

In the year 2000 the authorities decided to close the space alleging that "it affected the decoration of the city and the maintenance of good customs". However, the measure was disobeyed by the owners, and, as a result, the Metropolitan Municipality of Lima boarded up the doors and facilities.

In 2004, the Teatro Colón was auctioned by the metropolitan commune and acquired by the Theater Directorate of the Ministry of Culture.

In March 2005, the NGO "Proyecto Cultural Colón Theater" was established, which aims to rehabilitate the totally deteriorated structure of the Theater in order to turn it into a cultural space again.

== Architecture ==
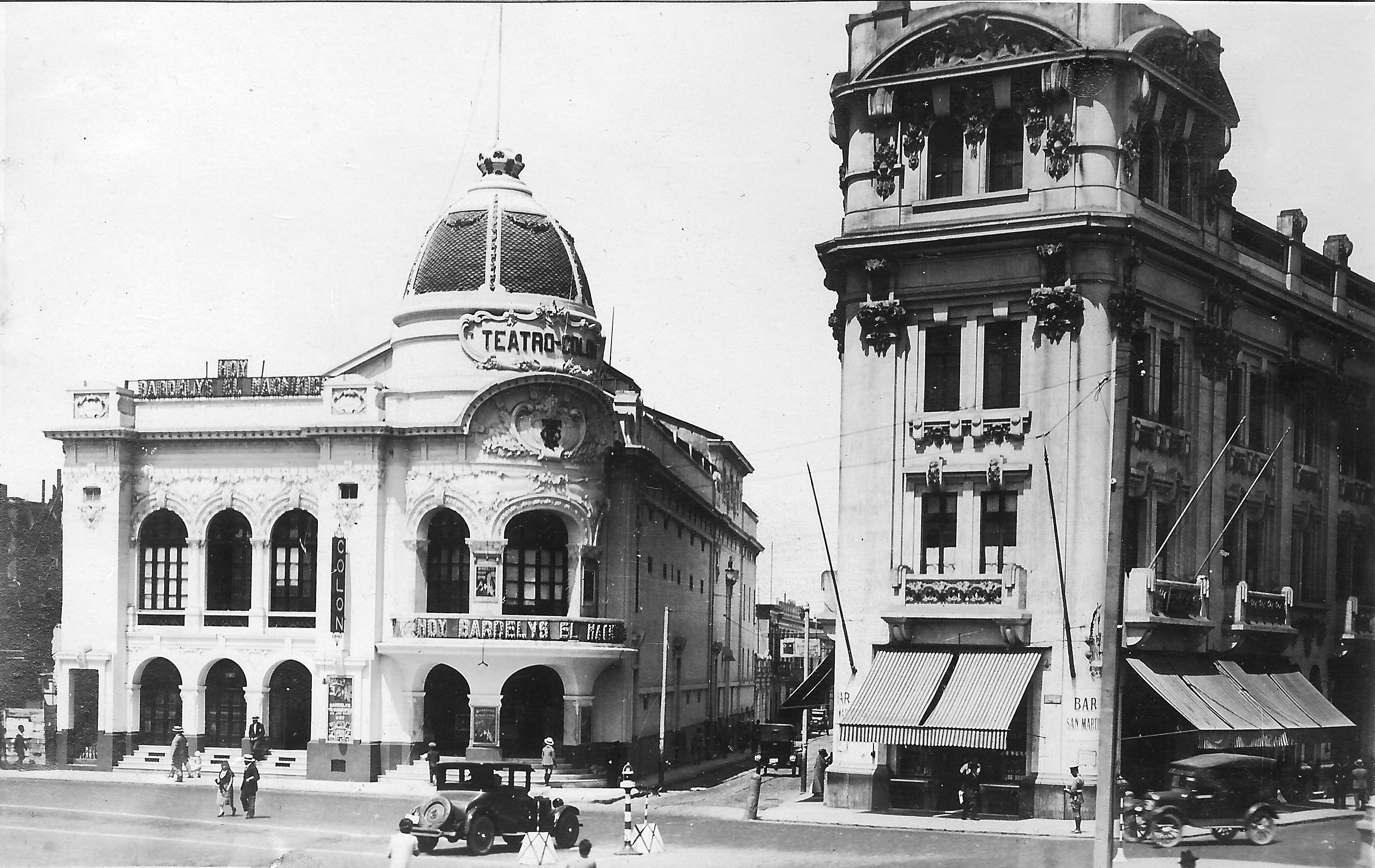
The theatre (left) next to the Giacoletti Building (right).

The day after the Teatro Colón was inaugurated, the newspaper El Comercio published a review about the episode and the characteristics of the venue:

Last night, the Sala del Colón presented a beautiful sight: totally occupied, in all its various sections: the room is small, but elegant, its decoration is simple and artistic, its graceful form and cheerful appearance. And like the Hall, it is the entire Theatre; its façade stands out in soft lines; its wide stairs and the high, comfortable and cheerful hall with a beautiful view over the Plaza Zela (currently disappeared). The Architect Mr. Claude Sahut, author of the work, can be considered satisfied because he has removed from a field, really reduced, an elegant building, which is an adornment of the capital.

Currently, the building is located in front of San Martín Plaza in the Jirón de la Unión, between the Giacoletti Building and the Club Nacional.

In its heyday, the Colón had a capacity for 940 people, distributed as follows:

- Parterre: 305 seats
- Gallery: 400 seats
- Boxes: 217 seats
- Balcony: 18 seats

== See also ==
- Plaza San Martín, Lima
