= Avenida Tacna =

Avenue in Lima, Peru

Tacna Avenue
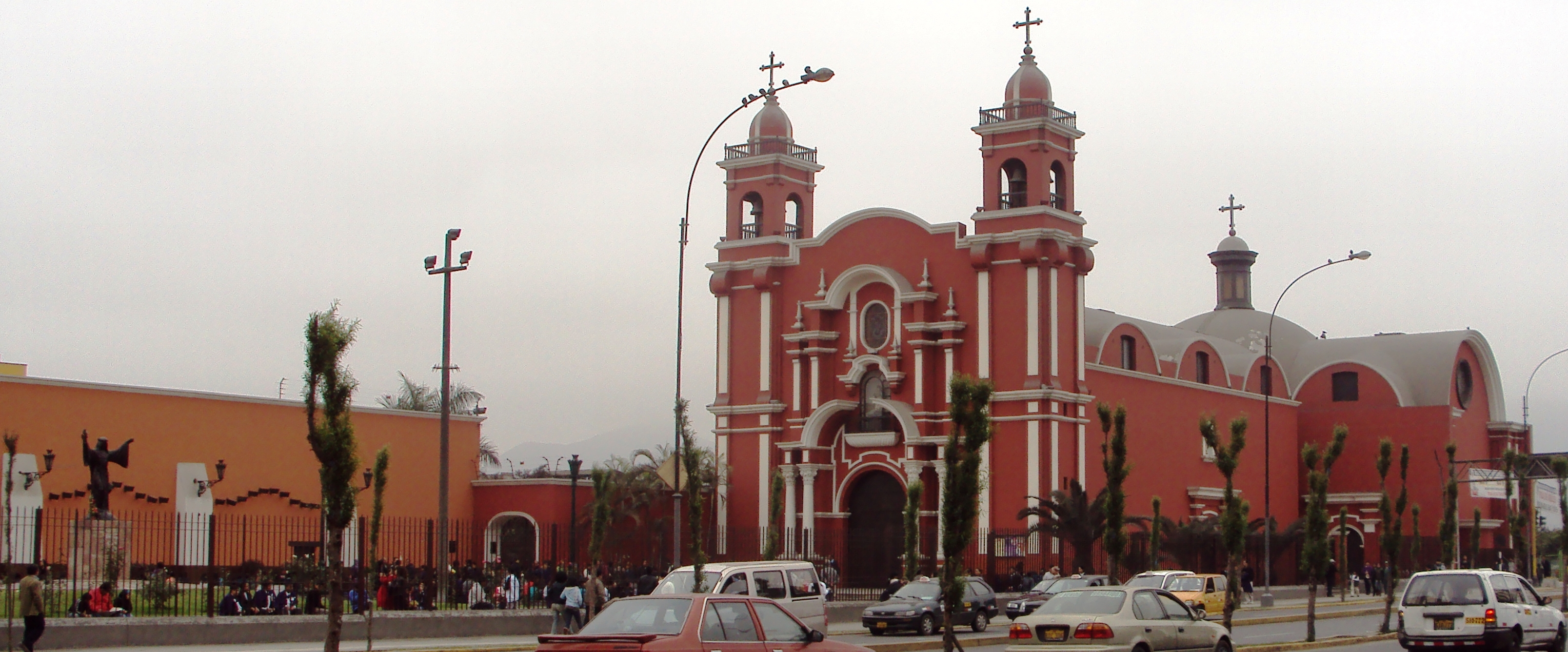
- The Sanctuary of Saint Rose of Lima
- Part of: Damero de Pizarro
- Namesake: Tacna
- From: Puente Santa Rosa
- Major junctions: Jirón Lima, Jirón Callao, Jirón Ica, Jirón Huancavelica Avenida Emancipación, Jirón Moquegua, Jirón Ocoña
- To: Avenida Nicolás de Piérola

Construction
- Completion: 1535

Tacna Avenue (Spanish: Avenida Tacna), formerly Jirón Tacna, is one of the main avenues that surround the Damero de Pizarro in the historic centre of Lima, Peru. It starts at the Puente Santa Rosa, and continues until it reaches Wilson and La Colmena avenues. It is prolonged to the south for two blocks and to the north until it reaches Rímac Avenue in San Juan de Lurigancho.

== History ==
The road that today constitutes the street was laid by Francisco Pizarro when he founded the city of Lima on January 18, 1535. In 1862, when a new urban nomenclature was adopted, the road was named jirón Tacna, after the city of the same name. Prior to this renaming, each block (cuadra) had a unique name:

- Block 1: Manita, for reasons not known. According to Ricardo Palma, a waving hand, in reality an optical illusion, guided people there.
- Block 2: Mantequería/Borriqueras, after the lard-selling stores and the donkey stables there, respectively.
- Block 3: Comesebo, for reasons not known.
- Block 4: Pileta de las Nazarenas, after the fountain formerly located there that belonged to the Sanctuary and Monastery of Las Nazarenas.
- Block 5: Huevo, for reasons not known.

During the 20th century, the road underwent a major renovation after the 1940 Lima earthquake, becoming an avenue. The Sanctuary of Saint Rose of Lima had a section demolished to make way for the renovations in 1959. The nearby Sanctuary and Monastery of Las Nazarenas suffered a similar fate. As a result of the renovations, new highrise buildings started to be built in the avenue. The Gildemeister & Co. building, built in 1928 as the first skyscraper in Lima, paled in comparison to the new construction projects of the post-1940 period. The Edificio Tacna-Colmena is located at the end of the avenue, and takes its name from both avenues.

The intersection with Emancipación Avenue is the location of the Edificio Oropeza, an incomplete building that has been abandoned for over three decades, as well as that of a station of the same name of the Metropolitano bus system.

== See also ==
- Historic Centre of Lima
