= Gran Hotel Bolívar =

Historic hotel in Lima, Peru

Coordinates: 12.0508°S 77.0354°W

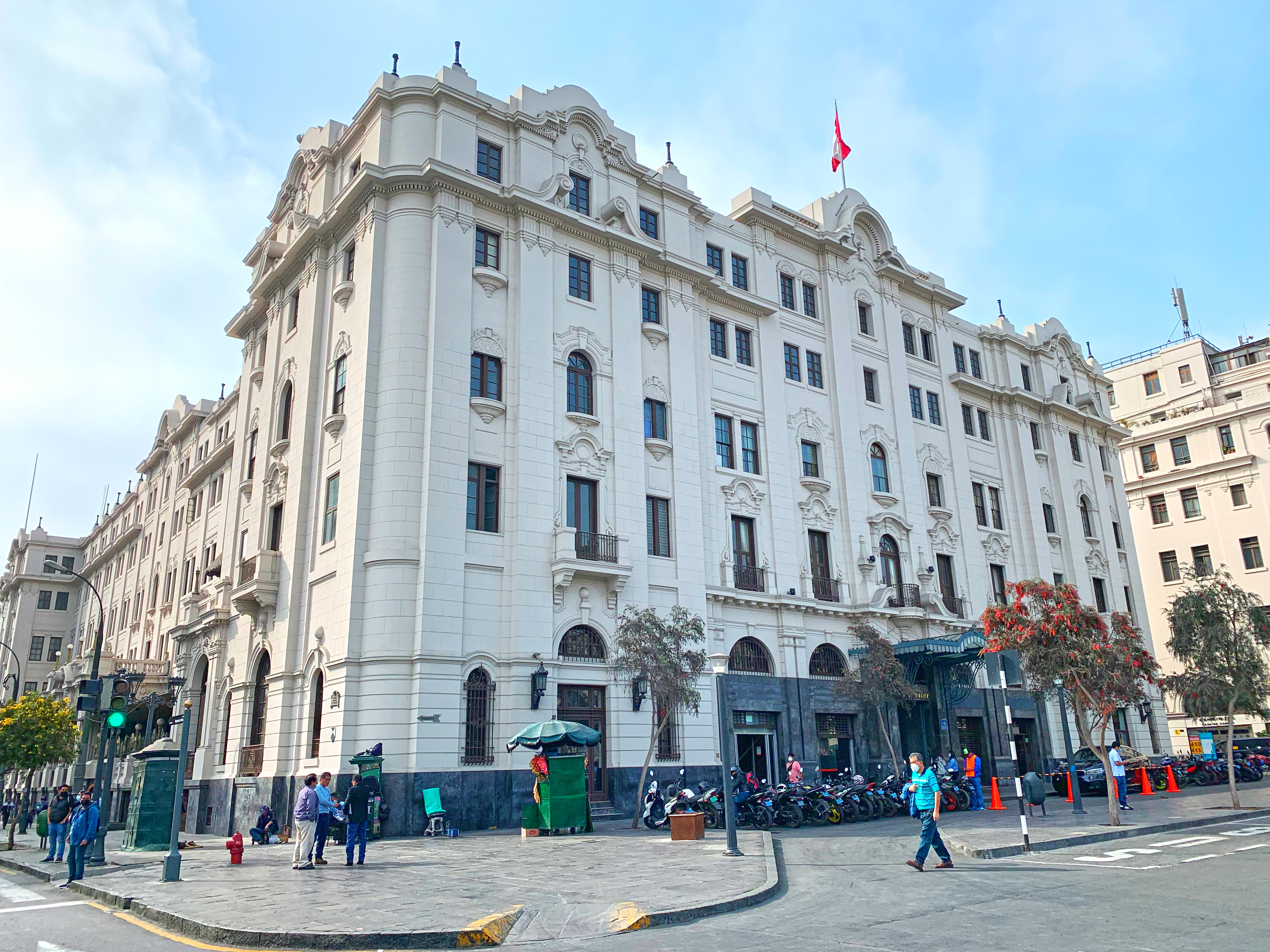
- Interactive map of the Gran Hotel Bolívar area
- Former names: Hotel Nacional (Note: The name was given by the press prior to the building's 1924 inauguration with its official name. It is also erroneously called the Hotel Ayacucho, a name also given by the press originating from a 1973 article by Ernesto Ascher for Caretas, a well-known magazine.)

General information
- Status: Topped-out
- Type: Three-star hotel
- Architectural style: Spanish Revival
- Location: San Martín Square, Historic Centre of Lima, Peru
- Named for: Simón Bolívar
- Groundbreaking: April 1924
- Completed: November 1924
- Inaugurated: December 6, 1924
- Renovated: 1938

Technical details
- Floor count: 6

Design and construction
- Architect: Rafael Marquina
- Architecture firm: Fred T. Ley y Cía.
- Designations: National Monument (1972); World Heritage Site (1991)

Website
- www.granhotelbolivar.pe

The Gran Hotel Bolívar is a historic building and three-star hotel located next to San Martín Square in the historic centre of Lima, Peru. Part of a program to modernise the city, it was designed by noted Peruvian architect Rafael Marquina y Bueno and built in state property in 1924 to be the first large, modern hotel built in Lima, and with the specific intent of hosting foreign delegations for the 1924 centennial celebrations of the 1824 Battle of Ayacucho, a decisive military encounter during the Peruvian War of Independence.

While the square itself was inaugurated on July 27, 1921, the three-storey hotel was inaugurated on December 6, 1924, by then president Augusto B. Leguía. At the time of the 1921 centennial, it was instead the site of an industry fair. It was renovated in 1938, now standing at five floors. In the 1940s and 1950s, the hotel attracted Hollywood movie stars such as Orson Welles, Ava Gardner, and John Wayne, where many also discovered the local cocktail, the Pisco Sour.

== History ==
The site was originally next to a railway station, later the adjacent public square. During the early 20th century, the municipal government intended to widen the Callejón de Petateros with the intent of building an avenue that would join the Plaza Mayor with a projected public square five blocks to the south. The project also planned the construction of new government buildings in this new space, as well as a theatre in the site of the current hotel. Therefore, the site was expropriated in 1906 by the government for the construction of the National Theatre (Spanish: Teatro Nacional). The same happened to the station in 1909, and the terrains were ceded by the government to the municipality in 1912. Disagreements on how to handle these newly acquired spaces started the downfall of the theatre plan in 1913, being ultimately never built.

As part of the extensive renovation works that took place for the 1921 centennial celebrations in Lima, a makeshift building was built on the empty 4,000 m^{2} site to house an industry fair, (Note: Spanish: Exposición Internacional de Industrias) commonly called the Cardboard Palace (Spanish: Palacio de cartón) by locals. This building was demolished to make way for the hotel.

The hotel's construction was the initiative of brothers Fernando and Augusto N. Wiese, who commissioned the U.S. Company Fred T. Ley y Cía, and was designed by noted architect Rafael Marquina y Bueno. The three-storey building was inaugurated by president Augusto B. Leguía on December 6, 1924. In 1938, two more floors were added without altering the design of the hotel. In 1961, Augusto Wiese sold the hotel to oil magnate John W. Mecom for US$ 1.8 million. On December 28, 1972, the hotel was declared a National Monument by the government.

A Kentucky Fried Chicken formerly operated next to the hotel's entrance.

In 2016, the Tax Administration Service (SAT) announced that it would be auctioned off due to the debt owed by Huron Equities, the hotel's administrator. After an agreement was reached with real estate company Arte Express, the auction was called off, as the company assisted the hotel's financial situation through an agreement with its owners.

== Gallery ==
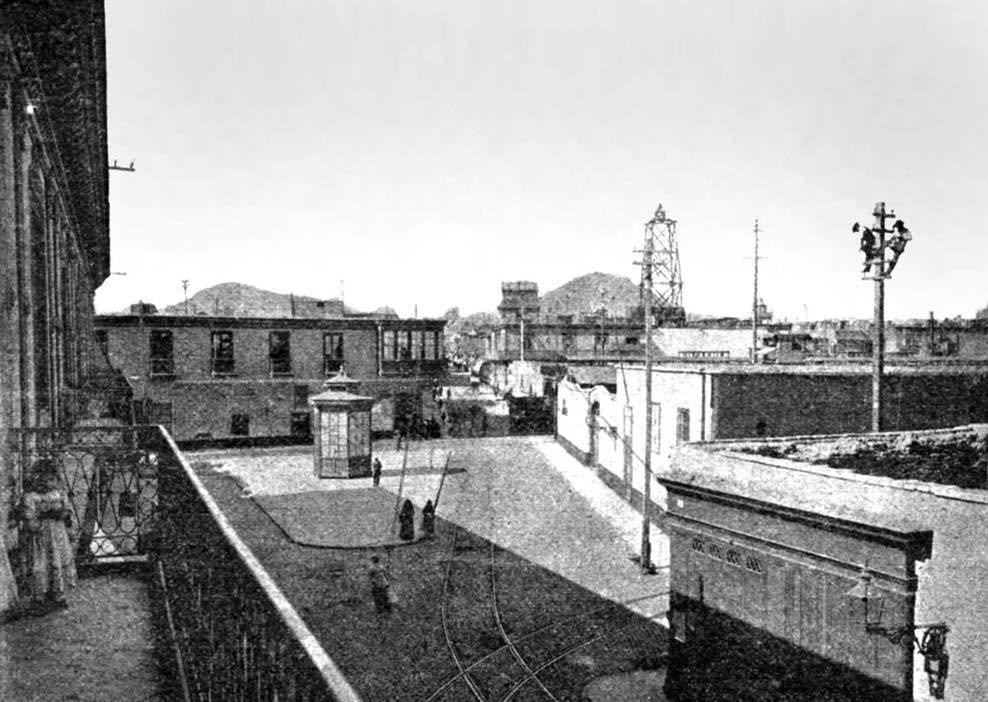
The site of the hotel (centre left) prior to renovations

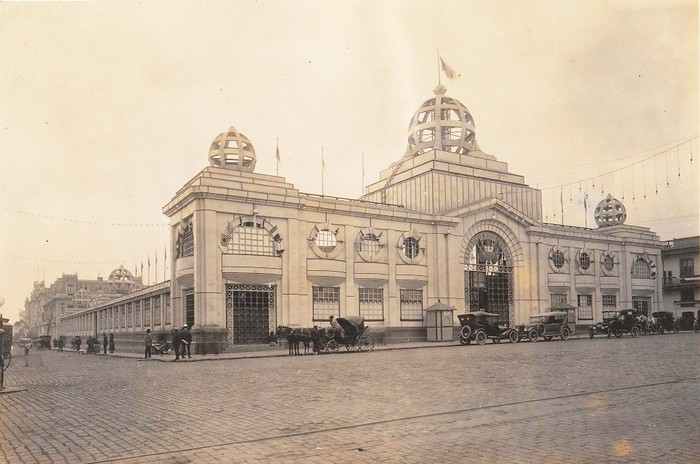
The makeshift palace in 1921

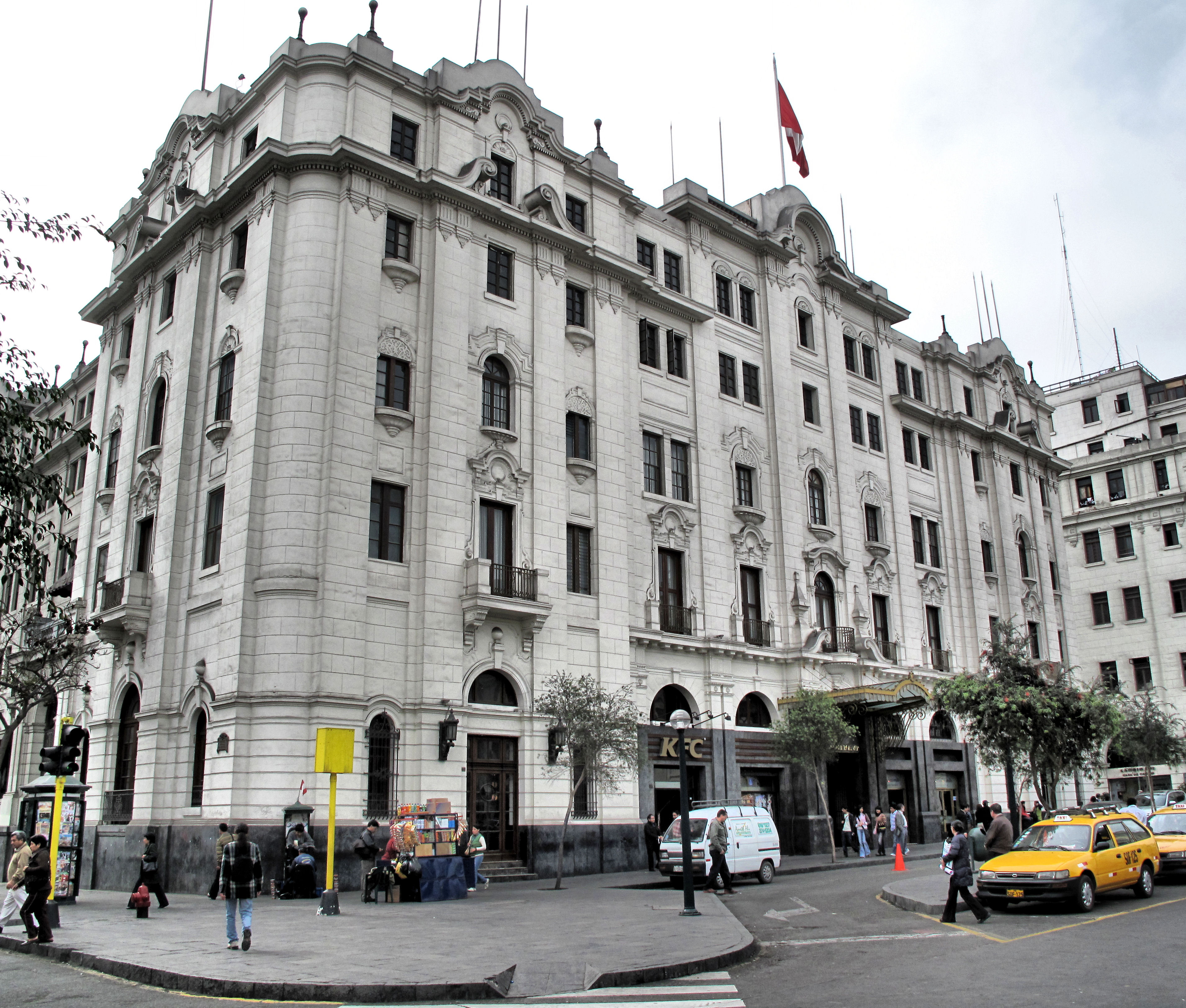
The hotel in 2009

== See also ==
- Centennial of the Independence of Peru
- Plaza San Martín (Lima)
