= Cabildo of Lima =

Cabildo of Spain

- Cabildo de la Ciudad de los Reyes

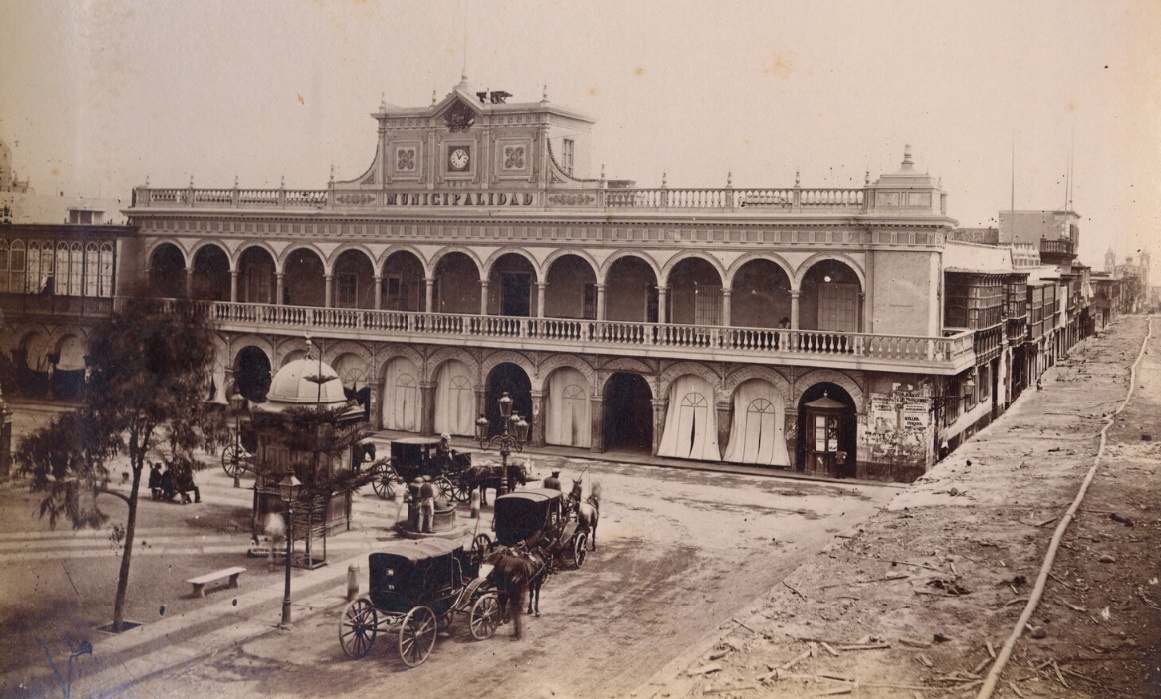
- Former premises, c. 1890s.

Cabildo overview
- Formed: January 22, 1535
- Dissolved: October 8, 1821
- Type: Cabildo
- Jurisdiction: Intendancy of Lima
- Headquarters: Plaza Mayor, Lima, Peru
- Cabildo executive: Alcalde Ordinario, Nicolás de Ribera (first)

The Cabildo of Lima (Spanish: Cabildo de Lima; Cabildo de la Ciudad de los Reyes) was the governing body of Lima and, since 1874, its intendancy. It was created four days after the creation of the city in 1535, existing until its suppression during the independence of Peru in 1821. It was headed by the Alcalde Ordinario.

== History ==
Created on January 22, 1535, the foundation of the city and the constitution of the municipal government was confirmed almost a year later, by the Real Cédula of December 7, 1535. Its functions were administrative, judicial and economic. At the administrative level, it was in charge of presiding over public shows, supervising the cleanliness of the city, organizing the reception of the viceroys, taking care of the decoration of the streets and low-level police. As for judicial cases, they administered justice in the first instance and were in charge of the security police. Among the economic functions, the fixing of food prices and the control of the entry into the city of the necessary merchandise and the administration of income from real estate properties.

The cabildo was headquartered at the palace of the same name, next to the city's main square, from 1584 to 1821.

In 1564 the governor, captain general and president of the Real Audiencia of Lima, Lope García de Castro ordered the suppression of the corregimientos of Lima, Huamanga, Huánuco, Chachapoyas, and San Miguel de Piura, passing his authority to the alcaldes ordinarios of the cabildos. Under the jurisdiction of the Cabildo of Lima was:

- Huaylas
- Chancay (initially Villa de Arnedo)
- Ica
- Jauja
- Cajatambo (initially Ámbar y Cajatambo)
- Canta
- Yauyos
- Conchucos
- Huamalíes
- Tarma
- Santa
- Huánuco
- Cañete (created in 1576)
- Cercado de Lima (created in 1591)
- Gobierno de Huarochirí (created in 1783)
- Gobierno del Callao

The corregimientos were suppressed in 1784 by Charles III, as a consequence of the rebellion of Túpac Amaru II and replaced by the intendencias. With the corregimientos under the administration of the Cabildo of Lima, the intendencias of Lima and Tarma were formed.

During the Peruvian War of Independence, José de San Martín issued the Provisional Statute on October 8, 1821, which established the creation of republican municipalities, which in some structural and administrative aspects resembled the colonial council. In 1839 the municipal government ceased, delegating some functions to the Police Department. The municipalities would be reactivated with the promulgation of the Organic Law of Municipalities of November 29, 1856 during the government of Ramón Castilla.

== See also ==
- Real Audiencia of Lima
- Metropolitan Municipality of Lima
