= Department of Huánuco (1823–1825) =

Department of Peru (1823–1825)

Departamento de Huánuco
- Department of Peru
- 1823–1825
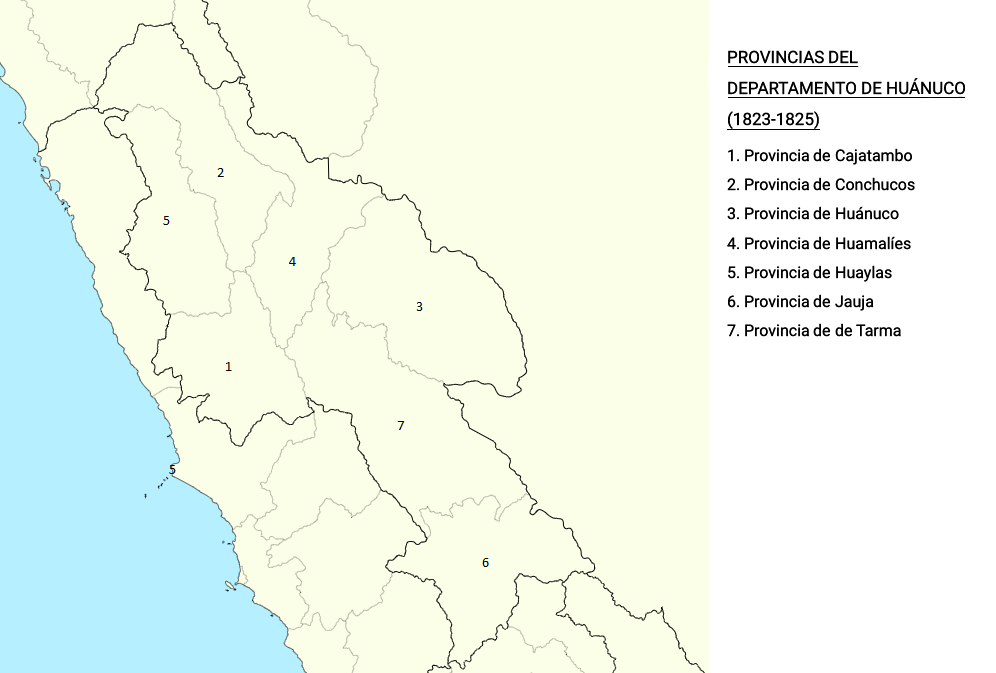
- Provinces of the department of Huanuco (1823-1825)
- Capital: Tarma
- Historical era: Independence of Peru
  - Established: 4 November 1823
  - Renamed: 13 September 1825
- Subdivisions
  - Type: Provinces
  - Units: See list: Cajatambo; Conchucos; Huamalies; Huánuco; Huaylas; Jauja; Tarma
Preceded by	Succeeded by
Department of Huaylas; Department of Tarma	Department of Junín

The Department of Huánuco (Spanish: Departamento de Huánuco) was a short-lived department of Peru that existed from 1823 to 1825. It was the predecessor of the department of Junín.

== History ==
It was created through the merge of the departments of Huaylas and Tarma, both created through José de San Martín's Reglamento Provisional.

After two years and nine months, the dictator Simón Bolívar by Decree Law of September 13, 1825 ordered the separation of the provinces of Huaylas, Conchucos and Cajatambo (with which he created the department of Huaylas again) and would change the name the department, baptizing it as the "Department of Junín", as a tribute to the battle won against the royalist army in these areas that belonged at that time to the constituency of Tarma. Later, the wealth of Cerro de Pasco influenced this city to prevail as the head of the department.

== See also ==
- Department of Huaylas
- Department of Tarma
