= Lost Decade (Peru) =

1980s economic stagnation in Peru

The Lost Decade (Spanish: Década perdida) or the Crisis of the 80s (Crisis de los 80) was a period of economic stagnation in Peru throughout the 1980s which was exacerbated to a severe macroeconomic crisis by the end of the decade. Foreign debt accumulation throughout Latin America, a series of natural disasters, mass public expenditures, nationalizations of banks and financial institutions, and the shutting of Peru out of international credit markets led to a decade of macroeconomic decline. The financial crisis soon became adopted into the public sphere through hyperinflation in commodities, food shortages, and mass unemployment. By the end of the decade, Peru's gross domestic product (GDP) contracted over 20%, and poverty rose to 55%.

The 1980s is often deemed as "The Lost Decade" in Peru, as the result of its social and economic crises. As a result of the crisis, large waves of Peruvians immigrated to countries such as the United States, Spain, Italy, Chile, Venezuela and Argentina. The financial crisis was ultimately subdued during the first year of the presidency of Alberto Fujimori, after a series of economic reforms that attempted to resolve the foreign debt crisis and hyperinflation.

Another part of the economic problems faced was due to the Peruvian government’s fight on terrorist groups, specifically the Shining Path, and rebuilding the damage of bombings from the group (which were usually including bridges, rail lines, and power installations).

== Causes ==
=== Declining commodity prices and foreign debt accumulation ===
Into the end of the 1970s, demand for Peruvian exports declined. In the first half of the 1980s, the values copper and silver, Peru's two largest exports, had declined in price to a 40-year low. From 1980 to 1982, the price of copper collapsed from nearly $3000 per tonne to $1300 per tonne. By 1987, the price of copper had only increased to $1380 per tonne. Additionally, El Niño devastated Peru's fishing economy and led to destructive flooding and droughts in the region of Lima. As Peru's exports value began to decline, President Fernando Belaúnde continued to increase Peru's investment into massive infrastructure projects, including interstate highways, railroads, and airports, increased spending in flood and drought aid, thus substantially increasing Peru's national spending. To pay $9 billion of foreign debt, borrowed an additional $4 billion to make payments, further increasing debt.

Belaúnde was faced by a series of strict austerity measures recommended by the International Monetary Fund (IMF) after the buildup of foreign debt in Peru and throughout South America. Such measures aimed to lower the Peruvian government's deficit through less public spending and increasing government revenue. Belaúnde gave the impression that his administration was following the austerity measures recommended by the IMF, while in reality Belaúnde would downplay the debt crisis as terrorism began to grow in Peru's highlands by the Shining Path. As a result, as economic stagflation began to occur and inflation grew to 60%.

=== Internal conflict ===
Belaúnde initially did not respond seriously to the internal conflict and operations performed by Shining Path, only declaring a localized state of emergency and having the National Police of Peru respond to the crisis. By the end of his presidency, Belaúnde expanded power to the armed forces, which massacred entire villages during the expanded conflict during his administration. Under pressure from the military, Belaúnde authorized the purchase of $4 billion worth of new equipment for the armed forces.

=== Loss of international creditors ===
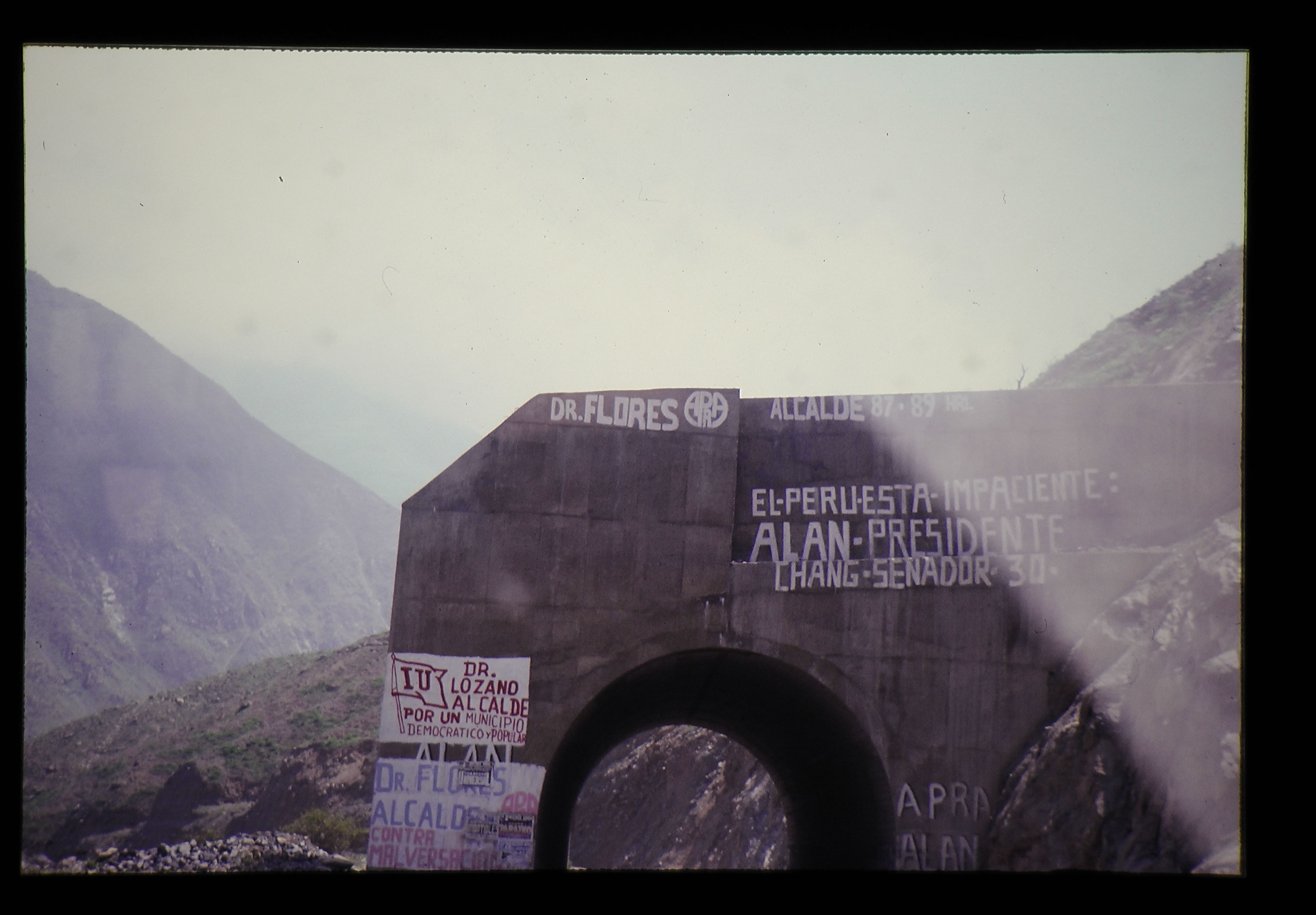
Pro-Alan García graffito in San Ramón, 1988

By 1983, Peru accumulated $13.5 billion (77.8% of GDP) in foreign debt and its gross domestic product had collapsed by 20%. Belaúnde argued that the military regimes preceding his presidency, particularly the military regimes of Juan Velasco Alvarado and Francisco Morales Bermudez, had been convinced by foreign banks to borrow billions of dollars.

Facing growing pressure, Belaúnde visited Washington, D.C. in 1984 in a last effort to beg President Ronald Reagan for help in his bankrupt administration. A White House aide commented that 'President Reagan only gave him half an hour,'' and suggested Belaúnde follow austerity programs outlined by banks and the IMF. Populism began to grow and the International Monetary Fund became a scapegoat for Peru's debt crisis.

A surge in populism due to the crisis favored presidential candidate Alan García's economic proposals that would cut Peru's lines with international investors and banks. Following his election, García ordered the closing of the International Monetary Fund's office in Lima and ordered the nationalization of banks and other financial institutions in Peru. Viewed as a virtual default, investors soon pulled completely out of Peru and the Lima Stock Exchange suffered a significant drop.

== Effects ==
=== Hyperinflation ===
==== Currency change ====
Peru's had switched its currency twice from 1985 to 1990. In 1985, President Alan Garcia introduced the Peruvian inti, a short-lived currency that valued 1000 Peruvian soles. Banknotes were initially printed in values of 10, 50, and 100 intis, however banknotes subsequently were printed in larger quantities due to continued hyperinflation. Peruvian intis were printed in values of 50,000, 100,000 and up to banknotes of 5,000,000 intis by the end of its circulation.

Despite Garcia's attempts to encourage Peruvians to circulate and trust the Peruvian inti, the public turned towards exchanging and relying on United States dollars, leading to foreign exchange controls and the usage of the MUC dollar, a separate currency instituted by the Peruvian government worth identically to the United States dollar, until keeping up with inflation bankrupted the Central Bank of Peru. In 1990, Peru's currency was switched again from the Peruvian inti to the Peruvian nuevo sol as inflation began to decrease. A government initiative offered to exchange nuevo soles with Peruvians intis at the exchange rate of 1,000,000 Peruvian intis. Inflation continued to decline which contributed favorably to the new currency's circulation and reliability with the general public.

Peruvian intis and the original Peruvian sol were ousted out of circulation in 1991. As of 2020, the Peruvian nuevo sol remains Peru's national currency.

==== Price inflation ====
In 1988, the Peruvian government reported consumer prices rising 1,722%, or on average 143.5% per month. The Garcia administration's policy of a self-sustainable economy caused imported goods to significantly increase in price. Pharmaceutical products increased nearly 600% and the price of petroleum quadrupled. In September 1988, economists declared that the inflation became hyperinflation. The middle and lower classes soon began to feel the subsequent effects of the protectionist policies. Peru experienced a shortage of raw materials and food, and long strikes in the mining industry led to falling exports, leading the trade deficit even further and increased unemployment.

==== Consumer prices inflation by year ====
Consumer prices inflation by year

=== Unemployment ===
Peru's fiscal policy in the late 1980s cut Peru off from the international market. As demand for manufactured goods in exports declined, the manufacturing industry began to lay off workers. Wages declined a reportedly 50% or more during the period. Unemployment had reached a threshold over 6% in the late 1980s, both in the country's formal and informal business sectors.

=== Macroeconomic ===
Peru's gross domestic product at the start of the decade (in constant 2010 USD) was $64.7 billion. By 1990, Peru's gross domestic product had devalued to $58.5 billion. It would take until 1996 for the country's GDP to reach levels higher than those in the 1980s. GDP growth averaged -0.72% annually from 1980 to 1990, although growth was mostly erratic in value. GDP growth peaked in 1987 at 9.7% and reached an all-time low in 1989 at -12.3%. GDP per capita peaked in 1981 at $1,203 and reached its low in 1988 at $729, significantly lower than the world average of $3772 in 1988. In 1990, government debt reached 190% of GDP.

=== Civil unrest and revolutionary movements ===
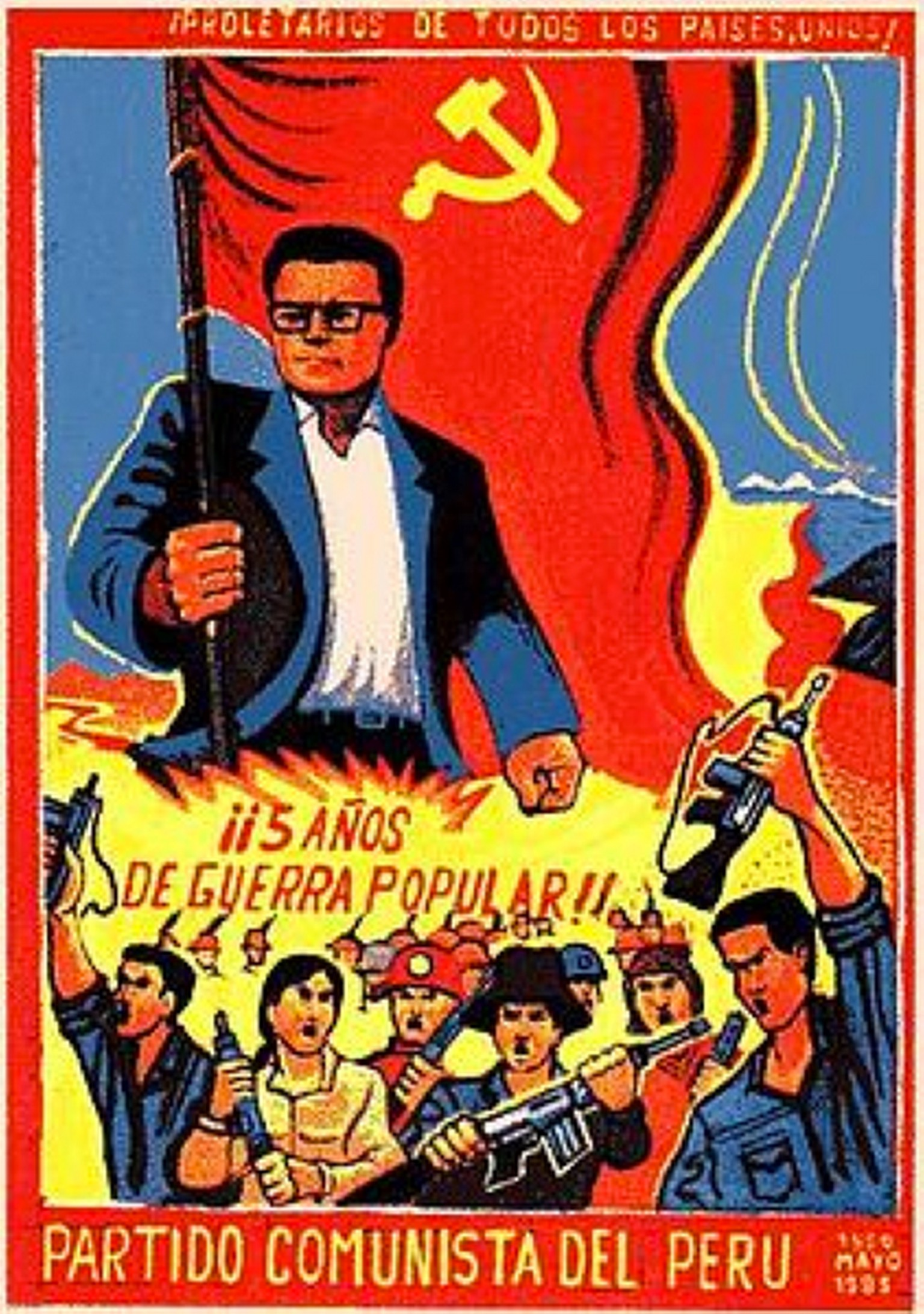
Shining Path poster commemorating "5 years of people's war" in 1985.

Groups throughout the rural areas of Peru viewed the economic crisis as evidence of the failure of a capitalist free-market economy. Socialist and communist groups began to spawn initially through Belaunde's term, and soon began to grow power and the backing of the Peruvian rural population by 1985, exacerbated by unemployment and hyperinflation which directly shook Peru's middle and lower classes.

Data has shown that from 1986 to 1991, under both the Garcia and Fujimori presidencies, there was a significant rise in major social protests compared to the years before and after, including general strikes and riots and demonstrations. The years of hyperinflation were in 1988 and 1989, the same years that had the record number of protest activity in Peru.

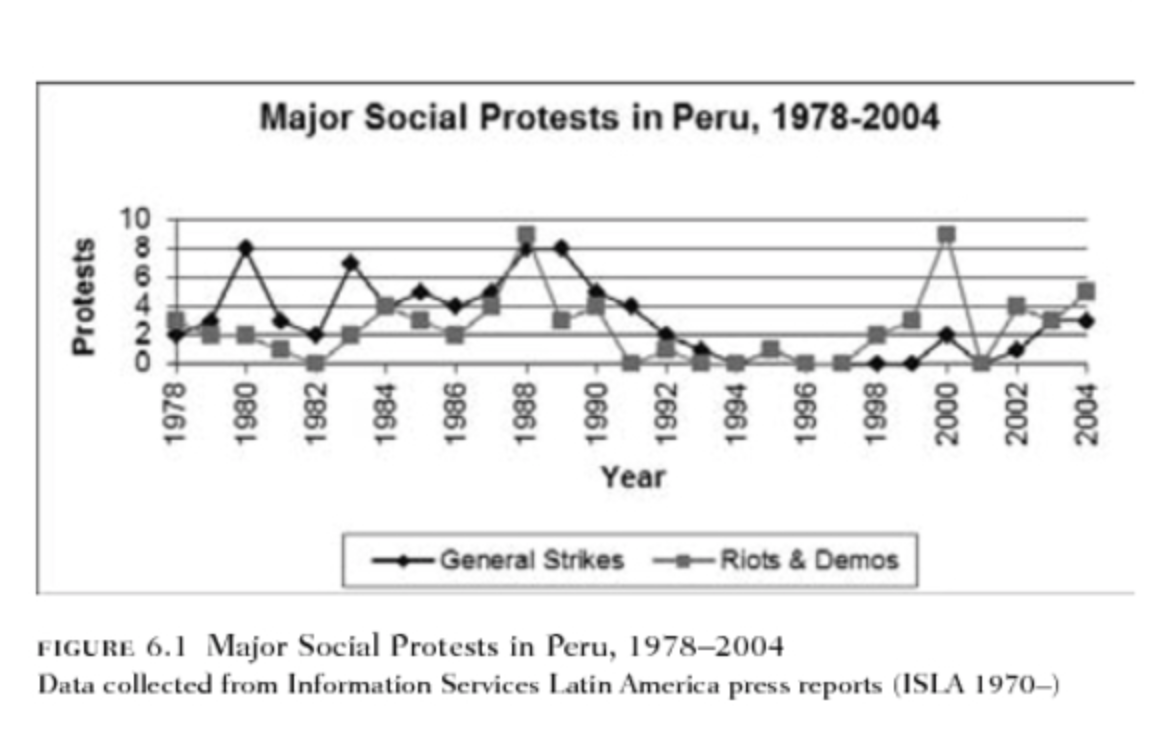
Data from Information Services Latin America press reports regarding the number of general strikes and riots & demonstrations each year from 1978 through 2004 in Peru.

Terror groups, such as the Shining Path and the MRTA grew popular support by promising aid to the lower social classes by shifting the Peruvian economy towards socialism. A number of communist groups, particularly the Shining Path used the economic crisis as an opportunity to advocate for revolution. It was estimated that the Shining Path had some 5,000 full-time fighters and nearly 50,000 sympathizers by 1989. It was also estimated that about 30,000 people were killed during the various violent attacks and bombings demonstrated by the Shining Path from 1980-1992.

The Shining Path, in particular, also became widely popular among indigenous people, as the leader, Abimael Guzman, lectured philosophy and ideologies to communities and gained their support and dedication.

The movement was born in 1970 in the Andean city of Ayacucho and in 1980 began its armed insurgency. Ayacucho was a run-down indigenous town where the majority of people were unable to read or write. In an interview conducted while Guzman was imprisoned, he stated that his "greatest and deepest need was to meet and discover the peasants in Ayacucho". After seeing the living conditions and injustices towards lower social classes, he decided to form his group and left the Communist Party of Peru. He organized many of his young and low-income community members to protest the government, taught them about the ideas of communism, and worked to get them admitted to an educational institution. Through this, he gained a large group of supporters in Ayacucho.

Its success can be partially attributed to the consistent spread of the movement to all of Peru's provinces over 12 years. With the organization explicitly focused on indigenous people (who make up the majority of Peru and also has the largest population of any Latin American State), it also embraced its distaste for elitism and white-washing Peruvian culture. Since it spread throughout Peru and the Shining Path assassinated many government officials, there was little to no federal government control in more rural areas, hence giving the Shining Path control.

When rural and indigenous towns did not accept the Shining Path into their land, they typically were all murdered. Later studies showed that Peruvians who were socially excluded or low-income were disproportionately more likely to be victims of violence from the Shining Path and be exposed to profound ethnic and social divisions in society. This led to an increase in migration from indigenous and rural Peruvians to more urban areas, such as Lima, which overall became so overwhelming that under Garcia’s first presidency, a wall (the Wall of Shame) was built to physically divide those seeking refuge and the elites of Lima.

Under Fujimori’s “crackdown” on terrorism in the Summer of 1992, it was recorded that record numbers of car bombings and other forms of violence were in direct response to his announcement.

Terror groups such as the Shining Path also led to the government imposing new committees and standards of torture and punishment. A sudden rise in the use of torture towards civilians was also prevalent under the Garcia presidency; however, it did not start until 1985, 5 years after the Shining Path became violent. It became such a widespread issue and concern to Peruvians that complaints from all provinces of Peru were reported to the United Nations in a plea for help.

Under Garcia’s presidency, a particular section of the Peruvian Investigative Police was constructed (the Anti-Terrorism Division) in 1987. A report conducted by the U.S. State Department showed that the Peruvian police had tortured and mistreated more than 800 students who were detained. Amnesty International also paid attention to a massacre of 150 prisoners, and if a prisoner survived, they were ultimately still tortured. In this incident alone, it has been reported that 611 individuals died under the Peruvian police control and government. Though the original intention of this “Anti-Terrorism Division” was to seek justice for those affected by terror groups, it became evident that the government also played part in violence.

== Legacy ==
=== Emigration ===
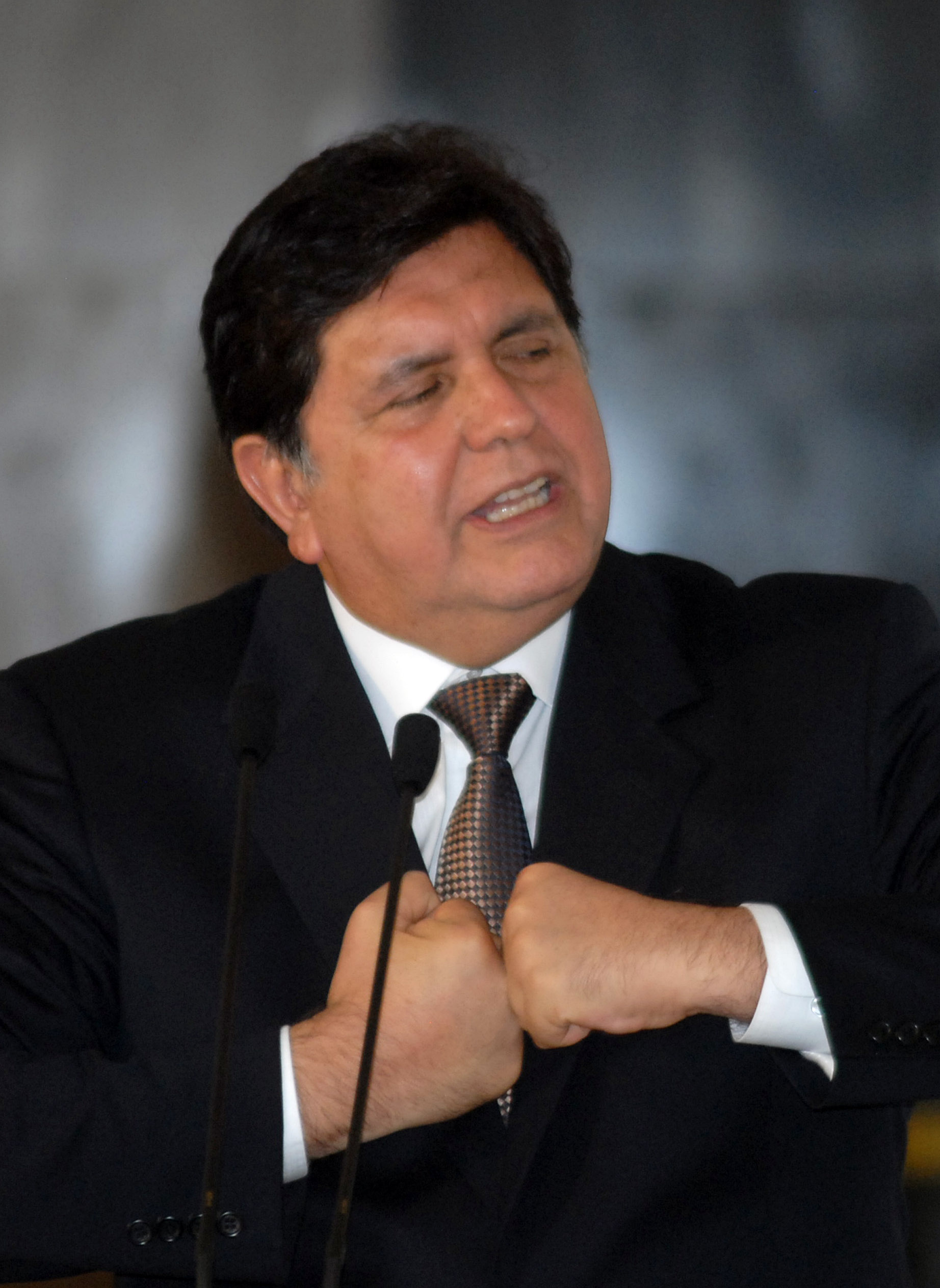
Alan Garcia
President
(1985-1990)

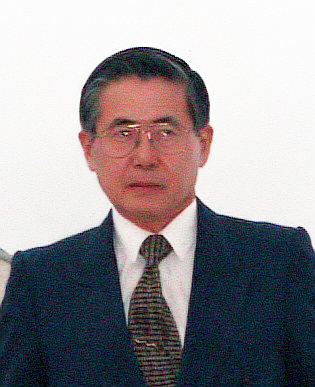
Alberto Fujimori
President
(1990-2000)

The evident long-term effects of the financial crisis in the general public is accredited to starting a large wave of outwards migration from Peru. While in the 1970s immigration out of Peru ranged from 80,000 to 90,000 Peruvians, by 1992, immigration increased to around 354,000 Peruvians leaving the country annually towards primarily the United States, Argentina, and Spain. Record migration out of Peru sparked further waves in the start of the 21st century, where immigration grew to nearly 910,000 and peaked at 1,200,000 in 2007. Currently in the United States, 39% of Americans of Peruvian origins had lived in the United States for over 20 years with a median age of 46, meaning that a vast majority of immigrants had travelled in the late 1980s and early 1990s.

=== Political impact ===
Peru's economic recovery in the 1990s consequent to the Fujimori administration's neoliberal economic reforms has been a major victory for the Fujimorist faction. Fujimorists have often cited the recovery as being a result of Fujimori's fiscal policy. On the other hand, Garcia and his APRA faction have been often accredited with exacerbating the economic crisis during his term towards the end of the 1980s.

== See also ==
- Economic history of Peru
- Economy of Peru
- Economic stagnation
- Latin American debt crisis
- La Década Perdida
- Presidency of Alberto Fujimori
- Hyperinflation
- Macroeconomic populism
- Plan Verde
