= Intendancy of Tarma =

Intendancy of the Spanish Empire

Intendencia de Tarma
- Intendancy of the Spanish Empire
- 1784–1821
- Coat of arms

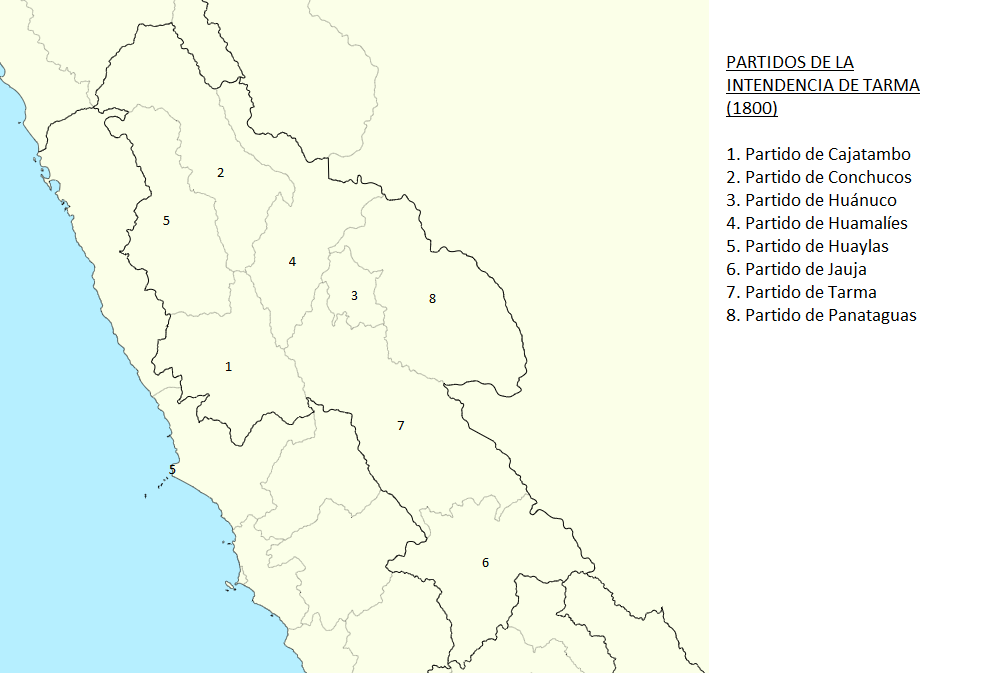
- Capital: Tarma
- Government
- Intendant
  - 1784–1791: Juan María Galvez (first)
  - 1820–1821: Dionisio Vizcarra (last)
- Historical era: Viceroyalty of Peru
  - Established: 1784
  - De facto end: 12 February 1821
- Subdivisions
  - Type: Partidos
  - Units: See relevant section
Succeeded by
Department of Tarma; Department of Huaylas

The Intendancy of Tarma (Spanish: Intendencia de Tarma), also known informally as Tarma Province (Spanish: Provincia de Tarma), was one of the territorial divisions of the Viceroyalty of Peru. The territory was ruled from Tarma. It existed from its creation in 1784 until it was replaced by the departments of Tarma and Huaylas on February 12, 1821.

== History ==
The corregimientos were suppressed in 1784 by King Charles III and replaced by the intendancies. The intendancy system was established in the Viceroyalty of Peru by royal order of August 5, 1783, and the Royal Ordinance of Intendants of January 28, 1782 was applied.

In the territory of the archbishopric of Lima, the intendancies of Lima and Tarma were created. The intendancy of Tarma was made up of the corregimientos of Tarma, Huaylas, Jauja, Cajatambo, Conchucos, Huamalíes and Huánuco. The first intendant of Tarma was Colonel Juan María Gálvez, who took office in 1784, appointed by the viceroy at the proposal of Jorge Escobedo y Alarcón and approved by the king on January 24, 1785. The Panataguas district was created in 1793, the Chavín de Pariaca district possibly created in 1809.

At the beginning of November 1820, during the Peruvian War of Independence carried out by General José de San Martín, the population of the city of Tarma supported General Juan Antonio Álvarez de Arenales, who was pursuing the royalist troops in their retreat towards the Andes. On November 25, General Álvarez de Arenales entered Tarma, being received with joy by the city and on November 28 at the Open Town Hall in the Plaza Mayor. The Tarmeños launched the first cry for independence, the most notable residents of the city signing the act that was published the next day. Álvarez de Arenales endorsed the appointment of Francisco de Paula Otero as Political and Military Governor, leaving the militias of Tarma, Jauja and Huancayo under the command of the Intendant of Tarma.

This Cry for independence from Tarma was very important, because the royalists were not able to reconquer the city as happened in other towns and because it served as a base of operations for the guerrillas of the center, for these reasons Tarma was named Ciudad Predilecta. By Decree of November 24, 1820, José de San Martín granted the Tarmeños the use of a silver shield on the left arm with the inscription "TO THE CONSTANT PATRIOTS OF TARMA."

On February 12, 1821, the Reglamento Provisional, the first legal document of the Protectorate of Peru, replaced the intendancy with the department of the same name and that of Huaylas. Otero was named as its president.

A decree of November 4, 1823, merged the departments of Tarma and Huaylas, creating the department of Huánuco.

== Subdivisions ==
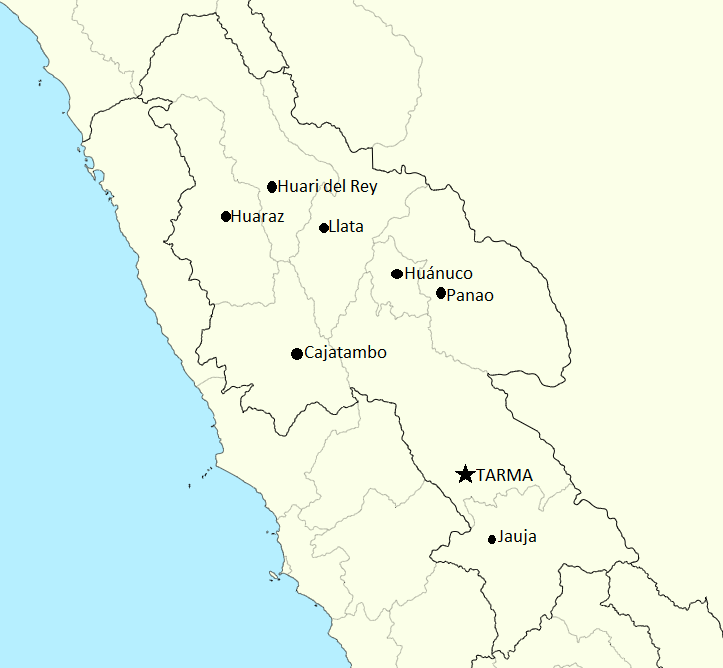
Map of the capital cities of the partidos.

The intendancy was divided into partidos.

Partido	Head (city of government)
Cajatambo	Cajatambo
Conchucos	Santo Domingo de Huari del Rey
Huánuco	León de Huánuco
Huamalíes	Llata
Huaylas	San Sebastián de Huaraz
Jauja	Jauja
Panataguas	Panao
Tarma	Santa Ana de la Ribera de Tarma

== Intendants ==
The Governors (intendants) who ruled the intendancy were:

- Juan María Galvez, Colonel of the Order of Charles III (1784–1791)
- Francisco Suarez de Castilla Balcarse (1791–1796)
- Ramon de Urrutia y de las Casas (1796–1811)
- José Gonzales Prada (1811–1820)
- Dionisio Vizcarra (1820–1821)

== See also ==
- Department of Huánuco
