= Department of Tarma =

Department of Peru (1821–1823)

Departamento de Tarma
- Department of Peru
- 1821–1823
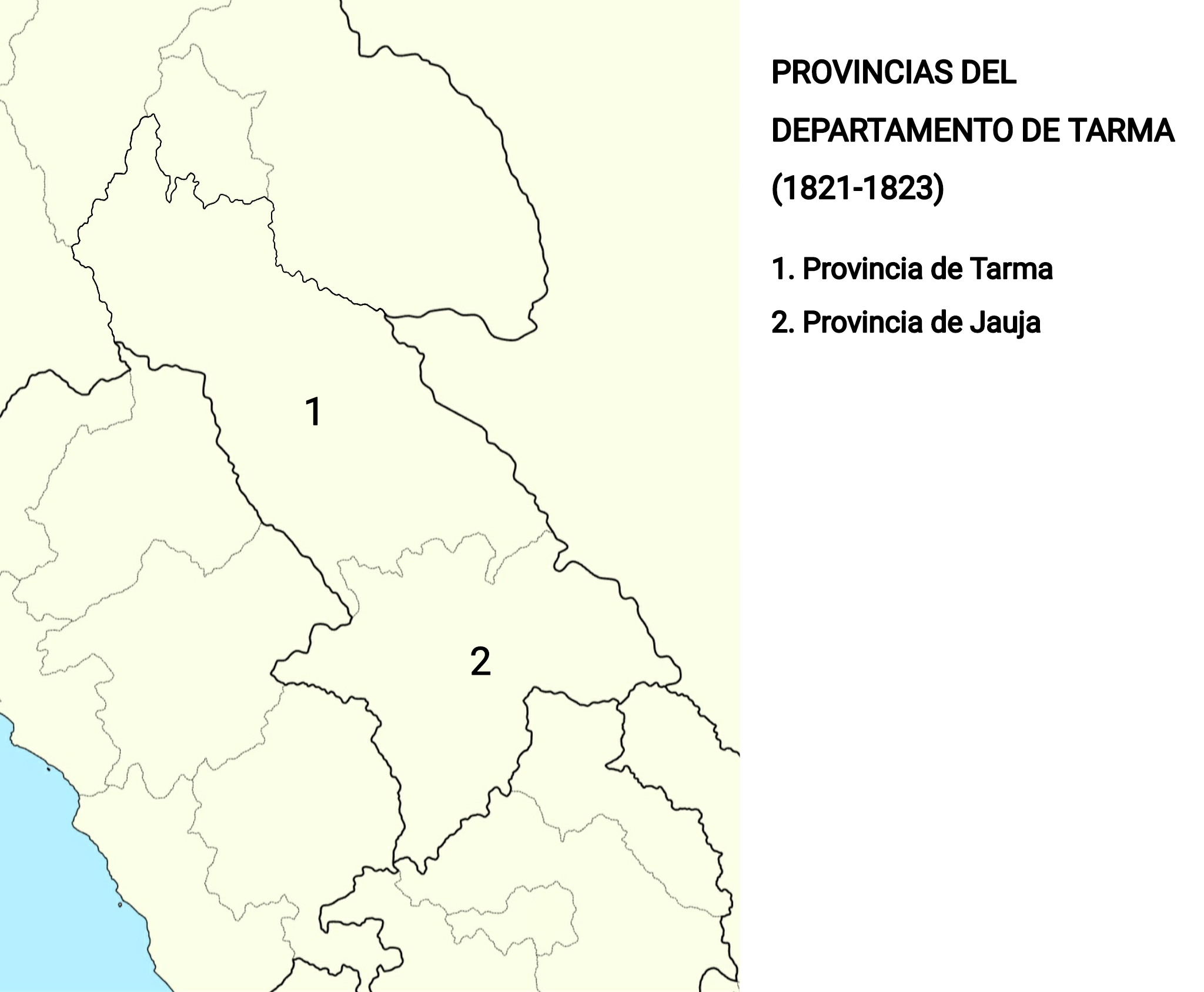
- Department of Tarma (1821-1823)
- Capital: Tarma
- Government
- President
  - 1821–? (first): Francisco de Paula Otero
- Historical era: Independence of Peru
  - Established: 12 February 1821
  - Merged: 4 November 1823
- Subdivisions
  - Type: Provinces
  - Units: See list: Tarma; Jauja
Preceded by	Succeeded by
Intendancy of Tarma	Department of Huánuco

The Department of Tarma (Spanish: Departamento de Tarma) was a short-lived department of the Protectorate of Peru that existed from 1821 to 1823, when it was annexed into the Department of Huánuco.

== History ==
On February 12, 1821, by mandate of the so-called Reglamento Provisional, the Department of Tarma was created in Huaura, integrated on the basis of the Intendancy of Tarma, a territorial district of the viceroyalty of Peru. The new department was only made up of the provinces of Tarma and Jauja since the northern provinces of the old intendancies (Conchucos, Huaylas, Huamalíes, Huánuco and Cajatambo) were grouped in the Department of Huaylas. The city of Tarma remained the capital of this department. The political foundation of this demarcation was carried out by José de San Martín.

On November 4, 1823, during the government of José Bernardo de Tagle, the union of the territories of the departments of Tarma and Huaylas was established, naming it the "department of Huánuco", precursor of the current department of the same name. This decision marked the end of this constituency. However, that territory would return to exist as an autonomous district shortly after.

In effect, after two years and nine months, the dictator Simón Bolívar by Decree Law of September 13, 1825 ordered the separation of the provinces of Huaylas, Conchucos and Cajatambo (with which he created the department of Huaylas again) and would change the name the department, baptizing it as the "Department of Junín", as a tribute to the battle won against the royalist army in these areas that belonged at that time to the constituency of Tarma. Later, the wealth of Cerro de Pasco influenced this city to prevail as the head of the department.

== See also ==
- Intendancy of Tarma
- Department of Junín
