= Huaylas =

Huaylas may refer to the following:

- Huaylas Province - a province in the Ancash Region in Central Peru
- Huaylas District - a district in the Huaylas Province
- Huaylas, Peru - a town in the Huaylas District
- Callejón de Huaylas - the valley of Río Santa in the Ancash Region
