= Intendancy of Lima =

Intendancy of the Spanish Empire

Intendencia de Lima
- Intendancy of the Spanish Empire
- 1784–1821
- Coat of arms

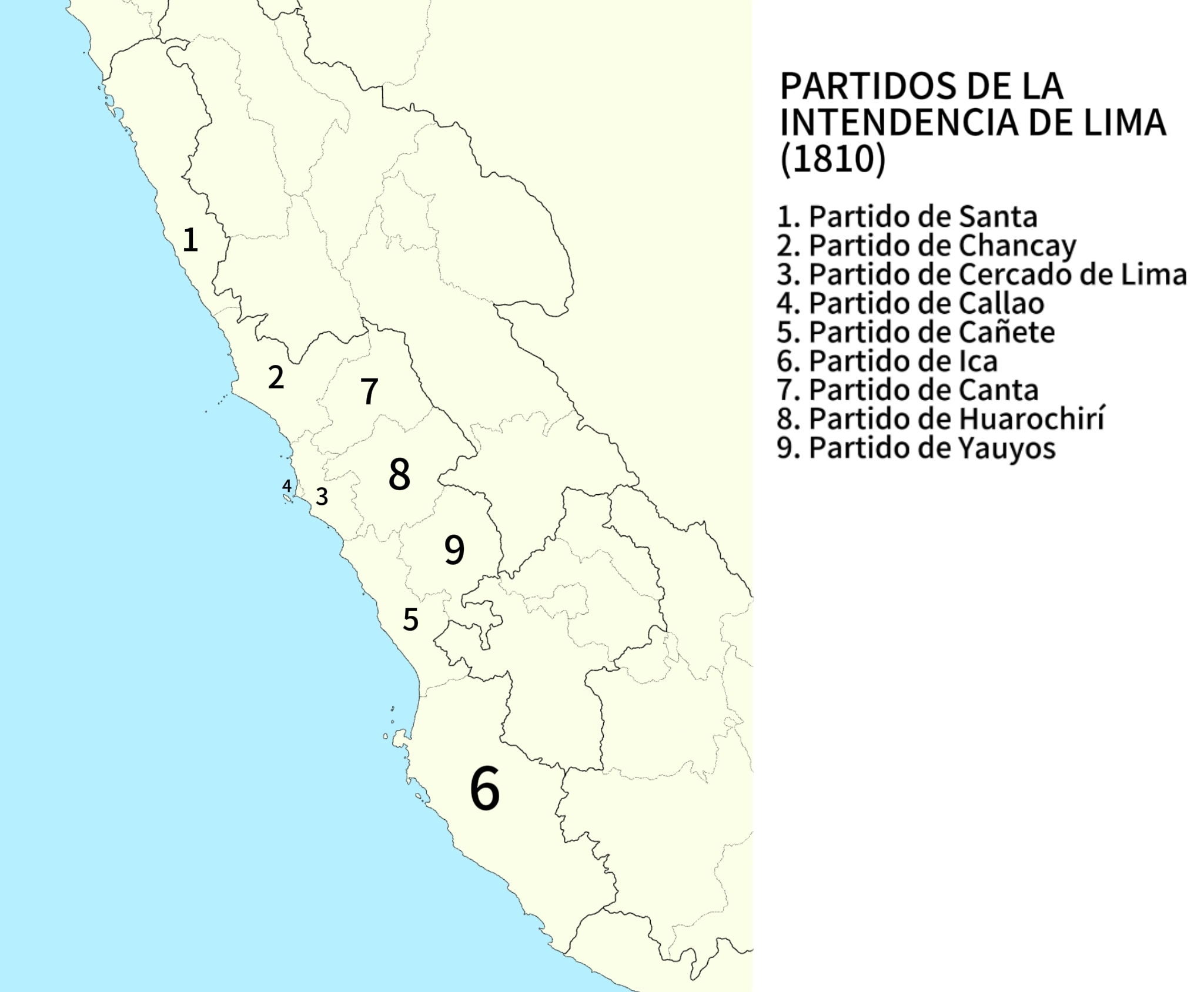
- Intendancy of Lima (1810)
- Capital: Lima
- Government
- Intendant
  - 1784–1787: Jorge Escobedo y Alarcón
  - 1805–1809; 1812–1820: Juan María Gálvez
  - 1820–1821: Bartolomé María de Salamanca
- Historical era: Viceroyalty of Peru
  - Established: 1784
  - Regulations: 12 February 1821
  - Replaced: 4 October 1821
- Subdivisions
  - Type: Partidos
  - Units: See relevant section
Preceded by	Succeeded by
Cabildo of Lima	Department of the Coast; Department of Lima

The Intendancy of Lima (Spanish: Intendencia de Lima), also known informally as Lima Province (Spanish: Provincia de Lima), was one of the territorial divisions of the Viceroyalty of Peru. The territory was ruled from the capital city of Lima. It was created in 1784 and lasted until 12 February 1821 when General Jose de San Martin created the Department of the Coast through the Reglamento Provisional to replace it in the new Republic of Peru.

== History ==
On December 22, 1574, when viceroy Francisco de Toledo reorganised the Indian Corregimientos, which had been created by governor Lope García de Castro in 1565 by appointing native judges, he ordered that the corregimientos of Huarochirí, Huaylas, Ica, Jauja, Arnedo, Cajatambo and Canta depended on the ordinary mayors of the Cabildo of Lima. All of them in the district of the Real Audiencia of Lima. In 1576, Cañete was created, separating it from Ica and the city of Lima. In 1591 the Cercado de Lima was separated from Lima and Cañete. In the 17th century, the port of Callao began to have a military governor appointed by the king.

The intendancy system was established in the Viceroyalty of Peru by royal order of August 5, 1783. The first intendant of Lima (who took office in 1784) was the visitor general Jorge Escobedo y Alarcón, approved by the king on January 24 of 1785. In 1787, the mayor's office was left in the hands of the viceroy until 1805 when Juan María Gálvez, then intendant of Huancavelica, took office, being named on September 22, 1804. In 1809, the intendancy was suppressed, although by 1811 it had been reestablished with Galvez back in office.

The parts of the intendancy occupied by the Liberating Expedition of Peru were replaced by the Department of the Coast on 12 February 1821, proclaimed by General Jose de San Martin through the Reglamento Provisional during the Peruvian War of Independence, and later in its entirety with the creation of the Department of Lima by the Provisional Statute, promulgated on October 8, 1821.

== Population and ethnic composition ==
Ethnic composition of the Intendancy of Lima – (Figures by Haenke based on the Viceroyalty of Peru census of c. 1790).
1. Indigenous or Amerindians 68,131 (44.9%)
2. Mestizos 13,747 (9.05%)
3. Spaniards and Criollos 22,370 (14.7%)
4. Free people of color or Pardos 17,864 (11.8%)
5. Enslaved Blacks 29,763 (19.6%)

The German naturalist Thaddäus Haenke, who took part in the Malaspina Expedition (1789–1794), a scientific expedition organized by the Spanish Empire across its dominions, included in his work Descripción del Perú por Tadeo Haenke (Description of Peru, by Tadeo Haenke) an account of the ethnic and demographic figures (using the terminology of the time) from the census carried out at the end of the 18th century in the Viceroyalty of Peru for each intendancy with their partidos. For the Intendancy of Lima, he notes 3 cities including the capital, 5 towns, 74 doctrinas, and 173 annexed villages, inhabited by 149,112 people or almas ("souls"), composed of 431 clergymen, 110 male religious, 572 nuns, and 84 beatas. Ethnically, the population included 22,370 white Spaniards (peninsulares and criollos), 68,131 Indians (Native Americans), 13,747 mestizos, 17,864 free pardos (Afro-Peruvians), and 29,763 enslaved blacks, distributed across the eight partidos (subdivisions) that composed it. However, the total by strata adds up to 151,695 people, which may be due to errors at the time in compiling and reconciling the figures of each partido. Despite this, it provides a close approximation of the society of that period, concluding that a considerable proportion, almost half of the population, was indigenous or Amerindian (44.91%), both in coastal regions and in the highlands. They were followed by a large group of Afro-descendants (31.4%), by far the highest proportion in the entire Peruvian viceroyalty, composed of 11.78% free pardos and 19.62% enslaved blacks, concentrated especially in the partidos of Lima (including the capital) and Ica. Next came a significant minority of white Spaniards (14.75%), including both peninsulares and resident criollos, who were largely concentrated in the capital. Finally, there was a smaller proportion of mestizos (9.06%), comparatively low when contrasted with other intendancies and with the rest of the social strata.

== Subdivisions ==
The intendancy was divided into nine partidos.

Partido	Head (city of government)
Lima	Ciudad de los Reyes
Ica	Villa de Valverde
Cañete	San Vicente de Cañete
Amedo	Villa de Arnedo
Santa	Santa María de la Parrilla
Canta	Canta
Yauyos	Yauyos
Huarochirí	Huarochirí
Callao	Callao

== Intendants ==
The Governors (intendants) who ruled the intendancy of Lima were:

- Jorge Escobedo y Alarcón (1784–1787)
- Colonel Juan María Galvez (1805–1809; 1811–1820)
- Bartolomé María de Salamanca (1820–1821)

== See also ==
- Cabildo of Lima
- Department of Lima
- Province of Lima
