= Poverty in Peru =

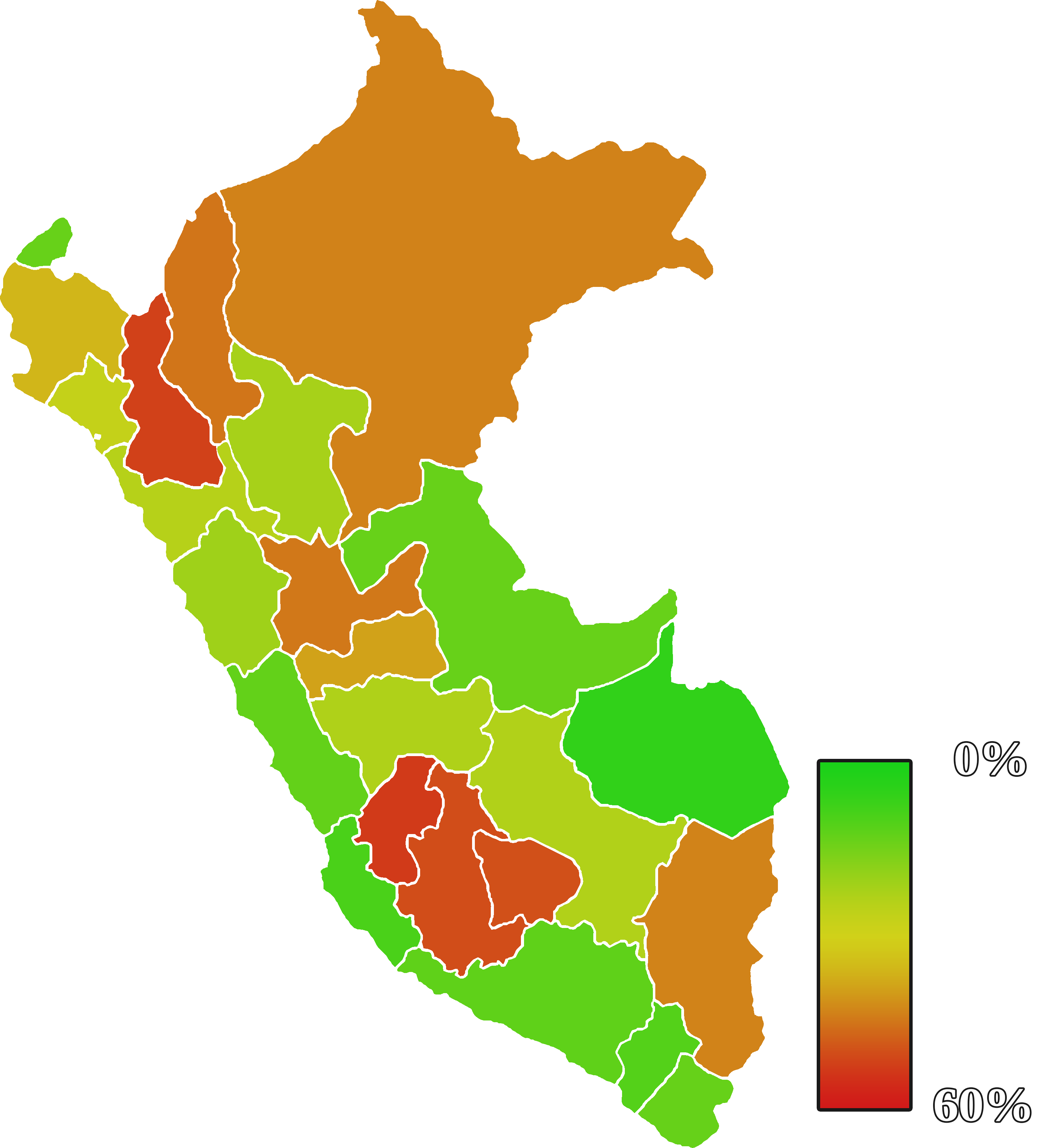
The colors represent the percent of the population in poverty: blue, less than 10%; green, 10–20%; yellow, 20–40%; orange, 40–60%; red, over 60%.

Poverty in Peru has rapidly declined since the start of the 21st century, as a result of prosperity from the international market, tourism, low inflation, greater economic opportunities, and neoliberal economic policy, at one of the fastest rates in South America. Poverty decreased from 58.7% in 2004 to 20.5% in 2018, or from 14.9 million people in poverty to fewer than 6.8 million people in 2018, with millions of Peruvians rising out of poverty according to the Instituto Nacional de Estadística e Informática (INEI). In 2019 the poverty rate decreased with another 1,7%.

As of 2018, 20.5% of the population of Peru is at or below the poverty line, constituting around 6,765,000 people. Only 2.8% (~924,000 people) of the Peruvian population find themselves in extreme poverty. According to the INEI, extreme poverty is defined as individuals who earn less than US$80 per month (S./264 PEN), and the minimum living wage is defined as US$415 per month.

Poverty in Peru is especially present in underdeveloped and most inland regions of Peru, particularly Huancavelica and Cajamarca, as a result of little economic opportunity and availability of capital in those regions. Areas with a high development index, such as Lima, Moquegua and Ica, enjoy relatively low poverty as a result of economic opportunity.

Peru is one of the countries in the world that has seen the fastest reduction of poverty, partly due to sound economic policy and growth.

However, in 2020, Peru's poverty rate increased due to the COVID-19 pandemic.

== Unemployment and social mobility ==
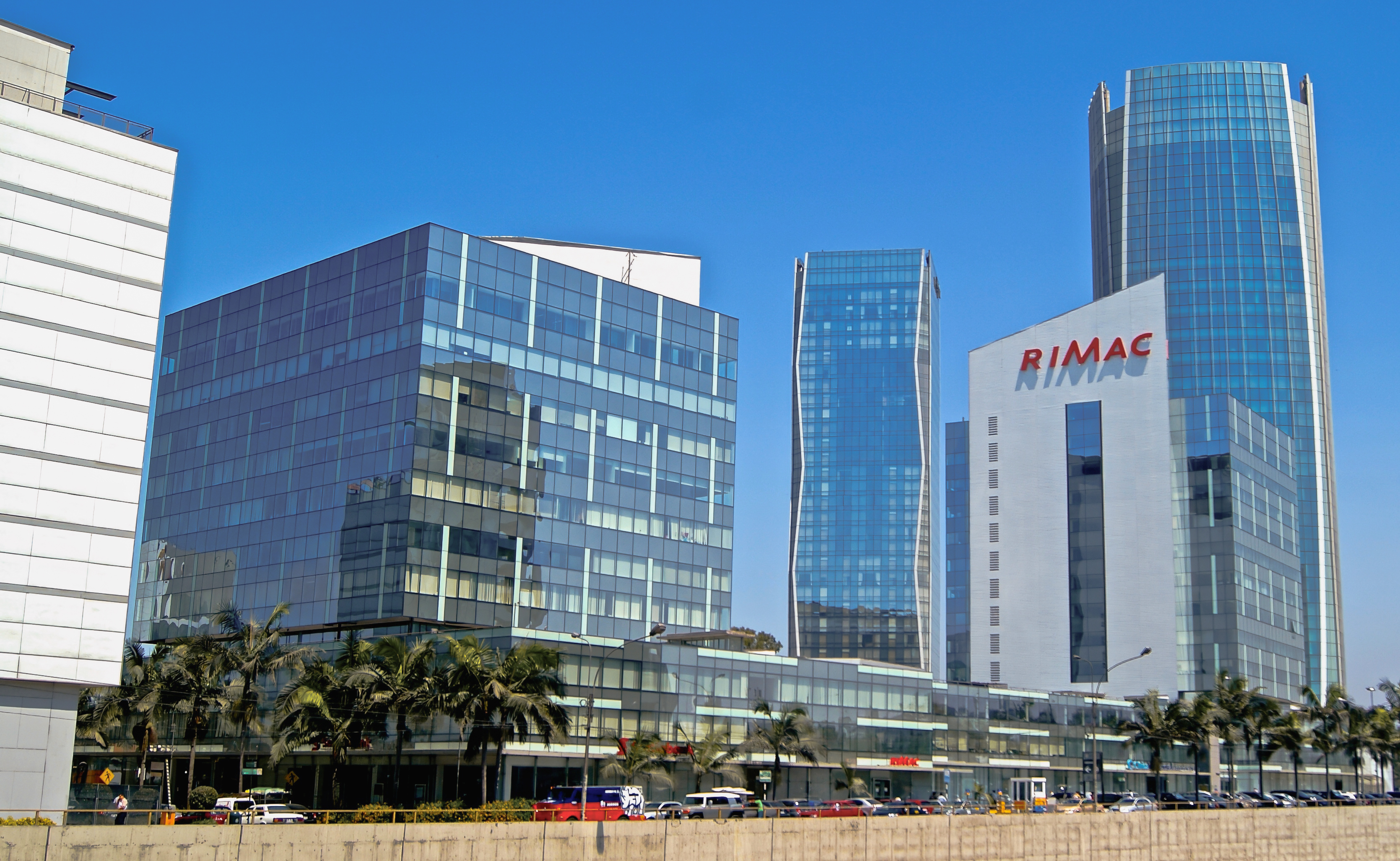
San Isidro, a district in Lima, is one of the economic sector powerhouses that boosts employment and curtails poverty in Lima.

Peru's National Institute of Informational Data (INEI) reported around 686,300 able Peruvians as unemployed.

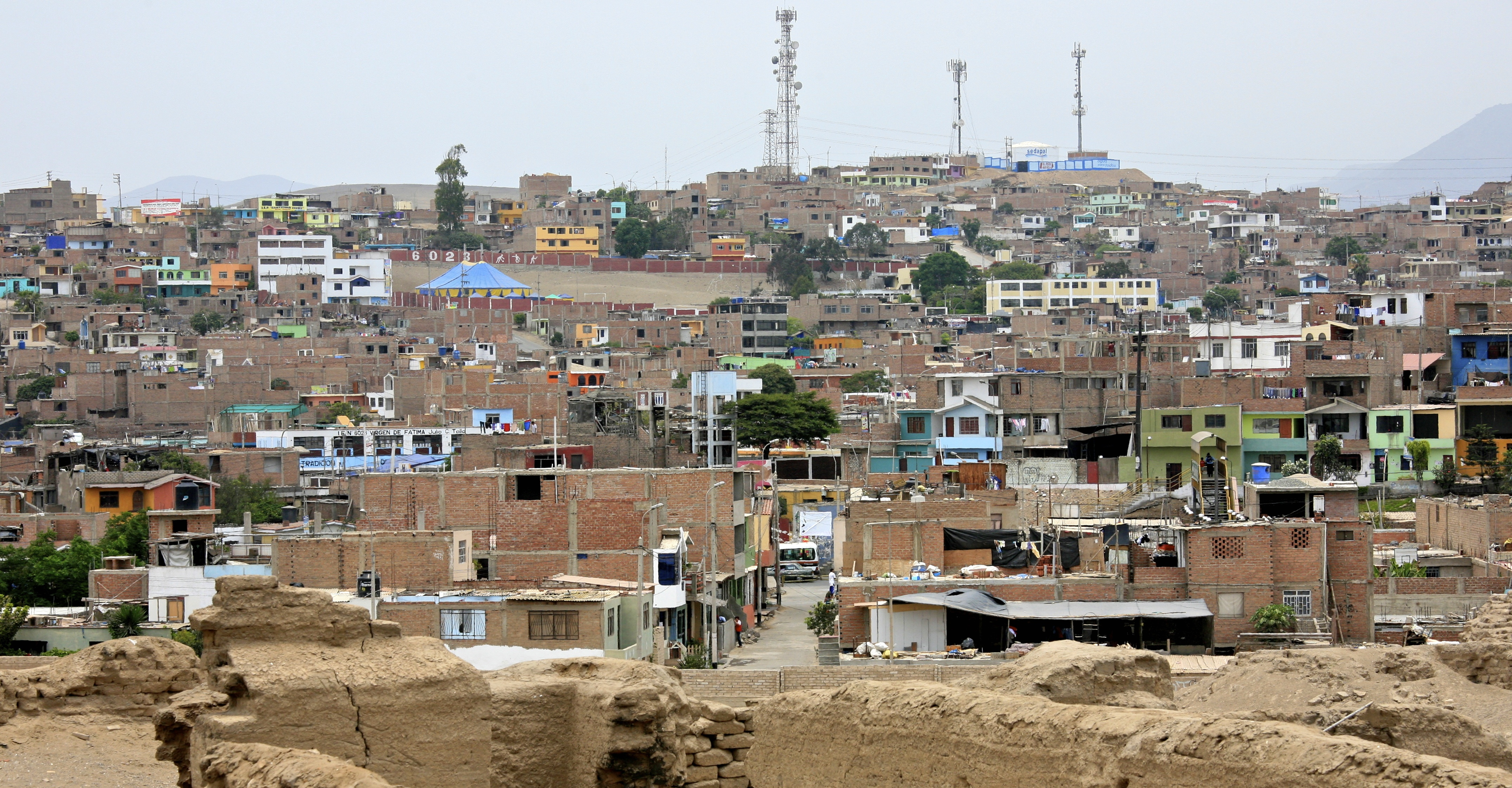
Outskirts and economic slums of Lima, Peru, where most of poverty in Lima is concentrated

== Other dimensions of poverty ==
Basic access to utilities has relatively improved in Peru throughout since 2000, as seen through the percentage of the population lacking basic utilities declining.

Percent of population without access to utilities
Year	Water	Basic Sanitation	Overcrowdedness
2007	28.0%	42.0%	12.3%
2008	27.6%	40.4%	11.6%
2009	25.9%	38.3%	11.0%
2010	23.8%	36.4%	9.6%
2011	23.2%	34.9%	9.6%
2012	17.7%	33.4%	8.9%
2013	16.9%	33.0%	8.3%
2014	14.3%	32.3%	7.6%
2015	14.2%	31.5%	7.4%
2016	12.0%	30.6%	7.3%
2017	12.0%	29.7%	7.0%
Source: INEI (2017)

== See also ==
- List of regions of Peru by population
- List of cities in Peru
- Peru
