= List of cities in Peru =

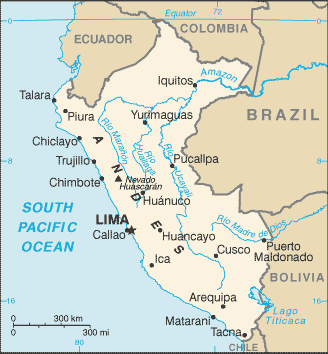
Map of Peru

This is a list of cities in Peru by population. For metropolitan areas see List of metropolitan areas of Peru.

== List ==
#	Image	City	Department	2017 population	2025 population (proj.)
1		Lima	Lima	9,562,280	10,353,700
2		Arequipa	Arequipa	1,008,290	1,195,700
3		Callao	Callao	994,494	1,226,200
4		Trujillo	La Libertad	919,899	1,063,700
5		Chiclayo	Lambayeque	552,508	618,600
6		Piura	Piura	473,025	598,200
7		Huancayo	Junín	456,250	571,000
8		Cusco	Cusco	428,450	497,200
9		Chimbote	Ancash	381,513	413,800
10		Iquitos	Loreto	377,609	461,500
11		Tacna	Tacna	293,119	332,400
12		Juliaca	Puno	273,882	347,800
13		Ica	Ica	244,399	369,500
14		Cajamarca	Cajamarca	226,031	259,400
15		Pucallpa	Ucayali	211,651	437,600
16		Sullana	Piura	201,302	210,500
17		Ayacucho	Ayacucho	180,766	266,800
18		Chincha Alta	Ica	177,219	226,200
19		Huánuco	Huánuco	175,068	246,300
20		Huacho	Lima	153,728	195,600
21		Tarapoto	San Martín	144,186	182,300
22		Puno	Puno	140,839	141,200
23		Paita	Piura	135,422	—
24		Huaraz	Áncash	127,041	147,200
25		Tumbes	Tumbes	111,595	110,100
26		Pisco	Ica	104,656	—
27		Huaral	Lima	96,468	—
28		Jaén	Cajamarca	93,631	—
29		Moyobamba	San Martín	86,015	—
30		San Vicente de Cañete	Lima	85,533	—
31		Puerto Maldonado	Madre de Dios	74,494	130,100
32		Catacaos	Piura	70,590	—
33		Moquegua	Moquegua	67,428	—
34		Cerro de Pasco	Pasco	66,272	—
35		Barranca	Lima	63,812	—
36		Yurimaguas	Loreto	63,427	—
37		Chancay	Lima	63,378	—
38		Andahuaylas	Apurímac	63,654	—
39		Ilo	Moquegua	59,572	—
40		Talara	Piura	59,682	104,700
41		Abancay	Apurímac	58,741	—
42		Lambayeque	Lambayeque	58,564	—
43		Chulucanas	Piura	57,380	—
44		Tingo María	Huánuco	56,932	—
45		Sicuani	Cusco	55,000	—
46		Huancavelica	Huancavelica	47,866	—
47		Ferreñafe	Lambayeque	47,087	—
48		Chepén	La Libertad	45,897	—
49		Pacasmayo	La Libertad	43,356	—
50		Tarma	Junín	42,569	—

== See also ==
- List of metropolitan areas of Peru
- List of regions by population of Peru
