= List of regions of Peru by Human Development Index =

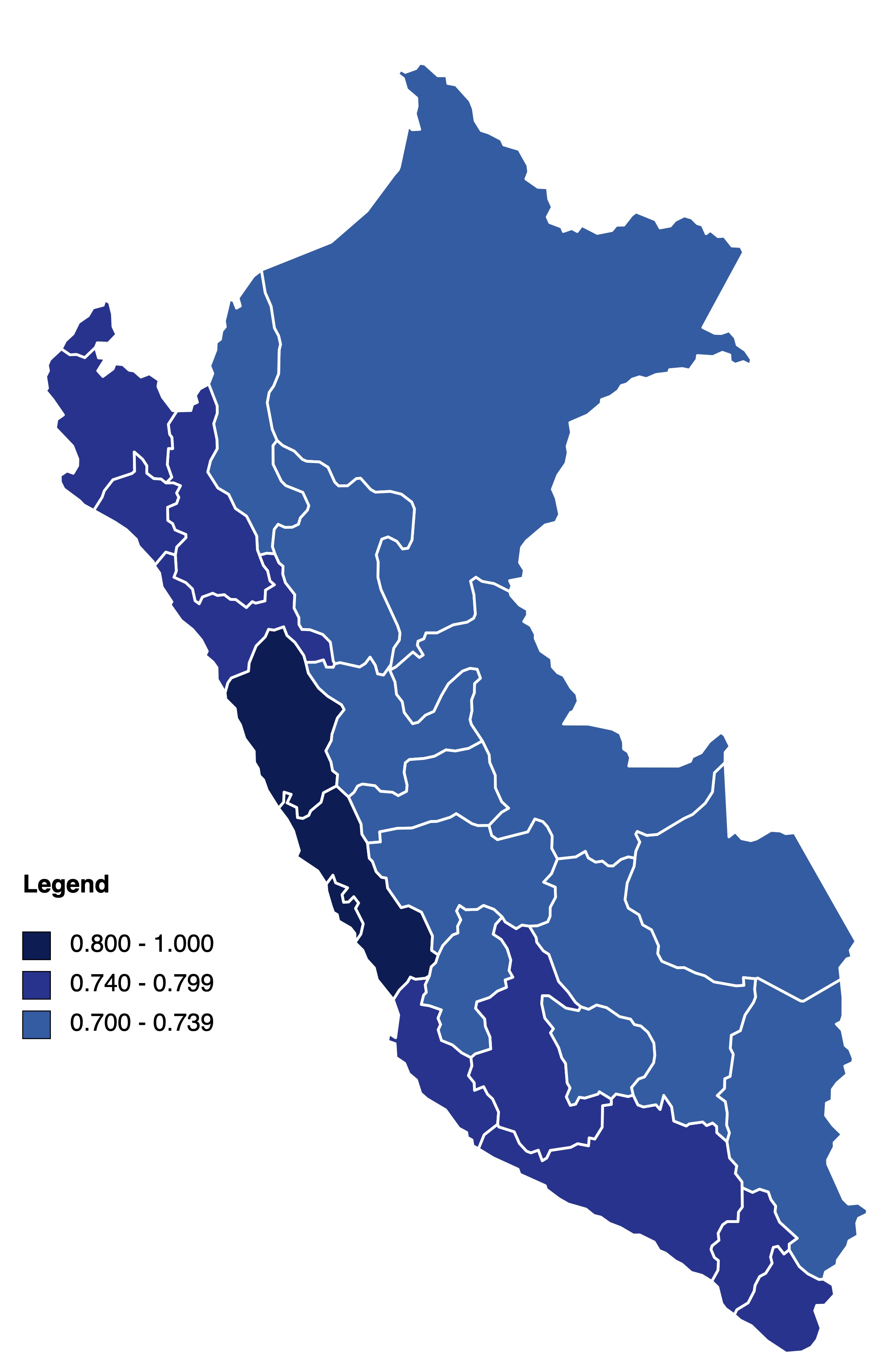
Map of the Peruvian departments by HDI in 2020. Legend: 0.800 – 1.000 0.740 – 0.799 0.700 – 0.739

This is a list of regions of Peru by Human Development Index as of 2024 with data for the year 2023.

Rank	Region (Department)	HDI (2023)
Very high human development
1	West (Ancash, Lima, Callao)	0.853
2	South (Tacna, Moquegua, Arequipa, Ica, Ayacucho)	0.815
High human development
-	Peru (average)	0.794
3	North (Tumbes, Piura, Lambayeque, Cajamarca, La Libertad)	0.762
4	Central (Huancavelica, Huanuco, Junín, Pasco)	0.749
5	North East (Amazonas, Loreto, San Martín, Ucayali)	0.734
6	East (Madre de Dios, Cusco, Puno, Apurimac)	0.733

== See also ==
- List of countries by Human Development Index
