= Department of Huaylas =

Department of Peru (1821–1823; 1835–1836)

Departamento de Huaylas
- Department of Peru
- 1821–1823
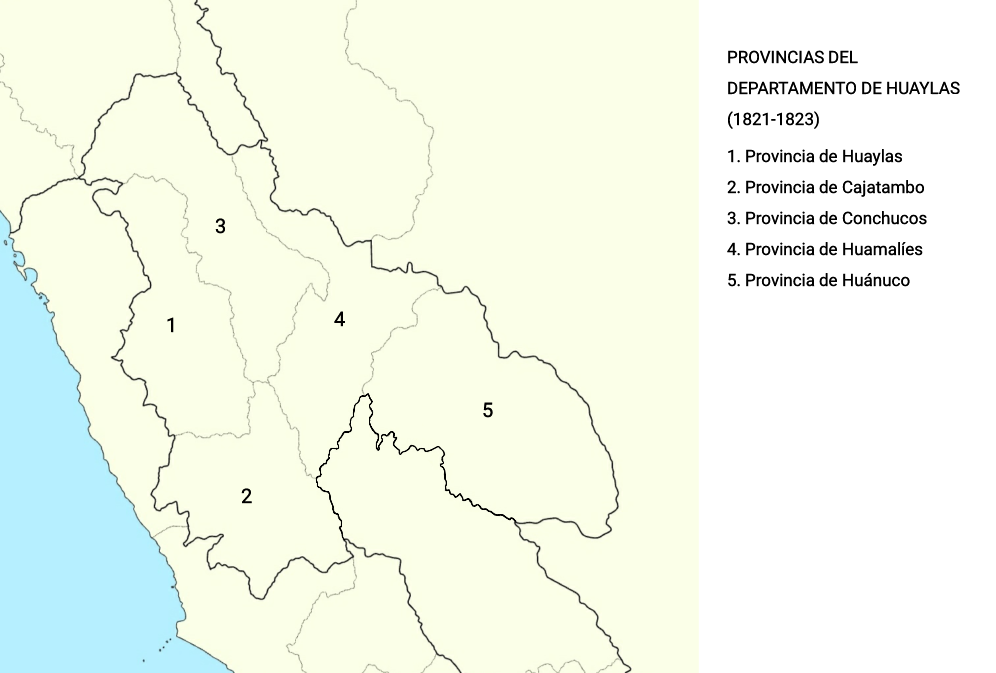
- Department of Huaylas (1821-1823)
- Capital: Huaraz
- Government
- President
  - 1821–1822: Toribio de Luzuriaga (first)
- Historical era: Independence of Peru
  - Established: 12 February 1821
  - Merged: 4 November 1823
  - Reestablished: 1835
- Subdivisions
  - Type: Provinces
  - Units: See list: Huaylas; Cajatambo; Conchucos; Huamalies; Huánuco
Preceded by	Succeeded by
Intendancy of Tarma	Department of Huánuco

The Department of Huaylas (Spanish: Departamento de Huaylas) was a short-lived department of the Protectorate of Peru that existed from 1821 to 1823, when it was annexed into the Department of Huánuco. It was later reestablished in 1835 and incorporated as a department of the Peru–Bolivian Confederation, being dissolved in 1839 along with the state.

== History ==
On February 12, 1821, by order of the so-called Reglamento Provisional in Huaura, the department was created, integrated by the provinces of Huaylas, Cajatambo, Conchucos, Huamalíes and Huánuco and with its capital in Huarás. Its first president was Toribio de Luzuriaga, with governor of Huaraz, Juan de Mata Arnao y García, ceding his office to him three months later. The political foundation of this demarcation was executed by the José de San Martín.

However, on November 4, 1823, the government of José Bernardo de Tagle decided to unite the territories of the departments of Huaylas and Tarma, giving it the name "department of Huánuco." Santa reintegrates into Lima.

On September 13, 1825, the department of Huánuco changed its name to that of Junín, by decree signed by Hipólito Unanue, Juan Salazar and José de Larrea, to honor Simón Bolívar's victory over the Spanish Army. It included the provinces of Cajatambo, Lower Conchucos (Piscobamba), Upper Conchucos (Huari), Huamalies, Huaylas, Pasco, Jauja and Tarma.

In 1835, years after its dissolution, it was again established by president Felipe Santiago Salaverry, excluding the province of Huari. After the establishment of the Peru–Bolivian Confederation, it was incorporated into the new state until its dissolution in 1839, when it became the department of Ancash.

Since 1910, local historians have advocated the return of the name Huaylas, the original name given to Ancash by San Martín.

== See also ==
- Intendancy of Tarma
- Department of Ancash
