= List of regions of Peru by population =

The following is a list of the regions of Peru ordered by population from Census 2007 and estimated population of INEI.

List of Regions of Peru by population
Rank	Image	Coat of arms	Region	Capital city	Population; Census 2007	Population estimated 2017
1	Lima		Lima	Lima	8.445.200	11.209.103
2	Piura		Piura	Piura	1.676.300	2.753.890
3	Trujillo; View of Paseo Pizarro		La Libertad	Trujillo	1.617.100	2.201.112
4	Cajamarca cathedral		Cajamarca	Cajamarca	1.455.201	2.100.090
5	Floating islands		Puno	Puno	1.268.400	1.690.783
6	Cathedral of Huancayo		Junin	Huancayo	1.225.500	1.512.111
7	Huayna Picchu overlooking Machu Picchu		Cusco	Cusco	1.171.400	1.488.112
8	Arequipa		Arequipa	Arequipa	1.152.300	1.480.009
9	Chiclayo		[[Lambayeque Region|Lambayeque	]]Chiclayo	1.112.900	1.250.349
10	Chimbote		Ancash	Huaraz	1.063.500	1.142.409
11	Iquitos main square		Loreto	Iquitos	891.700	1.028.968
12	Airport Jorge Chavez in Callao		Callao	Callao	730.871	1.010.982
13	Huánuco		Huánuco	Huánuco	762.200	854.234
14	Moyobamba		San Martín	Moyobamba	728.800	829.520
15	Ica		Ica	Ica	711.900	779.372
16	Ayacucho		Ayacucho	Ayacucho	612.500	681.149
17	Huancavelica		Huancavelica	Huancavelica	454.800	491.278
18	Pucallpa		Ucayali	Pucallpa	432.200	489.664
19	Abancay		Apurimac	Abancay	404.200	456.652
20	Chachapoyas		Amazonas	Chachapoyas	376.000	421.122
21	Tacna		Tacna	Tacna	288.800	337.583
22	Cerro de Pasco		Pasco	Cerro de Pasco	280.400	301.988
23	Tumbes cathedral		Tumbes	Tumbes	200.300	234.638
24	Moquegua		Moquegua	Moquegua	161.500	178.612
25	Puerto Maldonado		Madre de Dios	Puerto Maldonado	109.600	134.105
Sources: Censo 2007 (INEI); Estimated Population 2014

== Demographic Map ==
Demographic Map of Peru by regions

== See also ==
- List of Peruvian regions by GDP
- List of cities in Peru
- List of metropolitan areas of Peru
- Regions of Peru
