= Peruvians in Italy =

Peruvians in Italy Peruviani in Italia
Total population
- 97,128

Regions with significant populations
- Lombardy, Lazio, Piedmont

Languages
- Italian, Spanish

Religion
- Roman Catholicism

The presence of Peruvians in Italy dates back to the 1980s.

== Numbers ==
In 2019, Italy had 97.128 regular immigrants from Peru. In 2006, they were 66,506. The three cities with the highest number of Peruvians are: Milan, Rome and Turin.

== History ==
| Year | Peruvian-born population | Other data |
|---|---|---|
| 2001 | | 26,831 |
| 2006 | | 66.506 |
| 2007 | | 70.755 |
| 2008 | | 77.629 |
| 2009 | | 87.747 |
| 2011 | 246,908 | |
| 2012 | | |
| 2013 | | |

== See also ==
- Italian Peruvians
- Italy–Peru relations
- Immigration to Italy
