= Huaylas District =

Coordinates: 8°52′14″S 77°54′19″W

Huaylas Waylas
- District
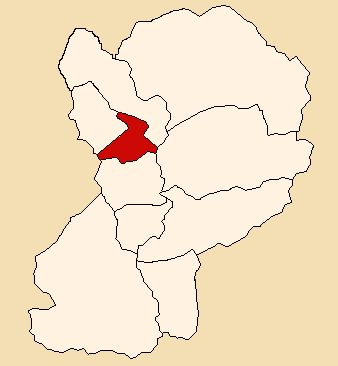
- Location of Huaylas in the Huaylas province
- Country: Peru
- Region: Ancash
- Province: Huaylas
- Capital: Huaylas
- Subdivisions: 10 populated places

Government
  - Mayor: Jose Felipe Espinoza Caballero (2007)

Area
  - Total: 56.89 km^{2} (21.97 sq mi)
- Elevation: 2,721 m (8,927 ft)

Population (2005 census)
  - Total: 1,811
  - Density: 31.83/km^{2} (82.45/sq mi)
- Time zone: UTC-5 (PET)
- UBIGEO: 021204
- Website: munihuaylas.gob.pe

The Huaylas District (Spanish: Distrito de Huaylas) is the smallest of 10 districts of the Huaylas Province in the Ancash Region of Peru. The capital of the district is the village of Huaylas.

== Location ==
The district is located in the north-western part of the province at an elevation of 2,721m. The village of Huaylas is located 45 km from the city of Caraz.

== Populated places ==
Populated places in the district with the number of households in parentheses.

- Waylas (502)
- Itakuq Punta (11)
- Waras Calle (31)
- Shuyu (199)
- Delicados (25)
- Yakup (192)
- Llima (2)
- Waruma Pukyu (12)
- Wanwamachi (4)
- Wamanyaku (30)
- Ñawinyaku (23)

== Capital ==
The capital of the district is the village of Huaylas.
