= Regions of Peru =

First-level administrative subdivisions

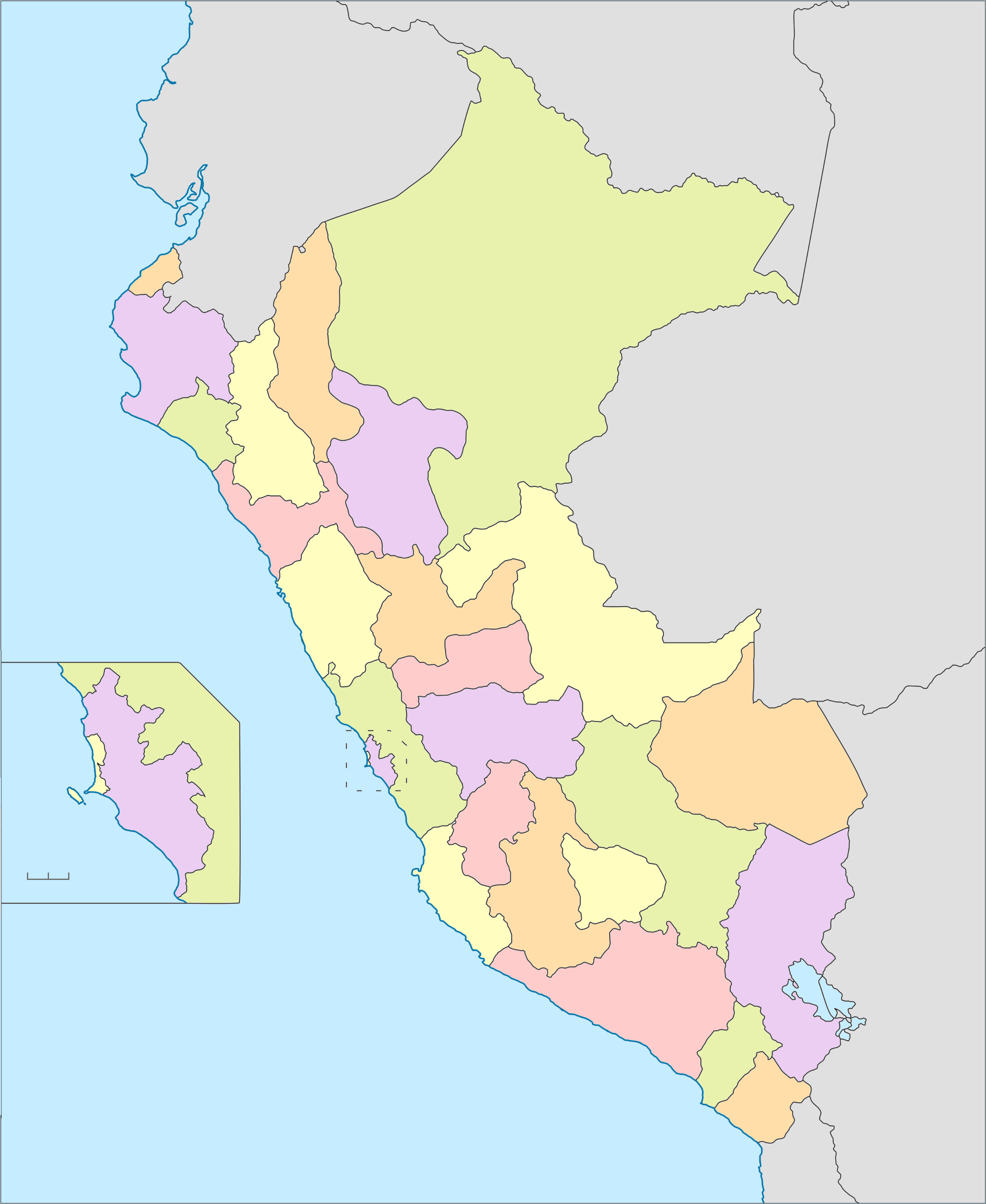
Clickable map of the departments of Peru

The departments of Peru (Spanish: departamentos), informally called regions (Spanish: regiones), are the first-level administrative subdivisions of the country. According to the Organic Law of Regional Governments, each department is administered by a regional government and a legislature responsible for administration, economic planning, and public services. These governments operate with autonomy while still coordinating with national authorities. Each department is led by a regional governor, who is elected by popular vote for a four-year term, and is responsible for implementing regional policies, managing budgets, and overseeing infrastructure projects. The governor is supported by a regional legislative council, composed of elected representatives from different provinces within the department. This council approves budgets, monitors public investments, and ensures government accountability.

There are 24 departments in total, as well as two provinces that operate under a special regime: Callao and Lima. The former does not belong to any department since 1836, but is nevertheless administered by a regional government of its own. The latter is administered by the Metropolitan Municipality of Lima, which is equal in status to a regional government.

Each department is further divided into provinces, which are governed by provincial municipalities. These municipalities are led by a mayor and a council, also elected by the population. They manage local services such as urban planning, transportation, and sanitation. Within the provinces, there are district municipalities, responsible for more localized governance, including community development, minor public works, and social programs. This three-tiered structure—regional, provincial, and district—ensures that governance reaches all levels, from large cities to rural villages.

Although the departments have autonomy, they still follow national laws and policies set by the central government. The National Decentralized Secretariat (Spanish: Secretaría de Descentralización), under the Presidency of the Council of Ministers, oversees regional governments to ensure efficiency and compliance. Departments also coordinate with national ministries for education, health, transportation, and security, receiving funding and technical support. This structure allows departments to manage their own affairs while maintaining a connection to the broader national development strategy.

== History ==
After declaring its independence in 1821, Peru was divided into departments (Spanish: departamentos), which grew in number from four in 1821 to eleven in 1822 and to twenty-four in 1980:

- Amazonas (Note: Initially established in 1832, reabsorbed into La Libertad in 1835, and restored in 1839)
- Áncash (Note: Established in 1835 as Huaylas, renamed in 1839)
- Apurímac (Note: Established in 1873)
- Arequipa (Note: Established in 1822)
- Ayacucho (Note: Established in 1822 as Huamanga, renamed in 1825)
- Cajamarca (Note: Established in 1855)
- Cuzco (Note: Established in 1822)
- Huancavelica (Note: Initially established in 1822, annexed to Huamanga (Ayacucho) in 1825, reestablished in 1839)
- Huánuco (Note: Established in 1869)
- Ica (Note: Established in 1855)
- Junín (Note: Established in 1822 as Huánuco (not to be confused with the later department) and renamed in 1825)
- La Libertad (Note: Established in 1821 as Trujillo, renamed in 1825)
- Lambayeque (Note: Established in 1874)
- Lima (Note: Established in 1821)
- Loreto (Note: Established in 1853 as the Province of Maynas, renamed to Loreto in 1861, and gained department status in 1866)
- Madre de Dios (Note: Established in 1912)
- Moquegua (Note: Initially established in 1857, demoted to province status in 1875 after Tacna department separated, regained department status in 1936)
- Pasco (Note: Established in 1944)
- Piura (Note: Established in 1837 as a province, raised to department in 1861)
- Puno (Note: Established in 1822)
- San Martin (Note: Established in 1906)
- Tacna (Note: Established in 1875)
- Tumbes (Note: Established in 1901 as a province, raised to department in 1942)
- Ucayali (Note: Established in 1980)

The departments replaced the intendancies (intendencias), the first-level administrative divisions of the Viceroyalty of Peru. According to the Reglamento Provisional of February 12, 1821, each department was headed by a departmental president (presidentes de departamentos), replacing the Viceroyalty's intendants (intendente), who performed similar functions. The title was later changed to that of prefect (prefecto), while the provinces were administered by a sub-prefect (sub-prefecto).

From 1836 to 1856, when a new constitution was passed, Peru's littoral provinces—autonomous provinces equal in status to a department—were administered by governors (gobernador), different in name only to the country's prefects, as both offices were identical.

As political and economic power increasingly concentrated in Lima, the capital city, several administrations attempted to decentralize the country with little success. The 1979 Peruvian Constitution contained provisions for the decentralization of power through the creation of autonomous regions, but they were not implemented.

=== 1989 regions ===
Map of the twelve regions

During the later years of the 1985–1990 presidency of Alan García, the government faced the prospect of losing the 1990 presidential elections because of a widespread economic crisis and faltering public support. As a way of creating an alternative source of power, the regime established twelve autonomous regions on January 20, 1989, in the hope of winning some elections at this level. However, due to the haste of their creation, these regional governments were not provided with fiscal resources of their own, so they depended on the goodwill of the central government for funding. Formation of another region was delayed by the reluctance of the Constitutional Province of Callao to merge with the Lima Department. Originally San Martín and La Libertad Regions formed the sole region of San Martín-La Libertad but later were split.

Region	Departments forming the Region
Amazonas	Loreto
Andrés Avelino Cáceres	Huánuco, (Note: Except part of Marañón Province and Leoncio Prado Province) Pasco and Junín
Arequipa	Arequipa
Chavín	Ancash (Note: Plus part of the Huánuco's provinces of Marañón and Leoncio Prado.)
Grau	Tumbes and Piura
Inca/Inka	Cuzco, Madre de Dios and Apurímac
La Libertad	La Libertad
Los Libertadores-Huari	Ica, Ayacucho and Huancavelica
José Carlos Mariátegui	Moquegua, Tacna and Puno
Nororiental del Marañón	Lambayeque, Cajamarca and Amazonas
San Martín	San Martín
Ucayali	Ucayali

=== Later history ===
The 1990 presidential elections were marked by the discrediting of political parties as evidenced in the election of Alberto Fujimori, an independent candidate. Fujimori withheld financial transfers to regional governments and then, on December 29, 1992, replaced them with government-designated Transitory Councils of Regional Administration (Spanish: Consejos Transitorios de Administración Regional). Having dissolved Congress in the 1992 Peruvian constitutional crisis, Fujimori called an election for a Constitutional Assembly which drafted the 1993 Constitution. This new text included provisions for the creation of regions with autonomous, elected governments, but they were not carried out. A framework law on decentralization (Spanish: Ley Marco de Descentralización) issued on January 30, 1998, confirmed the permanence of transitory councils, now under the supervision of the Ministry of the Presidency.

Fujimori was forced to resign in November 2000 under accusations of authoritarianism, corruption, and human rights violations. After an interim government led by Valentín Paniagua, Alejandro Toledo was elected president for the 2001–2006 period on a platform that included creating regional governments. The new administration laid out the legal framework for the new administrative subdivisions in the Decentralization Bases Law (Spanish: Ley de Bases de la Descentralización), issued on July 17, 2002, and the Organic Law of Regional Governments (Spanish: Ley Orgánica de Gobiernos Regionales) issued on November 19, 2002. New regional governments were elected on November 20, 2002, one in each of the former departments and the former Constitutional Province (Spanish: Provincia Constitucional) of Callao. The province of Lima, containing the capital, was excluded from the process; thus, it is not part of any region.

In the 2002 elections, most regional governments went to parties in opposition, with twelve going to the APRA of Alan García and only one each to Possible Peru, the party of president Alejandro Toledo and ally Independent Moralizing Front of Fernando Olivera. The combination of a strong opposition and a weak government led to concerns about an impending political crisis. However, this did not turn out to be the case as the new regional governments were absorbed by local problems and showed little initiative in national politics. As the territorial circumscriptions that regional governments inherited from the former departments are considered too small, the Decentralization Bases Law provides for mergers between departments after a majority of the populations involved express their approval up to become a formal region. The first referendum of this kind was carried out on October 30, 2005, with the following proposals being put to the ballot:

- Apurímac, Cuzco
- Arequipa, Puno, Tacna
- Ayacucho, Huancavelica, Ica
- Ancash, Huánuco, Junín, Lima, Pasco
- Lambayeque, Piura, Tumbes

These proposals were rejected by the electorate of all departments involved except for Arequipa. Thus, no merger was carried out.

New elections for regional governments were held on November 19, 2006; most regions went to local political movements rather than to national parties. The APRA, which had won the presidential elections held on June 4, 2006, only won in two regions, all other national parties achieved even less.

== Government ==
According to the Organic Law of Regional Governments, the responsibilities of regional governments include planning regional development, executing public investment projects, promoting economic activities, and managing public property. Regional governments are composed of a president and a council, elected for a four-year term; additionally, there is a coordination council integrated by provincial mayors and representatives of the civil society. The Regional President is the head of government; his functions include proposing and enforcing the budget, appointing government officials, issuing decrees and resolutions, executing regional plans and programs, and administering regional properties and rents. The Regional Council debates and votes upon bills proposed by the regional president, it also oversees all regional officials and can remove the president, its vice president, and any council member from office. The Regional Coordination Council has a consultancy role in planning and budget issues, and it has no executive or legislative powers.

The Organic Law of Regional Governments stipulates the gradual transfer of functions from the central government to the regions, provided they are certified as capable of undertaking these tasks. To oversee this process, the Decentralization Bases Law created a National Council of Decentralization (Spanish: Consejo Nacional de Descentralización). However, this institution was criticized for being bureaucratic and ineffective by the government of Alan García, former president of Peru. Thus, on January 24, 2007, the council was abolished and replaced by the Decentralization Secretariat (Spanish: Secretaría de Descentralización), a dependency of the Prime Minister office. Two months later, the regional presidents gathered in the city of Huánuco established a National Assembly of Regional Governments (Spanish: Asamblea Nacional de Gobiernos Regionales) as an alternative coordinating institution, independent from the Central Government.

== Regions ==
Area and population information on the following list has been retrieved from official data by the Peruvian National Institute of Statistics and Informatics (Spanish: Instituto Nacional de Estadística e Informática, INEI). Areas are rounded to the nearest whole unit. Demographic data is based on the 2025 Census. Population density is given to one decimal place in persons per square kilometer. UBIGEO numbers are codes used by INEI to identify national administrative subdivisions.

Region	Flag	ISO	UBIGEO	Capital	Area (km^{2})	Population (2025)	Population density (/km^{2})	Location
Amazonas		PE-AMA	01	Chachapoyas	39,249	467,845	11.9	
Ancash		PE-ANC	02	Huaraz	35,914	1,205,998	33.7	
Apurímac		PE-APU	03	Abancay	20,896	467,380	22.4	
Arequipa		PE-ARE	04	Arequipa	63,345	1,814,396	28.6	
Ayacucho		PE-AYA	05	Ayacucho	43,815	709,570	16.2	
Cajamarca		PE-CAJ	06	Cajamarca	33,318	1,490,769	44.8	
Callao (Note: Callao is a Constitutional Province, which operates under an autonomous regime separate from every other department. It is nevertheless administered by a regional government.)		PE-CAL	07	Callao	147	1,101,911	7,496	
Cusco		PE-CUS	08	Cusco	71,986	1,379,003	19.2	
Huancavelica		PE-HUV	09	Huancavelica	22,131	371,909	16.8	
Huánuco		PE-HUC	10	Huánuco	36,849	807,612	21.9	
Ica		PE-ICA	11	Ica	21,328	1,033,185	48.4	
Junín		PE-JUN	12	Huancayo	37,667	1,422,597	32.0	
La Libertad		PE-LAL	13	Trujillo	25,500	2,056,560	80.4	
Lambayeque		PE-LAM	14	Chiclayo	14,231	1,404,376	98.7	
Lima		PE-LIM	15	Lima (Note: Huacho is the seat of the department's regional government.)	34,802	1,018,876	31.7	
Loreto		PE-LOR	16	Iquitos	368,852	1,032,016	2.8	
Madre de Dios		PE-MDD	17	Puerto; Maldonado	85,301	208,682	2.5	
Moquegua		PE-MOQ	18	Moquegua	15,734	194,842	12.4	
Pasco		PE-PAS	19	Cerro de Pasco	25,320	253,223	10.0	
Piura		PE-PIU	20	Piura	35,892	2,115,587	58.9	
Puno		PE-PUN	21	Puno	66,997	1,232,995	17.1	
San Martín		PE-SAM	22	Moyobamba	51,253	968,472	18.9	
Tacna		PE-TAC	23	Tacna	16,076	389,302	24.2	
Tumbes		PE-TUM	24	Tumbes	4,046	256,683	55.0	
Ucayali		PE-UCA	25	Pucallpa	101,831	624,235	6.1	

=== Former departments ===
Department	Capital city	Established	Disestablished	Fate
Costa	Huaura	1821	1823	Incorporated into Lima
Huánuco	Tarma	1823	1825	Reorganised into Junín
Huaylas	Tarma	1821	1823	Incorporated into Huánuco
Littoral	Tacna	1837	1857	Reorganised into Moquegua
Quijos & Maynas	Moyobamba	1822	1825	Incorporated into Trujillo
Tarapacá	Iquique	1878	1883	Incorporated into Chile
Tarma	Tarma	1821	1823	Incorporated into Huánuco
Trujillo	Trujillo	1821	1825	Reorganised as La Libertad

== See also ==
- Administrative divisions of Peru
- Districts of Peru
- ISO 3166-2:PE
- Provinces of Peru
- List of regions of Peru by population
- List of Peruvian regions by GDP
- List of regions of Peru by Human Development Index
