= Reglamento Provisional =

First legal document of Peru

The Provisional Regulations (Spanish: Reglamento Provisional) are the name given to an official document issued on February 12, 1821, by José de San Martín as Protector of Peru, considered the first legal document of the newly born state. The 20-article long document replaced the system of government established by the Spanish Empire, and applied to the territories occupied by the Liberating Army, which at the time were the province of Chancay—where San Martín's headquarters were set up in Huaura—and the intendancies of Tarma (location of Pasco mine) and Trujillo. These territories were organised in four departments, each headed by a president: Trujillo, Coast, Huaylas and Tarma.

It was effective until the Provisional Statute (Spanish: Estatuto Provisional) was promulgated on October 8, 1821.

== See also ==
- Constitution of Peru
