= Tarma =

- City
- Santa Ana de la Ribera de Tarma
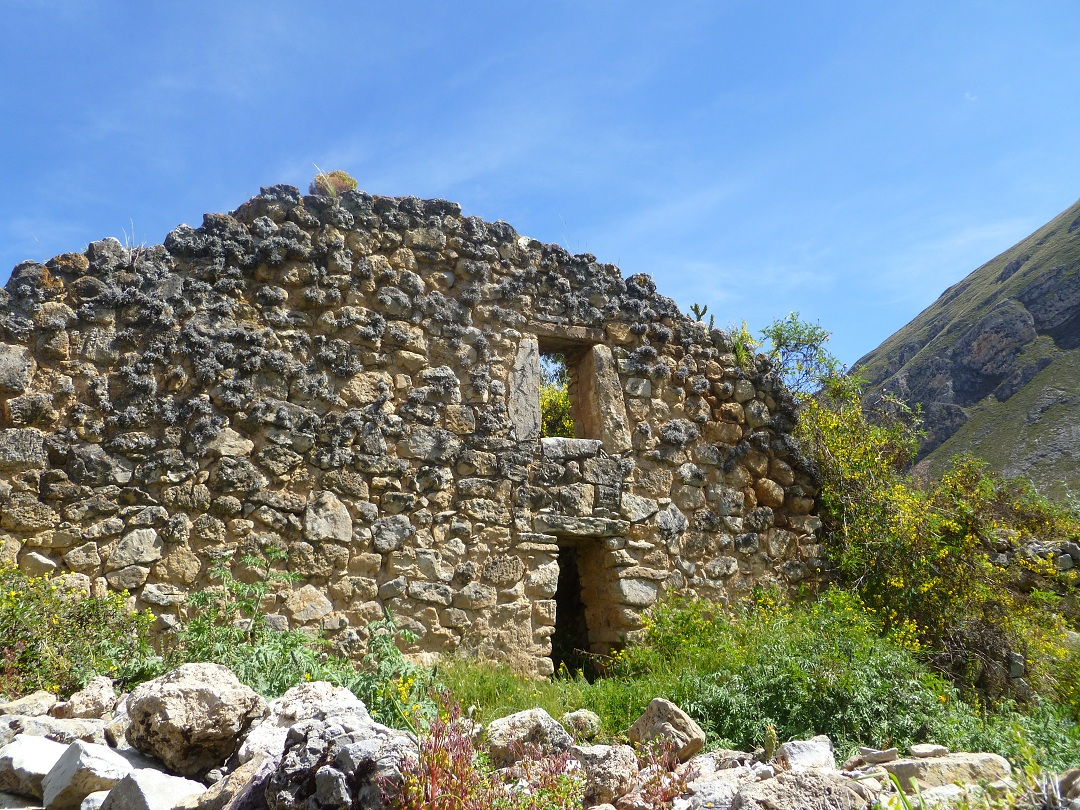
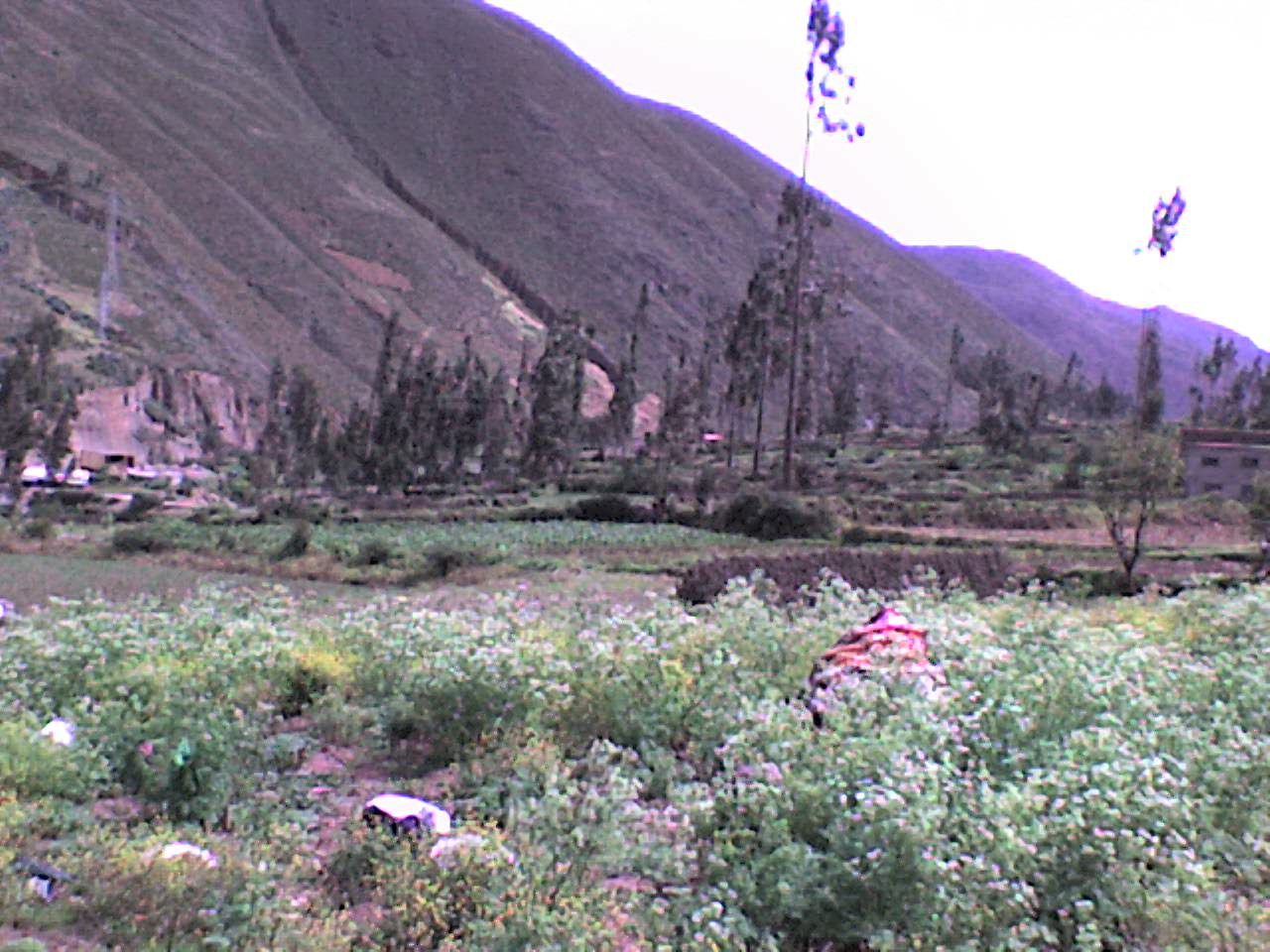
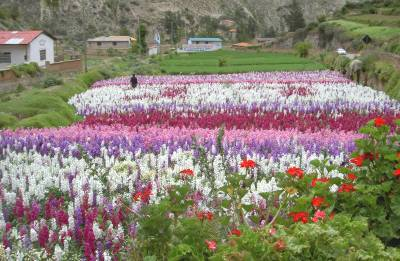
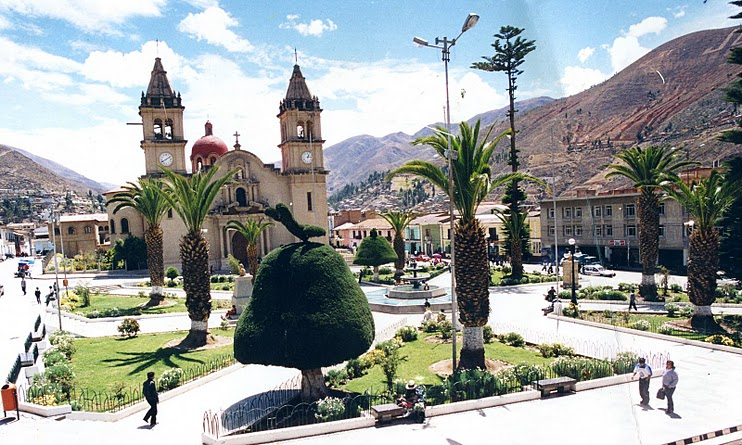
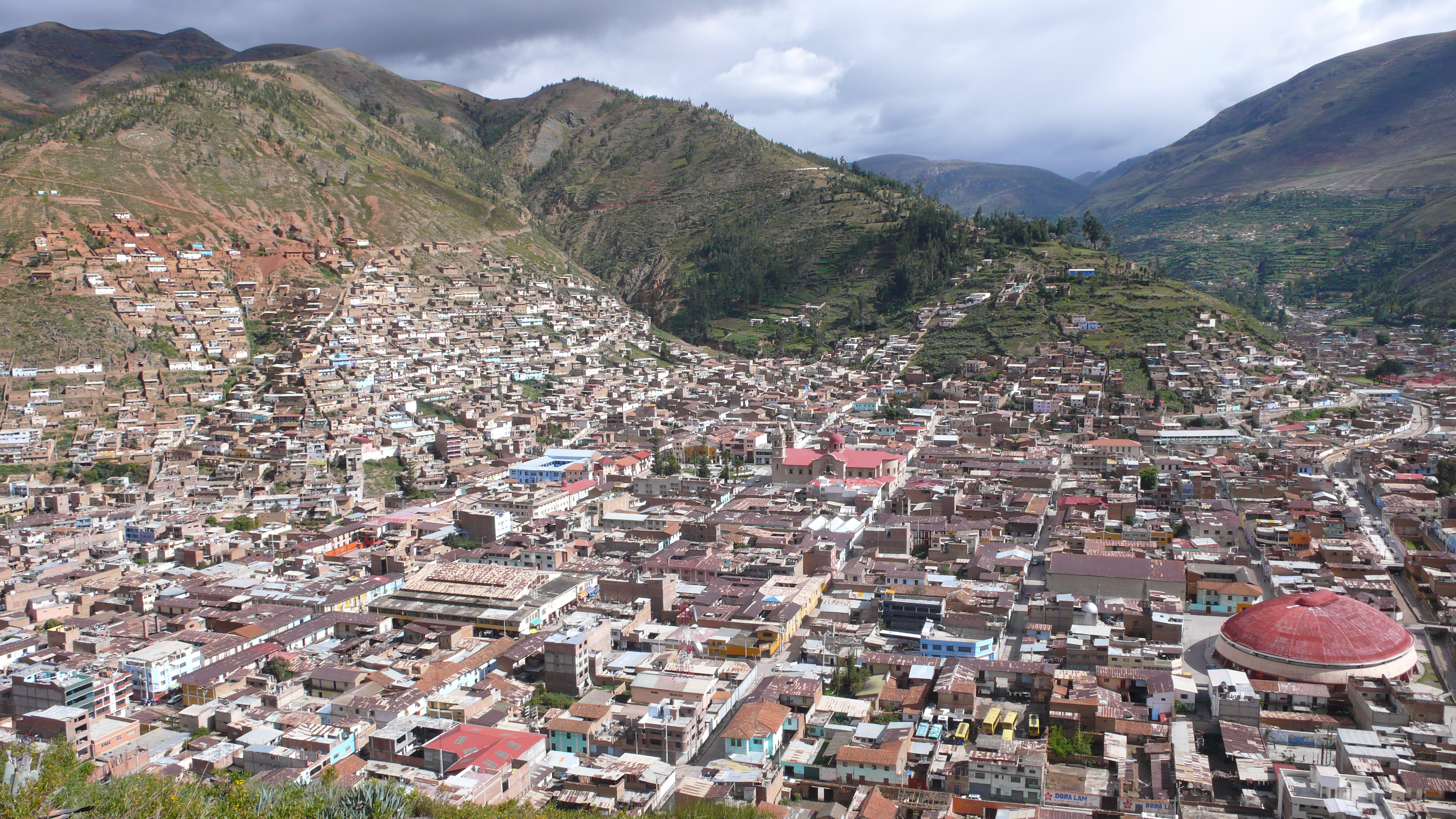

- Flag Coat of arms
- Nickname: The pearl of the Andes (Spanish: La perla de los Andes)
- Location within Peru
- Coordinates: 11.418611°S 75.690833°W
- Country: Peru
- Region: Junín
- Province: Tarma
- District: Tarma
- Established: 25 June 1875

Government
  - Mayor: Fathy Jiménez (2023-2026)

Area
  - Total: 226.9 km^{2} (87.6 sq mi)
- Elevation: 3,053 m (10,016 ft)

Population (2017)
  - Total: 43,042
  - Density: 189.7/km^{2} (491.3/sq mi)
- Demonym: Tarmeño/a
- Time zone: UTC−5 (PET)

Santa Ana de la Ribera de Tarma, known as Tarma, is the capital city of Tarma Province in Junín Region, Peru. The city has a population of 43,042 as of the 2017 census.

== History ==
=== Pre-Hispanic era ===
Recent archaeological excavations show that prior to Inca occupation, the gorges of Tarma were settled by many ethnic groups. The Chinchaycocha were to the northwest, mainly what is today La Oroya and northern part of the valley. The xauxa settled to the southern part, south of Tarma river. A small group called Palcamayo settled to the east section. When the Inca arrived, they built up a new province in Tarma. They took away people and territory from the former ethnic groups and building a strategic political province, which allowed them to better control the large ethnic groups of Chinchaycocha, Xauxa and Wanka. Tarma became a sort of buffer zone for the Inca. The capital of the Inca province was Tarmatambo.

Tarma was founded during the policy of "reducciones" under the rule of fifth viceroy Francisco de Toledo (1569-1575). The Spaniards moved the capital or head of the province from Tarmatambo, located at a slope of a mountain, to the bottom of the valley, called Pampas. Originally its name was Santa Ana de Pampas, and was a town of natural people, called "pueblo de indios".

=== Viceroyalty of Peru ===
With the introduction of the Intendencias in 1784, the first Intendente Don Juan Maria Gálvez, converted or elevated the status of the village to that of a "villa" or town. This meant that the Cabildo or city administration was no longer in the hand of the local indians, but turned to the Spaniards and wealthy mestizos. Thus, was also the name of the town change to Tarma. Indeed, throughout the Colonial time, since the 17th century, the name of Tarma was becoming popular in used than the one of Pampas. In 1815 the first cadastre was made in Tarma, concluding that the town had 775 houses and approximately 3500 inhabitants.

=== Republican period ===
In the beginning of November, 1820, during the war of independence that took ahead general Don Jose of San Martín, the population of the city of Tarma supported the General Arenales. On 25 November, General Arenales reached Tarma, being welcomed with celebrations in the city.

On 31 December 1855, Tarma officially became a province.

During the War of the Pacific, Tarma supported the Peruvian army, and later supported the resistance commanded by Marshal Andrés Avelino Cáceres.

Tarma was the birthplace of Gen. Manuel A. Odría, President of Peru between 1948 and 1956, who during his presidential term undertook important infrastructure constructions in the city, all of them in operation until today.

On 21 June 1989, tragedy struck the town when a Peruvian Air Force DHC-5D Buffalo transport plane crashed into a mountain 30 km northwest of Tarma, killing all five crew and 57 passengers in the deadliest accident involving this type of aircraft. The aircraft was heavily overloaded with tropical timber, animals and civil passengers (out of a maximum capacity for 44 passengers) as it was operating a civic flight servicing inhabitants of remote and difficult-to-access locations. It had departed Pucallpa on a flight to Lima with an en route stop at San Ramón Airstrip when, ten minutes after taking off, the pilot reported problems maintaining altitude, as the plane could not obtain full engine power due to the overload factor.

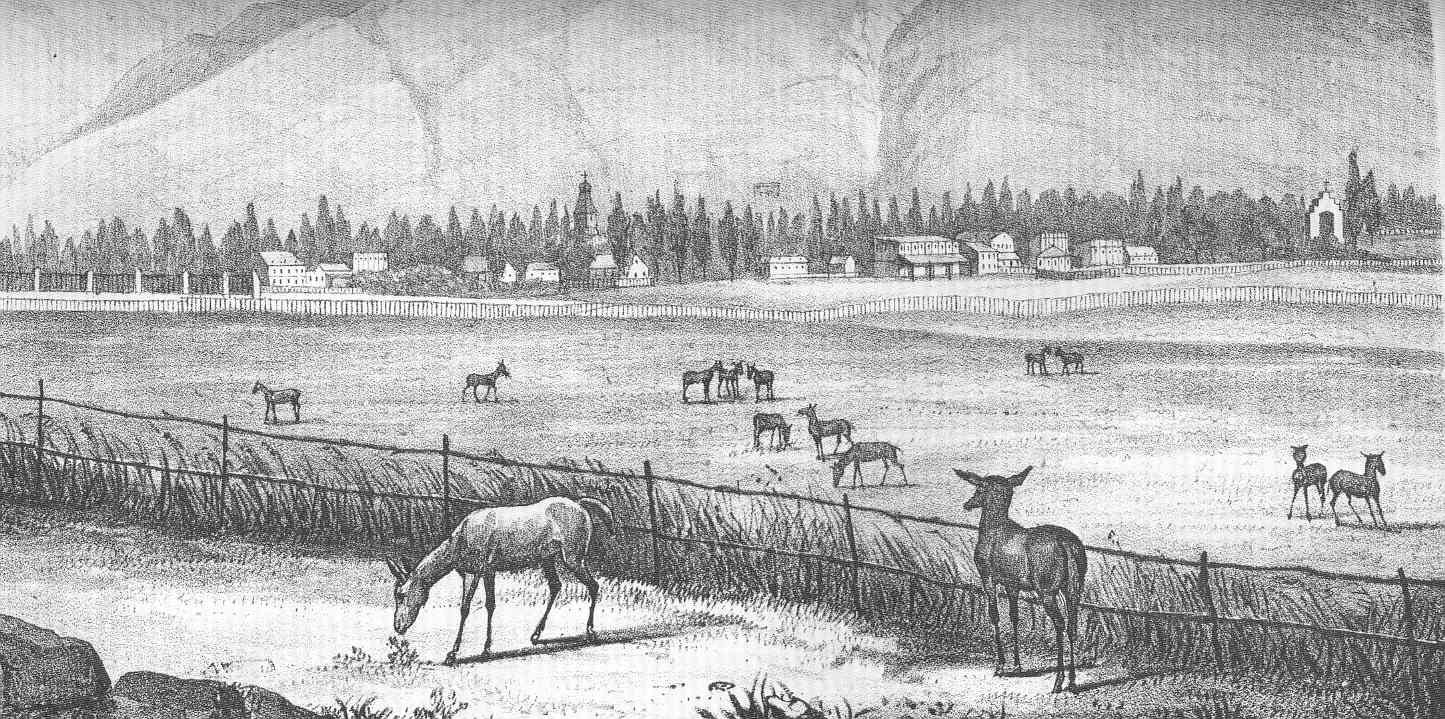
Drawing of Tarma in 1854

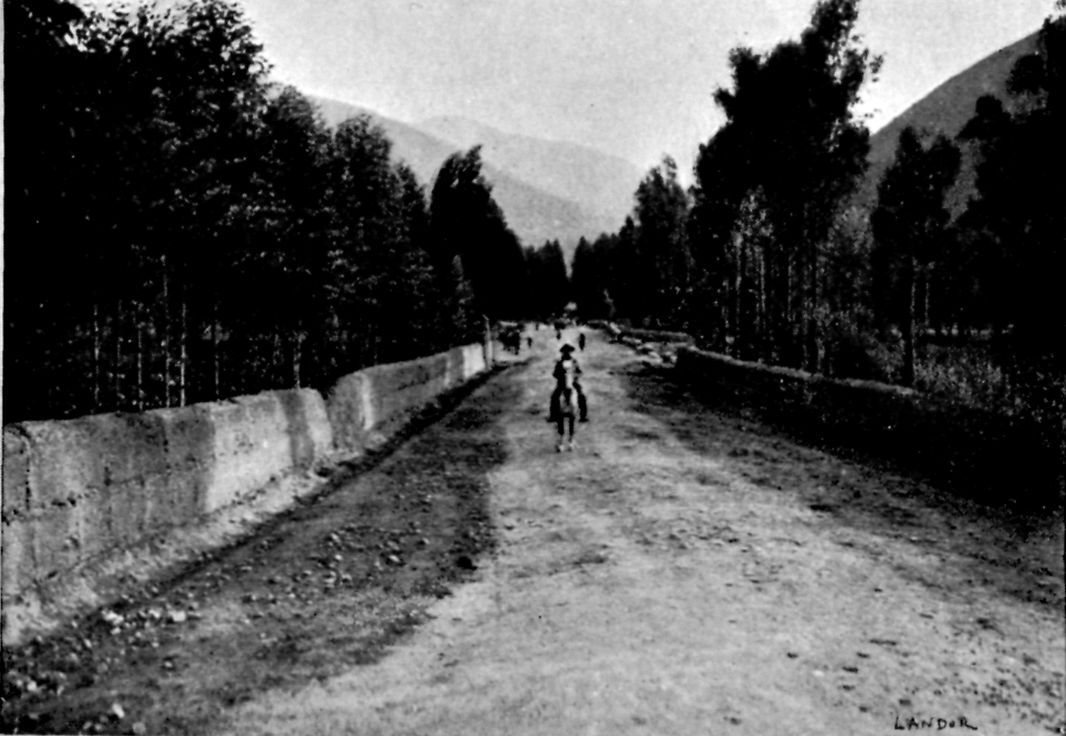
Tarma in 1913

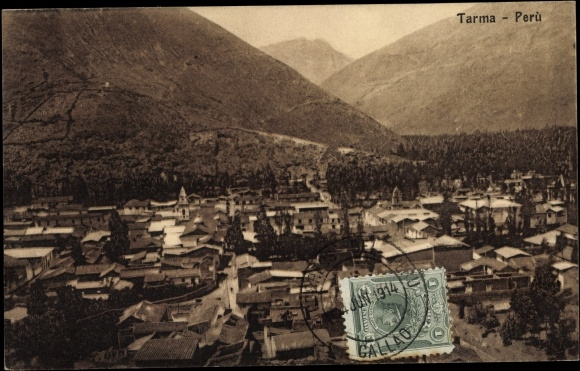
Tarma in 1914

== Geography ==
The city of Tarma is located in the center of the Tarma Province; 232 kilometers east of the city of Lima, in the mountain ranges of the Andes. Its location is the point of nexus between the central coast (departments of Lima and Ica), the Andean provinces of the department of Junín and the Central Forest (provinces of Chanchamayo and Satipo). The city is situated within a fertile valley, where many important civilizations lived in the past, from pre-Inca cultures to the Inca Culture. Evidence can be found through archaeological remains.

== Climate ==
Climate data for Tarma, elevation 3,025 m (9,925 ft), (1991–2020)
Month	Jan	Feb	Mar	Apr	May	Jun	Jul	Aug	Sep	Oct	Nov	Dec	Year
Mean daily maximum °C (°F)	20.3 (68.5)	20.1 (68.2)	20.4 (68.7)	21.0 (69.8)	21.3 (70.3)	20.9 (69.6)	20.5 (68.9)	20.5 (68.9)	20.7 (69.3)	20.8 (69.4)	21.2 (70.2)	20.5 (68.9)	20.7 (69.2)
Mean daily minimum °C (°F)	6.9 (44.4)	6.9 (44.4)	6.9 (44.4)	6.3 (43.3)	5.1 (41.2)	3.8 (38.8)	3.5 (38.3)	4.1 (39.4)	5.7 (42.3)	6.5 (43.7)	6.6 (43.9)	6.9 (44.4)	5.8 (42.4)
Average precipitation mm (inches)	55.3 (2.18)	62.8 (2.47)	59.9 (2.36)	28.5 (1.12)	11.0 (0.43)	4.7 (0.19)	5.9 (0.23)	6.3 (0.25)	12.7 (0.50)	32.1 (1.26)	29.4 (1.16)	55.4 (2.18)	364 (14.33)
Source: National Meteorology and Hydrology Service of Peru

== Economy ==
The most important economic activities belong to the service sector (commerce, tourism) and the public sector (public administration, health, and education). The secondary sector is less dominant. Cement production stands out for the UNACEM factory, which on the one hand is one of the most important in Peru and generates a great economic and banking movement; on the other hand it causes environmental pollution. Trade depends on local agricultural products, especially floriculture and herbiculture. Besides, there is horticulture and fruit growing in the surrounding districts.

== Notable people ==
- José Gálvez Moreno, Peruvian war hero of the War of the Pacific.

== Bibliography ==
- Arellano Hoffmann, C. Notas sobre el indígena en la Intendencia de Tarma. Una evaluación de la visita de 1786. Bonn 1984. ISBN 3-931419-45-2
- Arellano Hoffmann, C. Apuntes históricos sobre la Provincia de Tarma en la sierra central del Perú. El kuraka y los ayllus bajo la dominación colonial española, siglos XVI-XVIII. Bonn 1984. ISBN 3-931419-47-9
- Parsons, J., C. Hastings & R. Matos Mendieta Prehispanic settlement patterns in the upper Mantaro and Tarma drainages, Junín, Peru: The Tarma-Chinchaycocha region. Michigan 2000. ISBN 978-0-915703-49-4
- Lecaros Terry, A. Los peregrinos del Señor de Muruhuay. Espacio, culto e identidad en los Andes. Tesis de Doctorado. Berlín 2001. ZIP
