= Iglesia de la Recoleta (Lima) =

Church in Peru

Coordinates: 12°03′13″S 77°02′17″W

Church of the Sacred Hearts of Jesus and Mary
- Iglesia de los Sagrados Corazones de Jesús y María
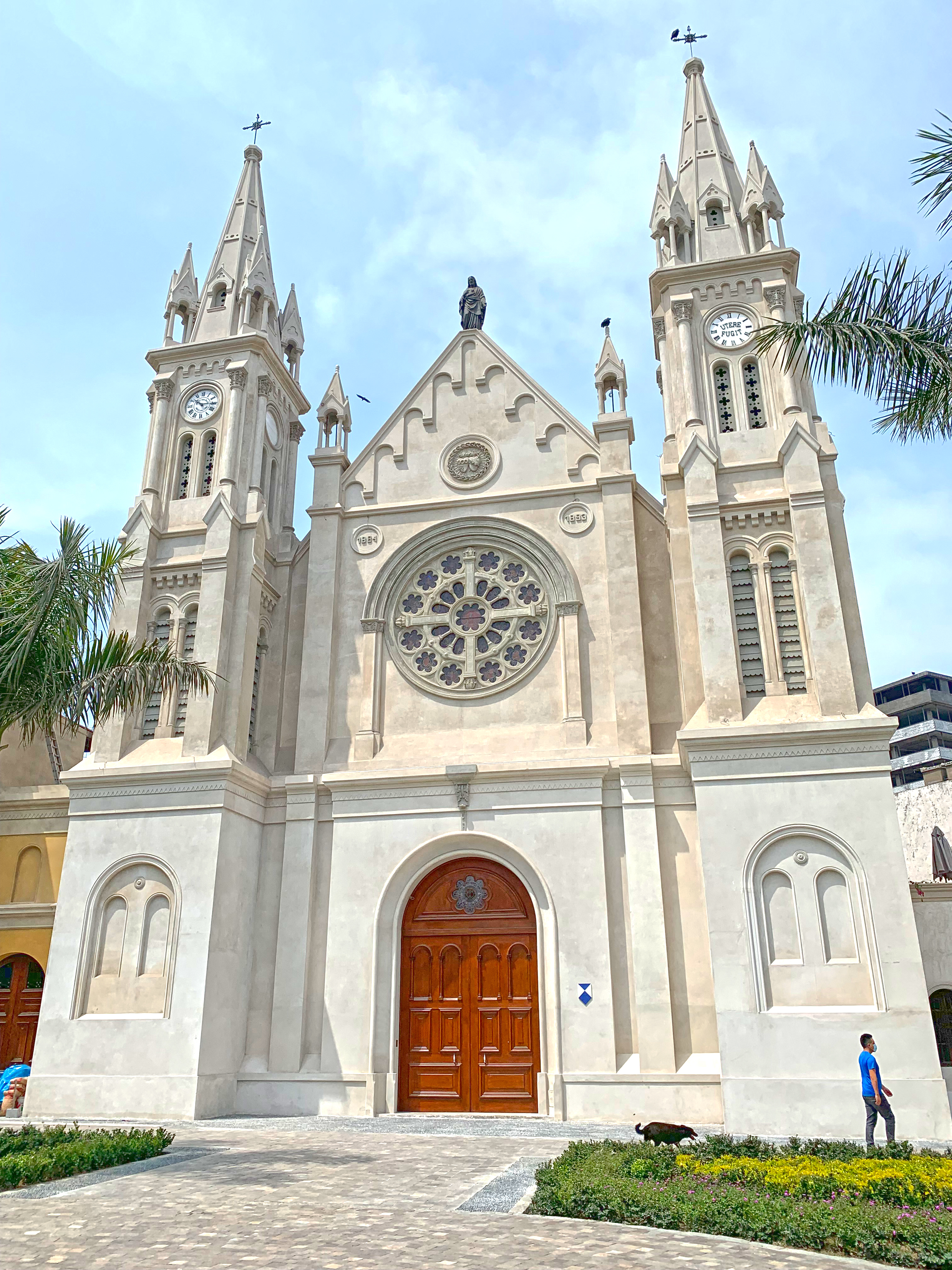

Religion
- Affiliation: Catholicism

Location
- Location: Plaza Francia, Lima; Garcilaso de la Vega 1131
- Interactive map of Church of the Sacred Hearts of Jesus and Mary

Architecture
- Style: Gothic Revival
- Completed: 1606

The Church of the Sacred Hearts of Jesus and Mary (Spanish: Iglesia de los Sagrados Corazones de Jesús y María), also known as the Iglesia de la Recoleta, is a Catholic church in the Plaza Francia in the historic centre of Lima, Peru. It was declared Cultural heritage of Peru in 2001.

== History ==
The recoleta de la Magdalena is one of the oldest in Lima since it was built in 1606. Its founder and promoter was Brother Juan de Lorenzana who managed to obtain the license from Viceroy Gaspar de Zúñiga and Archbishop Turibius of Mogrovejo. The dedication was adopted on June 23, 1606, with the name of Saint Mary Magdalene.

Several areas of the church collapsed in the earthquakes of 1687 and 1746 and it was rebuilt after a fire in 1868.

== Architecture ==
The irregular small square attached to the atrium of the church stands out, which is juxtaposed with a pre-existing Inca path. Not only the layout of the floor remains from the baroque construction. After a neoclassical reconstruction, the current façade is in the neo-Gothic style.

The Gothic-Elizabethan floor plan has a long and narrow rectangular shape. In this one, the six chapels-niches on the side walls stand out. The front wall has been left octagonal due to the chamfered corners.

The main chapel and the nave are separated by a dividing main arch.

== Gallery ==
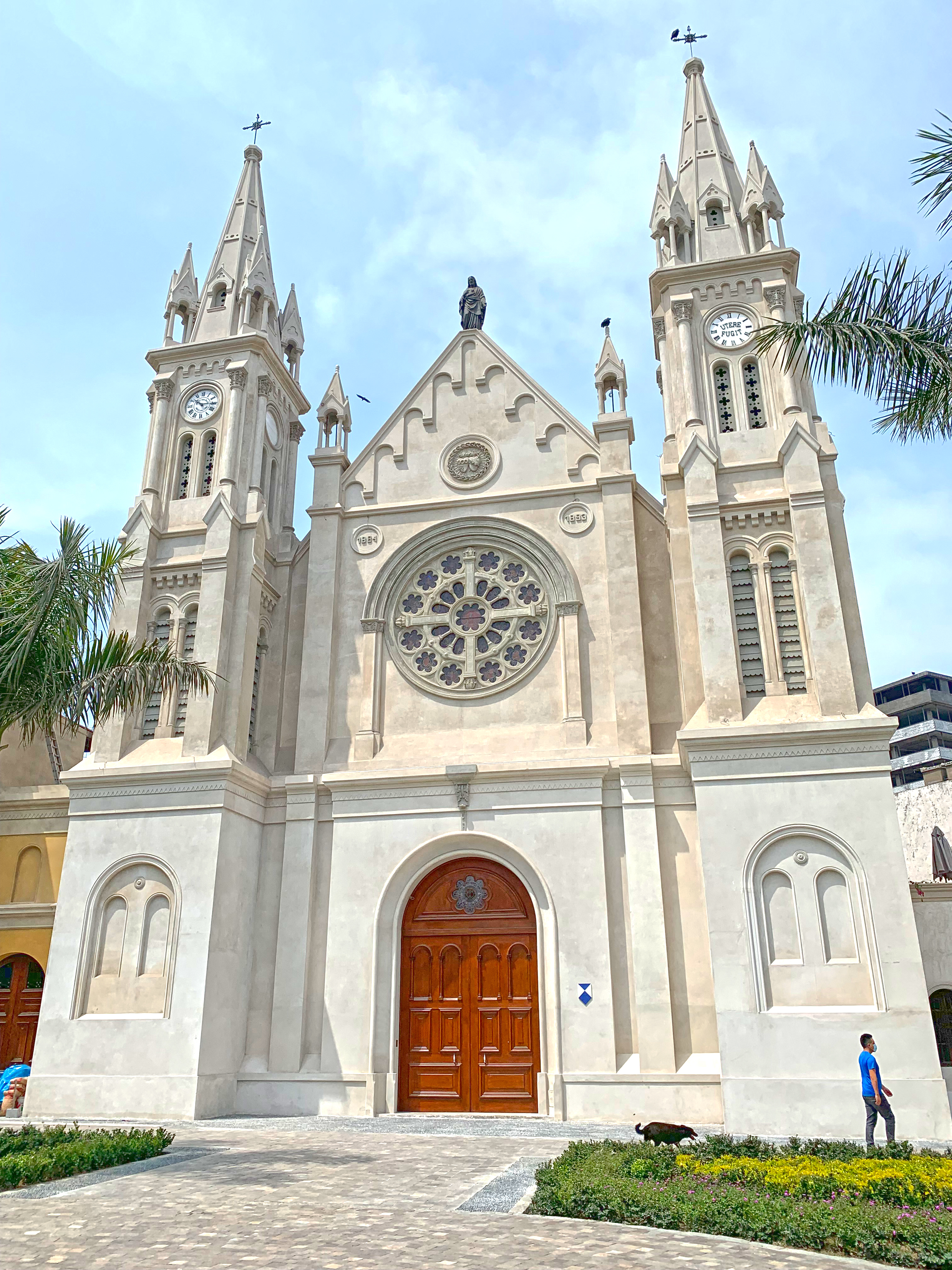
The church in 2021

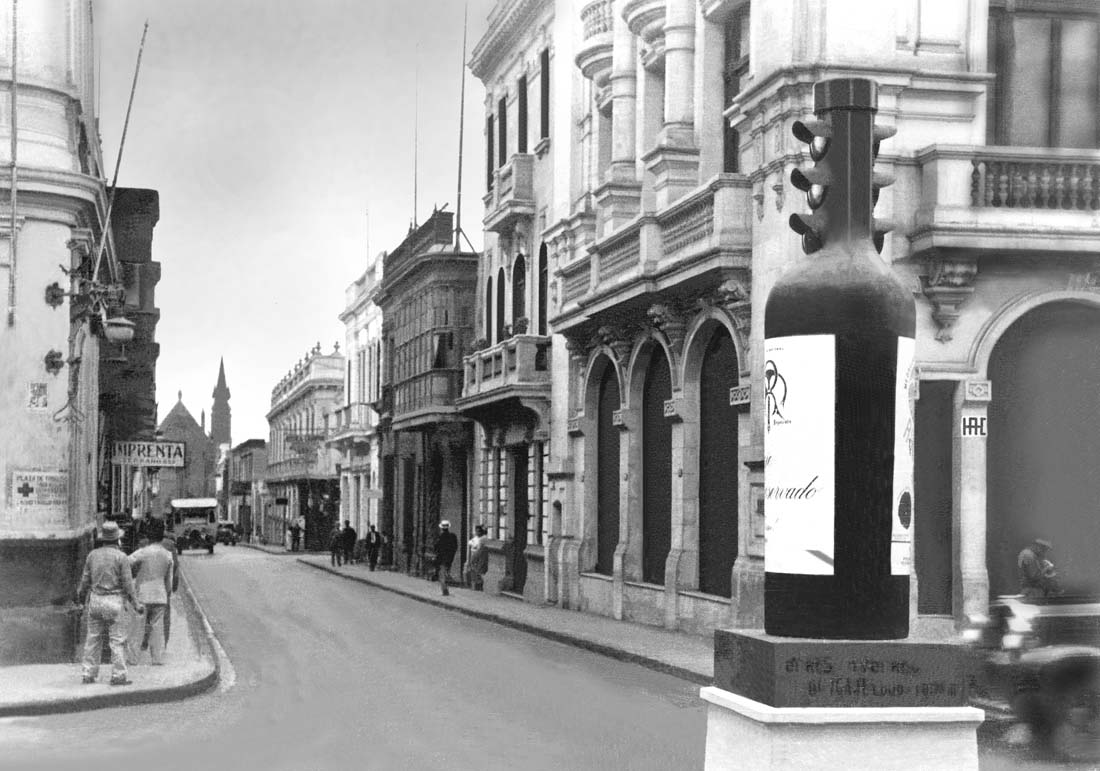
Historical photo from Jr. Camaná, the church can be seen at the end of the street

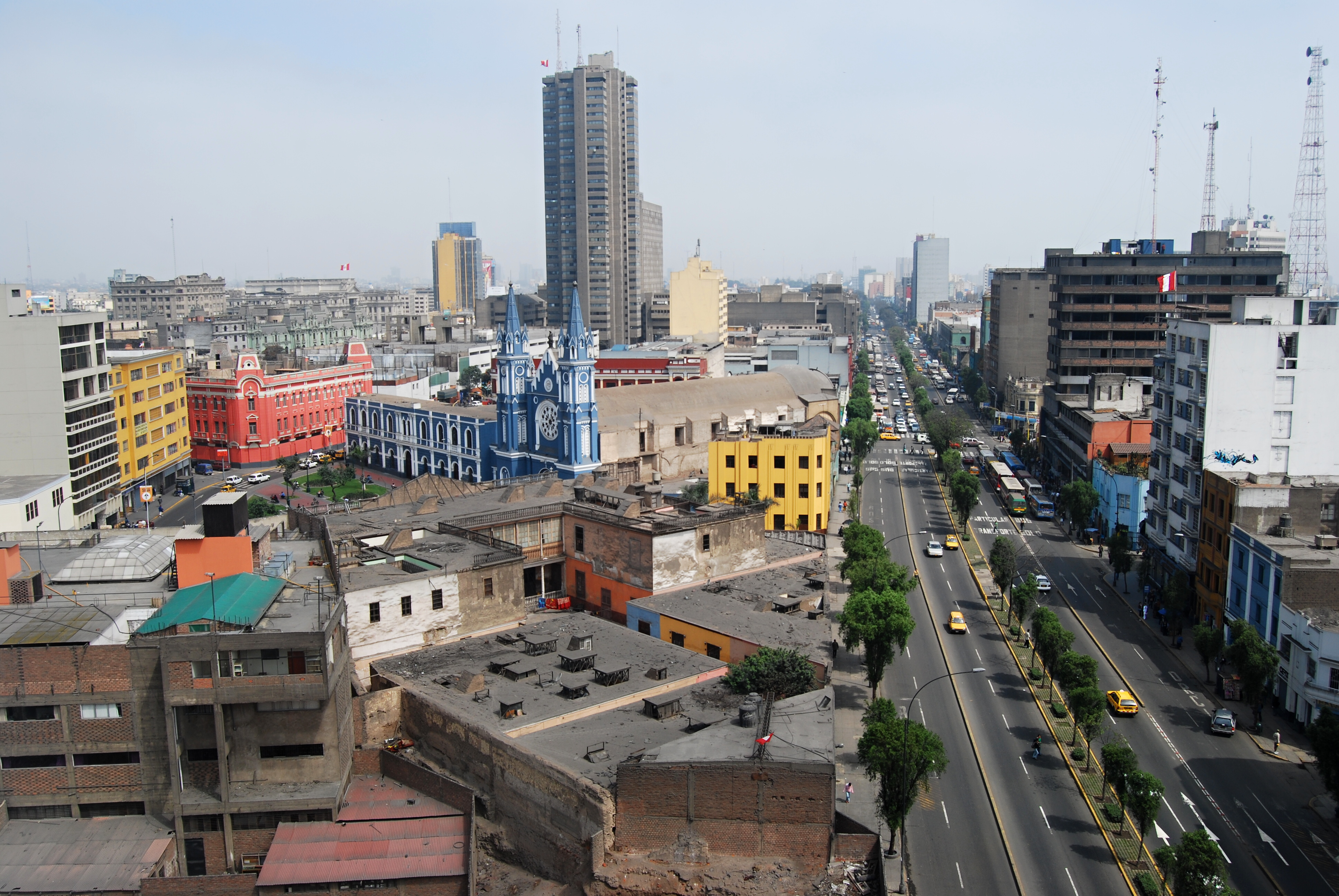
Aerial view: the church, former French embassy (left), Wilson Avenue (right), Justice Palace, Sheraton Hotel and Civic Centre (background) can all be seen

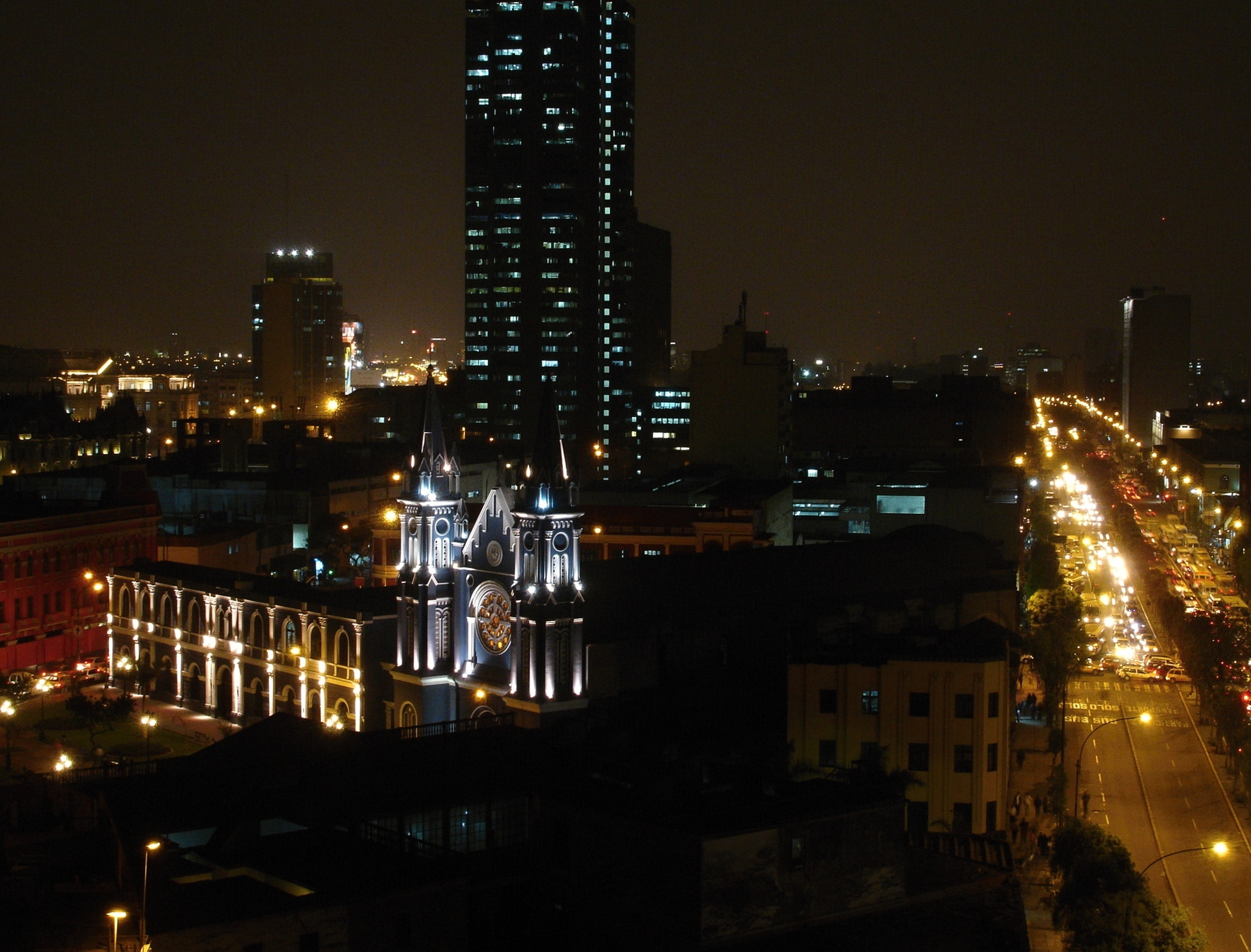
Ditto, seen at night

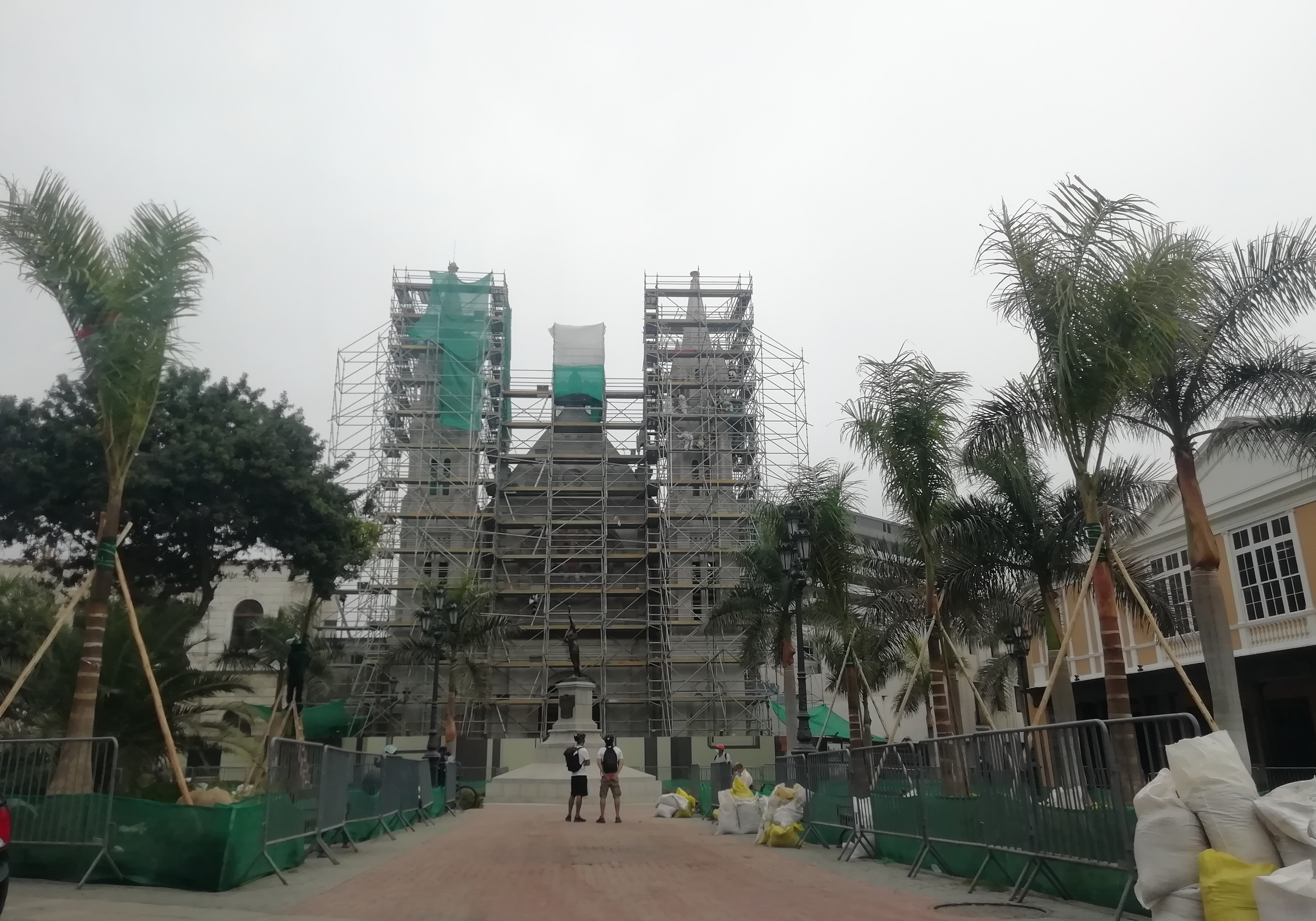
The church undergoing renovations in 2021

== See also ==
- Historic centre of Lima
- Statue of Liberty (Peru), located next to the church
- Pinacotheca of Lima
