= Avenida España (Lima) =

Avenue in Lima, Peru

Spain Avenue
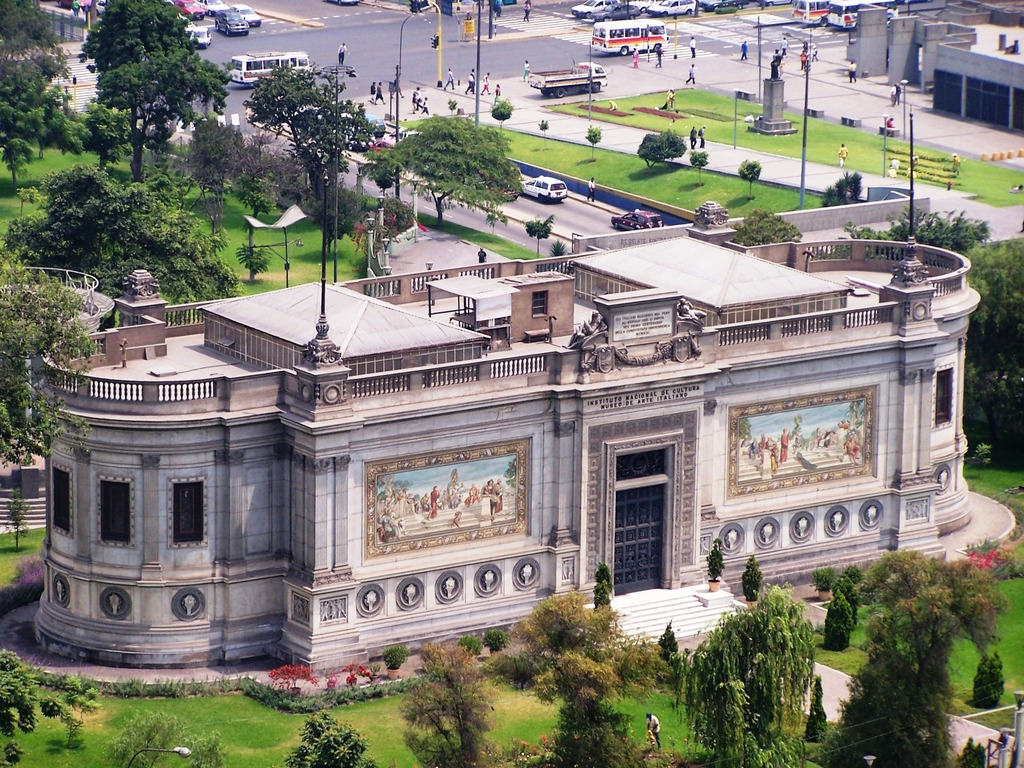
- The avenue, behind the Museum of Italian Art
- Namesake: Spain; Park of the Exhibition (former)
- From: Paseo de la República
- Major junctions: Wilson Avenue, Alfonso Ugarte Avenue
- To: Jirón Varela

Spain Avenue (Spanish: Avenida España), formerly known as the Avenue of the Exhibition (Spanish: Avenida de la Exposición) and then as Alfonso XIII Avenue (Spanish: Avenida Alfonso XIII) until 1931, is an avenue in Lima, Peru. It extends from east to west in the districts of Lima and Breña along 7 blocks. The tracks of the Metropolitano extend along its route between Paseo de la República and Alfonso Ugarte Avenue.

== History ==
The avenue's inception began in the early 20th century, as the city of Lima expanded westward. The avenue's 3rd block begins at the site of the former Lima Penitentiary, today the Lima Civic Center.

From the late 1940s to the early 1990s, the avenue's intersection with Garcilaso de la Vega was the location of the former U.S. Embassy until its move to Monterrico due to being targeted by the terrorist group Shining Path on several occasions, as well as by the MRTA, who bombed the embassy on February 14, 1990.

== Route ==
It starts at its intersection with the Plaza Grau and the Paseo de la República with a circulating direction from east to west. Between Paseo de la República and Avenida Garcilaso de la Vega, the avenue passes under a bridge, near the Civic Center. The 4th block of the avenue houses the art deco-style building of the Provincial Sub-Prefecture of Lima.

The intersection with Garcilaso de la Vega is the location of the Clínica Internacional since the 1990s and of the Casa Matusita, popularly known as a haunted house.
