= Colegio Sagrados Corazones Belén =

School in Lima, Peru

Coordinates: 12°06′16″S 77°02′49″W

College of the Sacred Hearts of Belén
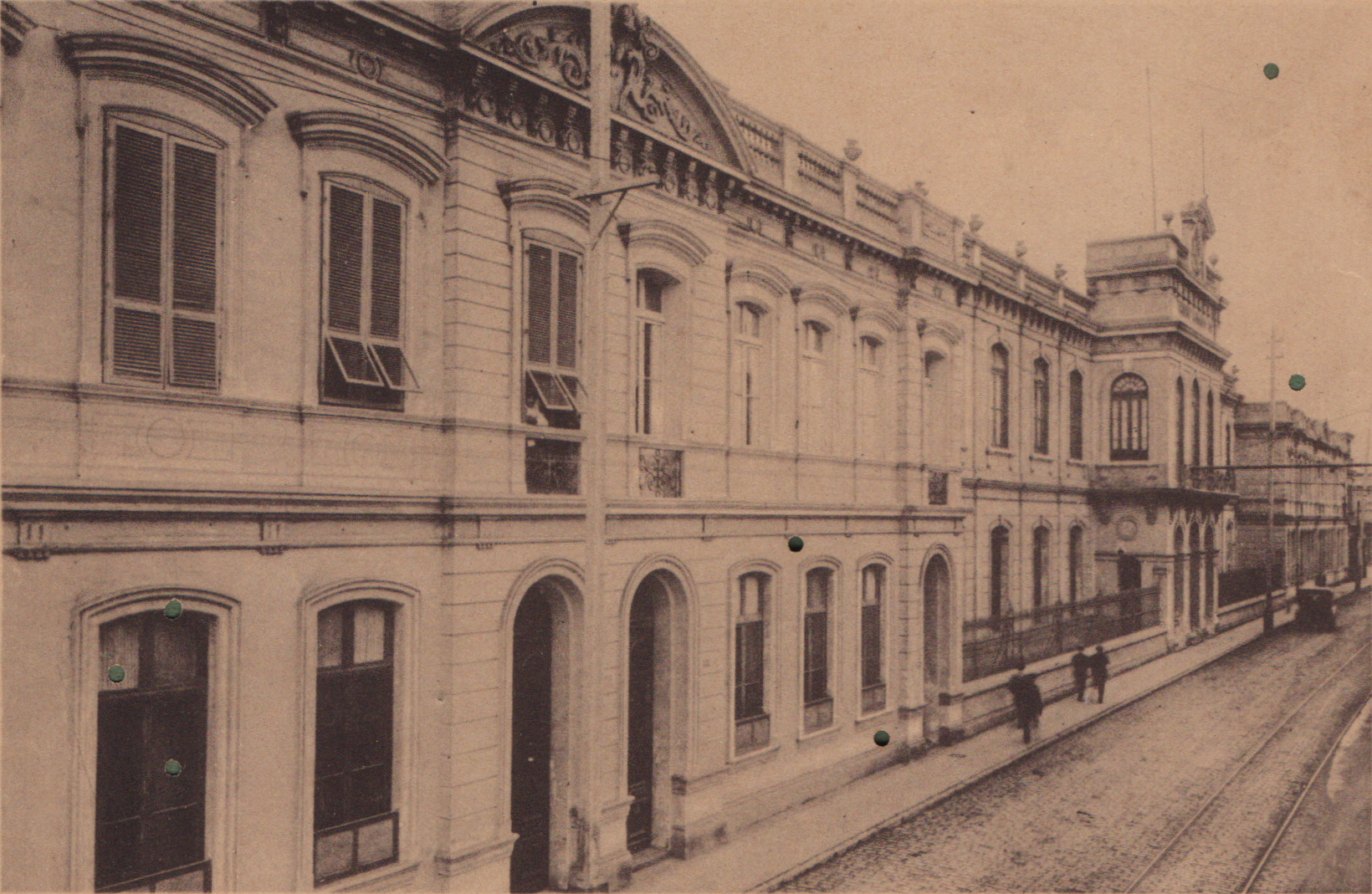
- Former building in central Lima
- San Isidro District, Lima; Peru

Information
- Type: Private school
- Motto: A los sagrados corazones de Jesús y de María, Honor y Gloria (Honour and glory to the Sacred Hearts of Jesus and Mary)
- Religious affiliation: Catholic
- Established: 25 March 1849
- Principal: Paola Díaz Navarro
- Website: ssccbelen.edu.pe

The College of the Sacred Hearts of Belén (Spanish: Colegio de los Sagrados Corazones Belén) is a private Catholic school in San Isidro District, Lima, Peru. Founded in 1849 by French nuns of the Congregation of the Sacred Hearts of Jesus and Mary as a all-girls school in central Lima, it is currently a mixed-sex school.

== History ==
On November 13, 1848, three French nuns of the Congregation of the Sacred Hearts of Jesus and Mary (SS.CC.) landed at the port of Callao, Peru, from Valparaíso, in response to the efforts made since 1838 by the Archbishop of Lima, Francisco de Sales Arrieta, to take charge of the educational formation of Peruvian girls and young women. The school was thus founded on March 25, 1849, on the site of the former Hospital del Espiritu Santo. The nuns took over the management of the Colegio de Educandas that already existed by order of the President. Thus, the first private, religious educational centre for women in Peru was established.

In March 1851, due to the large increase in students, another location was sought and the Sisters of the SS.CC. moved to an old convent of the Mercedarians where there was a well-known altarpiece of Our Lady of Bethlehem from the 16th century, which is preserved to this day in the Chapel of the current premises. These circumstances led to the school beginning to be called by its current name.

=== War of the Pacific ===
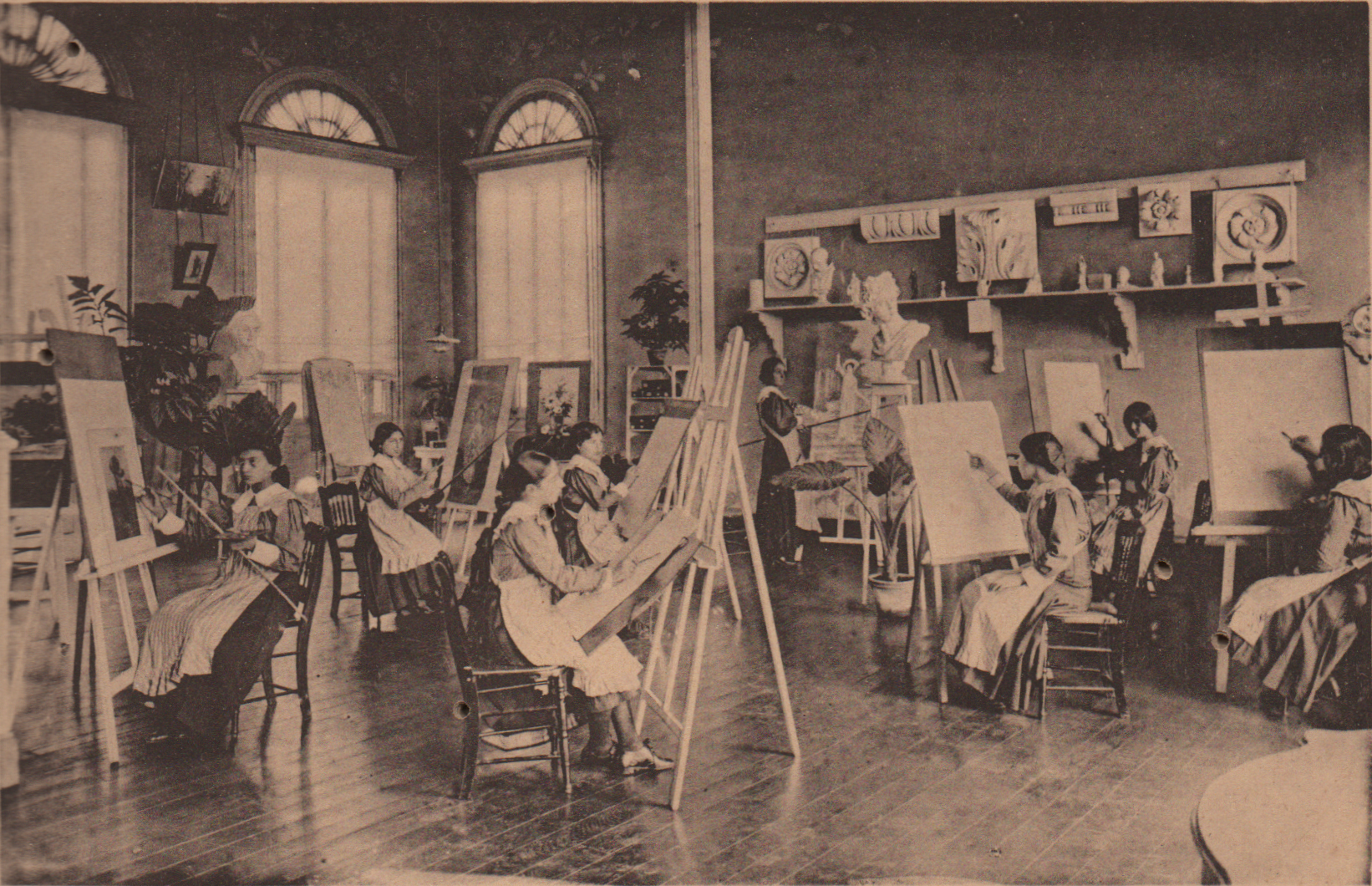
Art classes at the school.

Popular tradition highlights the role of Hermasie Paget (Sombacour; August 8, 1828 — Lima 1980), who arrived in Peru on February 15, 1850, as an educator, during the War of the Pacific. Paget was appointed superior of the school in 1854 and, on July 28, 1877, she received the Gold Diploma as the best teacher in the country, awarded by the Municipality of Lima. When the country began to be invaded by Chilean troops and they approached Lima, the school, where the Sisters of the SS.CC. lived and were educated, opened its doors to numerous families seeking refuge.

According to tradition, as Paget requested the refugees that they pray for the now occupied city, fellow Frenchman Abel-Nicolas Bergasse du Petit-Thouars decided to return to Peru from Valparaíso, writing down in his memoirs that he did so after feeling uneasy with images of the school in his mind, only feeling better after giving the order to set sail for Callao. Petit-Thouars suggested the evacuation of the nuns aboard his ship, La Victorieuse, but Paget instead requested that he meet with Chilean general Manuel Baquedano to avoid the city's destruction, which he did. Paget was honoured after her death with a plaque in 1924, followed by a monument in San Isidro, in 1986.

=== Later history ===
In 1912, a kindergarten for children was opened, which operated for several years. Among its students was Monsignor Augusto Vargas Alzamora S.J., who was the third Cardinal of Peru.

Since its foundation, the school operated in central Lima, but as the population grew, the school was moved to the outskirts of the city. The old Santa Cruz landing field was then acquired and in 1960 the primary school pavilion for young girls was inaugurated. Two years later, all the students moved to the new premises on Álvarez Calderón avenue, in the district of San Isidro, which is where the school is currently located.

Since 2000, the school adopted the coeducation system, and since then, changes have been made to the school's infrastructure and curriculum to adapt to the new system. Currently, it continues to be promoted by the CC.SS., and it also has a large number of students of different nationalities, given the location of the school itself, close to embassies of different countries.

Since 2013, it has been among the top 22 private schools with an "excellent" academic performance in Lima out of a total of 2,439 schools evaluated throughout the country by the Pontifical Catholic University of Peru.

== Notable former pupils ==
- Adriana de Verneuil, writer and wife of Manuel González Prada
- Alejandra de la Guerra, volleyball player
- Carolina Lizárraga, lawyer and jurist
- Chabuca Granda, singer and composer
- Gianella Neyra, actress and model
- Isabel Sabogal, novelist and poet
- Julia Ferrer, poet and writer
- Karina Jordán, actress
- Lastenia Larriva, poet, writer and journalist
- Luisa María Cuculiza, politician
- Matilde Pérez Palacio, educator and politician
- Mávila Huertas, journalist
- Saby Kamalich, actress
- Violeta Correa, journalist and First Lady from 1980 to 1985

== See also ==
- Congregation of the Sacred Hearts of Jesus and Mary
- Colegio Sagrados Corazones Recoleta
