= Colegio Sagrados Corazones Recoleta =

School in Lima, Peru

Coordinates: 12.075°S 76.961°W

Colegio de los Sagrados Corazones Recoleta
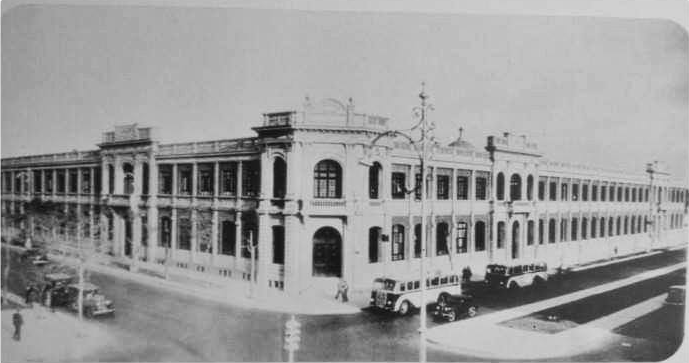
- Former building in central Lima
- La Molina District, Lima; Peru

Information
- Type: Private school
- Motto: Dios, Patria, Cultura y Hogar (God, Fatherland, Culture and Home)
- Religious affiliation: Catholic
- Established: 1893
- Principal: Judith Díaz Vásquez
- Website: recoleta.edu.pe

The Colegio de los Sagrados Corazones Recoleta is a private Catholic school in La Molina District, Lima, Peru. Founded in 1893 by a French mission of the Congregation of the Sacred Hearts of Jesus and Mary as a all-boys school in central Lima, it is currently a mixed-sex school.

== History ==
On September 23, 1884, at the request of a large group of notable people from Lima's society, the Minister of Peru in Chile sent a request to the priest Julio M, Provincial of the Houses of the Congregation of the Sacred Hearts of Jesus and Mary in South America, asking him to establish a modern educational establishment in Lima. After the request was accepted in principle, the priest contacted the then Minister of Justice, Mariano Castro Zaldívar, for the legal part of the establishment, and with the Charity of Lima to determine the area of the land that he would offer for sale. Both the Charity and Castro Zaldívar supported the project.

On February 20, 1885, the then Minister of Government, Juan de Aliaga y Puente, issued a Supreme Resolution authorizing the opening of the school. Afterwards, the purchase of the necessary land was carried out. In the Plazuela de la Recoleta, next to the renovated Church, in a rather modest location previously occupied by the Venturosa alley (Spanish: callejón de la Venturosa), the new school began to operate in 1893.

Its first rector, Father Engelberto Blum, enrolled 22 students in the Primary Section with which the School began. Several of them later stood out in the field of politics, literature and other activities; among them were: José de la Riva-Agüero y Osma, Francisco García Calderón Rey, Ventura García Calderón Rey, Eduardo Barrios Hudtwacker and Juan Bautista de Lavalle y García. In 1942, it inherited a building previously owned by former pupil Riva Agüero, located at the corner of El Sol and Progreso avenues.

In 1962, the school acquired a new terrain in La Molina, where it moved. The building it had previously occupied until that point became the headquarters of Diario Correo, a newspaper, until it was burned down in the 1975 riots. It subsequently suffered a process of partial demolition and facadism, as its corner was demolished and its façade at Wilson Avenue, originally meant to be demolished as a whole, was kept as a result of maintenance works in 2000 to make way for the CompuPlaza Mall. The (now separated) section at Uruguay Avenue was acquired by the Federico Villarreal National University in 1963.

In 1975, it switched to a coeducation system and in 1995 it elected its first non-religious leader. In 2014, it elected its first female director.

== See also ==
- Congregation of the Sacred Hearts of Jesus and Mary
- Colegio Sagrados Corazones Belén
