= Pontifical Catholic University of Peru =

Private university in Peru

Coordinates: 12°04′10″S 77°04′46″W

- Pontificia Universidad Católica del Perú
- Motto: Et lux in tenebris lucet Sé Grande
- Motto in English: And the light shines in the darkness Be Great
- Type: Private Research University
- Established: 1 March 1917 (109 years ago)
- Founder: Jorge Dintilhac
- Affiliations: Consorcio de Universidades, COLUMBUS, FIUC, Asociación Internacional de Universidades (IAU), OUI, RPU, UDUAL, Triple accreditation
- Religious affiliation: Roman Catholic
- Chancellor: Carlos Castillo Mattasoglio
- Rector: Julio del Valle Ballón
- Faculty: 3,122
- Administrative staff: 3,021
- Students: 29,044 (2018)
- Undergraduates: 22,711 (2018)
- Postgraduates: 6,333 (2018)
- Doctoral students: 393 (2018)
- Location: 1801 Universitaria Avenue, San Miguel, Lima, Peru
- Campus: 0.41 square kilometres (0.16 sq mi); Urban
- Colors: Navy blue Maroon
- Website: www.pucp.edu.pe

Pontifical Catholic University of Peru (Spanish: Pontificia Universidad Católica del Perú, PUCP) is a private research university in Lima, Peru. It was founded in 1917 with the support and approval of the Catholic church, being the oldest private institution of higher learning in the country.

The Peruvian historian and politician José de la Riva-Agüero y Osma would become its main benefactor by leaving most of his assets as an inheritance, as it was then a more religious educational institution and linked to the Catholic Church; in contrast to his alma mater and original destination of his inheritance, the National University of San Marcos, where Riva-Agüero considered that liberal ideas and atheism predominated there.

In July 2012, after an apostolic visitation, begun earlier, in 2011, by Peter Erdo, Archbishop of Esztergom-Budapest, Hungary, the Holy See withdrew from the university the right under canon law to use the titles Catholic and Pontifical in its name. Archbishop of Lima, Juan Luis Cipriani, was the main advocate of the Vatican interests. Titles like "Catholic" and "Pontifical" are granted by the Vatican only after meeting legal requirements. In 2014, Pope Francis formed a Commission of Cardinals to find a 'final, consensual solution between the Vatican and the university, comprising Cardinal Erdo, Gérald Lacroix, archbishop of Quebec City, Canada, and Ricardo Ezzati Andrello, archbishop of Santiago de Chile, Chile. In 2016, the Vatican restored the lost titles and determined that the archbishop of Lima would not assume the position of Chancellor of the university.

== History ==
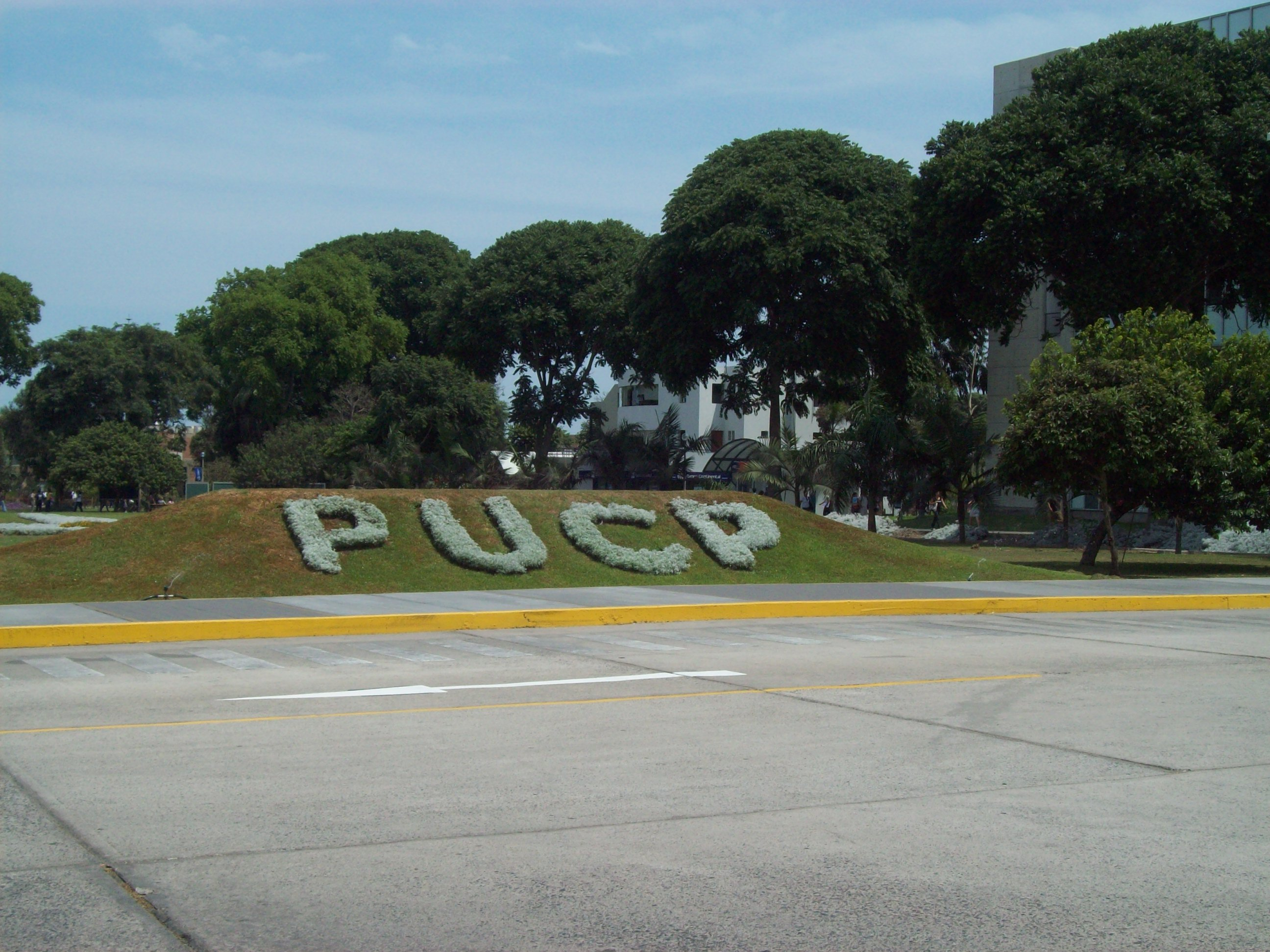
PUCP initials on the campus's main entrance

The Catholic University of Lima began activities in 1917 with two schools: Letters and Laws. The classes began in some free classrooms of the La Recoleta school, near the Plaza Francia.

In 1918, it was renamed the Catholic University of Peru as its founders wanted. In 1932, the Higher Institute of Commercial Sciences, the Women's Institute of Higher Studies, and the Institute of Languages were created. In 1933, when the university had more than 500 students, the Schools of Engineering, and Political and Economical Sciences were established. In 1935, the School of Education was created. In 1936, the Escuela Normal Urbana was created. In 1939, the Academy of Catholic Art was founded, with Adolf Winternitz as its director. The university is still one of only a small number to offer an arts major in Peru. On 30 September 1942, the Holy See granted the university the title of "Pontifical" and it called itself the Pontifical Catholic University of Peru.

In 1944, the Peruvian thinker José de la Riva-Agüero y Osma died, leaving his inheritance to the university, including the Riva-Agüero house, the O'Higgins house and the Pando farm (San Miguel), as well as rural lands in Lima and Pisco. It made him the university's principal benefactor.

Initially, Riva-Agüero thought of leaving his fortune to his alma mater, the Royal and Pontifical University of San Marcos in Lima, but decided to leave it to the Catholic University, because he considered San Marcos to be dominated by liberal ideas.

In 1949, the university obtained its autonomy from the National University of San Marcos, by which it had been governed, according to Law 11003.

In 1953, the Riva-Agüero Institute was inaugurated, in honor of its benefactor. In 1959, the School of Religious Studies and the Faculty of Agronomy were created. Years later, the Faculty of Agronomy was deactivated and its students were transferred to the National Agrarian University. Between 1953 and 1962, the Catholic University was associated with the main international organizations of universities, among which are the International Federation of Catholic Universities and the International Association of Universities. In the 1960s, the university moved from La Recoleta to new buildings at Fundo Pando in San Miguel.

It was granted the character of a national institution on 8 April 1960 with the enactment of Law 13417.

In 1961, the Theater of the Catholic University of Lima was created, with Ricardo Blume as director and unique professor. In 1986, four large packages containing thousands of papers related to Martín Adán were delivered to the university.

In 1992, the Center for Services and Technology Transfer (acronym: CTT-PUCP), currently INNOVAPUCP, was created, aimed at channeling the technological offer of the Catholic University in consultancies to public and private entities in the country. In 1994, the Cultural Center was inaugurated.

In 1996, it joined with four of the most important private universities in the country to create the Consortium of Universities (Consorcio), and years later, together with some regional public universities, the PUCP formed the Peruvian Network of Universities (RPU). In 1997, the first edition of Elcine is celebrated, which ten years became the Festival of Lima.

In 2000, the CENTRUM Business School was founded and in 2002, the Faculty of Architecture and Urbanism. In 2005, the specialty of political science and government, and the faculty of management and senior management were created.

In 2006, due to economic problems that prevented the correct conservation of the tapes, the Lima Film Archive was bought by the PUCP. And in 2006, the official delivery of the musical manuscripts of Daniel Alomía Robles, donated to the Catholic University by his family, was made. Among them is his best-known composition: El cóndor pasa .

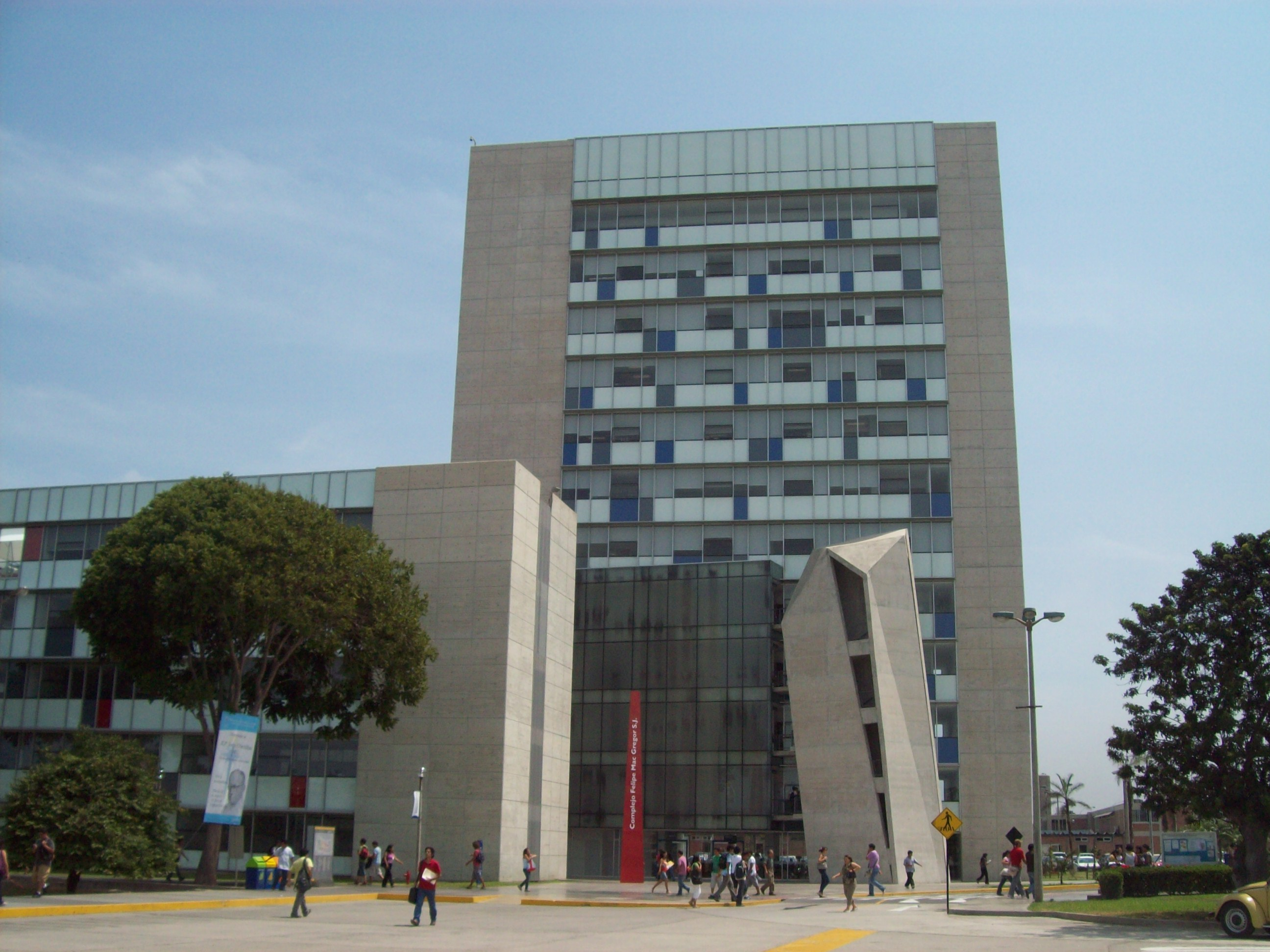
Mac Gregor building, used for administrative functions

In 2008, the McGregor Building is built at its headquarters. In 2014, the Faculty of Performing Arts is created.

In 2016, due to the new university licensing process by the National Superintendence of Higher University Education (SUNEDU), after complying with the basic conditions of educational quality, the PUCP was licensed, being the second private university to do and the first university to be licensed for a period of 10 years (something that only some universities such as Cayetano Heredia, San Agustin, Engineering and San Marcos University achieved).

As of December 2018 the rector and vicerectors faced charges due to mismanagement issues, and Rector Marcial Rubio had to resign after a scandal of fraud, usury, and keeping two sets of accounts. The subsequent administration initiated the return of overcharged fees, and introduced corresponding internal reforms.

== Naming controversy ==
The university is presently experiencing a debate over its taken name. The debate over the pontifical and catholic status of the university dates back to the 1991 Apostolic Exhortation Ex corde Ecclesiae of Pope John Paul II, in which the pope legislated the essential norms for institutes of higher education which wished to be known as "Catholic." Catholic authorities claim that for twenty years these norms were not implemented by the university, despite Vatican requests. It is alleged that the university had refused to allow the Peruvian bishops an official seat on the board of governance and access to the administration of bequests and other sources of funding.

In October 2011, Cardinal Péter Erdő, 59, Metropolitan Archbishop of Esztergom-Budapest, President of the Hungarian Episcopal Conference was named apostolic visitor to the college. Erdő had requested that the university implement the norms by Easter 2012.

Under canon law, the pontifical title allows certain acknowledged Catholic universities to obtain various ecclesiastical degrees aside from normal civil degrees. Certain seminaries require, for instance, that those teaching classes of theology and canon law hold pontifical degrees in those subjects only obtainable with the permission and recognition by the Holy See.

In a televised interview with Peruvian channel RPP TV, the attorney for the Archdiocese of Lima, Natale Amprimo, issued a press statement stating that the Archdiocese may decide to file a lawsuit against the university if they do not revise their name soon. Amprimo cited article 83 of the P.U.C.P. University Act, i.e. "goods coming from donations, legacies and bequests are subject to the regime established by the donor".

In a papal decree dated 11 July 2012, the Vatican's Cardinal Secretary of State Tarcisio Bertone withdrew the titles of "Pontificia" and "Catolica" from the university, citing disagreements with the current governing body. The title "Pontificia" was previously granted to the university on 30 September 1942, by the Holy See which was decreed and signed by Pope Pius XII.

The canonical decree was approved by Pope Benedict XVI, upon whom the university had conferred the academic title of Doctor Honoris causa in 1986, when he was Cardinal Joseph Ratzinger.

On 22 July 2012, the rector of the university, Marcial Rubio, released a press statement refusing to relinquish the titles Catholic and Pontifical as previously granted by Pope Pius XII, citing that the situation is "regrettable" but the title remains their "official name and will continue to use as such so long as its convenient" to their governing body. Rubio also asserted that the university is governed by the civil laws of Peru, not by ecclesiastical canon law.

On 26 July 2012, in a CNN televised interview, Marcial Rubio noted that the university may change the official name of the school in the future but only according to a timeline and decision of the present governing board, not in response to any pressure from the Pope or the Holy See. Furthermore, Rubio said that the university will continue to issue its own secular degrees and diplomas which the school considers lawful and valid in Peru.

In 2016, the Vatican restored the lost titles.

== Organization ==
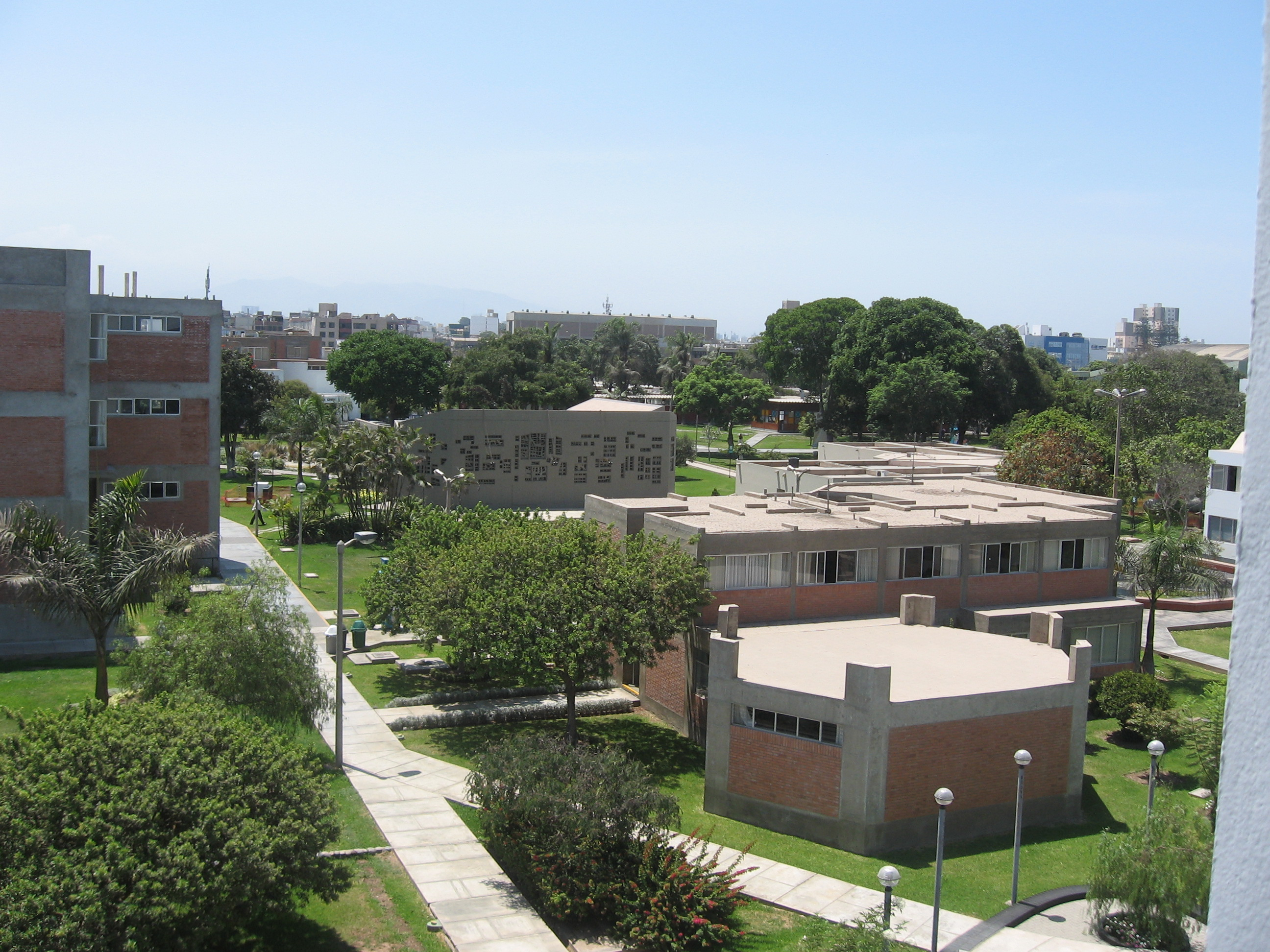
A view from the 4th floor of Building Zeta (Z)

There are currently 23,000 undergraduate students pursuing 38 different specialties in 10 schools. Its main campus is located in the Lima district of San Miguel, with the newly built Mac Gregor complex.

Outside the main campus there are other facilities such as the IC (Idiomas Católica), a language-learning center, the Confucius Institute PUCP, the cultural center (CCPUCP) located in the district of San Isidro. CENTRUM, a center for business studies featuring doctoral level and MBA programs and located in the district of Santiago de Surco, is also part of PUCP. Inside, there is a Pastoral Counseling Center (CAPU).

Student body

- Undergraduate: 22,711
- Postgraduates: 6,333
- Doctoral: 393

== Rankings ==
University rankings

Global – Overall
- QS World: =345 (2026)
- THE World: 1501+ (2025)
- USNWR Global: 1189 (2024)

Together with the National University of San Marcos and the Cayetano Heredia University, the Pontifical Catholic University of Peru is one of the only three Peruvian universities which has managed to rank first nationally in certain editions of different major internationally university rankings.

== See also ==
- List of universities in Peru
- National University of San Marcos
- Consortium of Universities
