= Tongod District =

Tongod District may refer to:

- Tongod District, Malaysia
- Tongod District, Peru
