= Nanchoc District =

Nanchoc
- District
- Location in Peru
- Coordinates: 6.9591°S 79.2430°W
- Country: Peru
- Region: Cajamarca
- Province: San Miguel
- Founded: December 2, 1958
- Capital: Nanchoc

Area
  - Total: 359 km^{2} (139 sq mi)
- Elevation: 400 m (1,300 ft)

Population (Peru 2017 Census)
  - Total: 1,368
  - Density: 3.81/km^{2} (9.87/sq mi)
- Time zone: UTC-5 (PET)
- UBIGEO: 061108

Nanchoc District is one of thirteen districts of San Miguel Province in the Cajamarca Region of Peru. In 2017, the district had an area of 359 square kilometres (139 sq mi) and a population of 1,368. The capital of the district is the town of Nanchoc which had a population of 332 in 2017. The Nanchoc River, a tributary of the Zaña River, bisects the district.

Nanchoc is located in an irrigated and cultivated valley about 1 kilometre (0.62 miles) wide and 60 kilometres (37 miles) from the Pacific Ocean to the west. Between the valley and the ocean is a low range of mountains and the Peruvian coastal desert. East of Nanchoc the Andes rise sharply and the greater precipitation in the Andes feeds the Nanchoc River and its tributaries, permitting irrigated agriculture to flourish in the valley.

== History ==
Nanchoc district was created 2 December 1958 by Law No. 13039 del 2, during the second government of President Manuel Prado Ugarteche. At the time the district included the population centers of Carahuasi, Bolívar, El Espino, Trigal, La Aventuraza, El Diamante, La Tambora and Tingues. Most of these communities were separated from Nanchoc district in 1989 and placed in Bolivar District.

== Archaeology ==
On the western side of the Nanchoc river, about 3 kilometres (1.9 miles) from the town of Nanchoc, archaeologist Tom Dillehay found evidence of the oldest known irrigation canals in the Americas, radiocarbon dated to at least 3400 BCE and possibly as old as 4700 BCE. The canals built by the people of Nanchoc at that time were utilized to irrigate crops such as peanuts, squash, manioc, and chenopods, a relative of Quinoa.
