= Casa Matusita =

Building in Lima, Peru

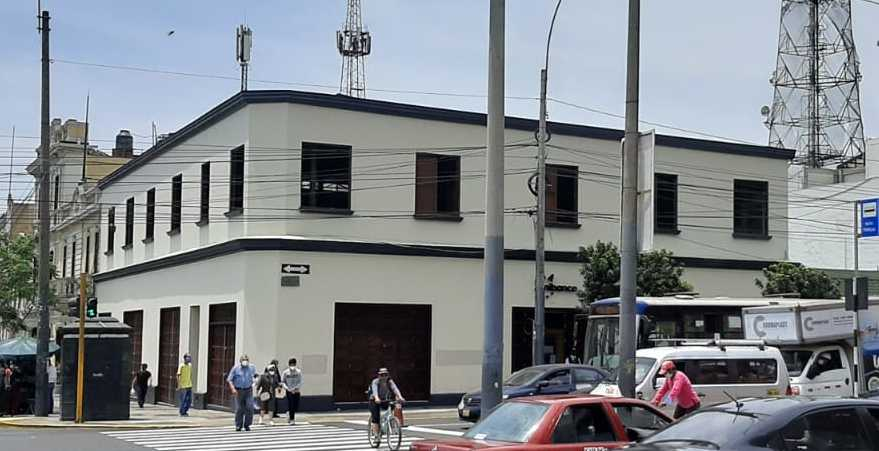

General information
- Architectural style: Spanish Revival
- Location: Av. Garcilaso de la Vega 1390, Lima, Peru
- Completed: 1909
- Owner: Matusita S.A. (until 2005)

The Casa Matusita is a building located at the intersection of Garcilaso de la Vega and España avenues in the center of Lima, Peru. It is known for the popular belief of being a place where paranormal activity exists.

== History ==
In 1862, the Lima Penitentiary was inaugurated in front of what would become the house. The prison and its surroundings are claimed to have served in those times as interrogation centers for common and military criminals, especially in the days of the War of the Pacific. The house was built in 1909, and its first owner was Dr. Carlos Ramírez, later belonging to the Andrade family.

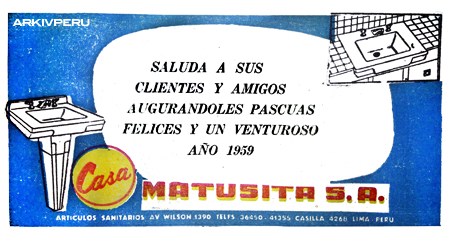
1959 advertisement for Matusita S.A.

Its name comes from Matusita S.A., a hardware company that rented the first floor of the building as a warehouse from the 1950s until 2005.

In 2016, the second floor was demolished due to the declaration of a dilapidated state issued by the Municipality of Lima. The building's owner, Ladislao Thierry Tiry, reached an agreement with the bank that rented the first level to remodel this floor, and rebuild the second with lightweight material.

=== Urban legends ===
The legends associated with the building are varied, from its origin to paranormal events that supposedly occurred.

One such legend is one of Parvaneh Dervaspa, a Persian woman who is claimed to have arrived to the port of Callao on August 25, 1753, and settled in the house in the mid 18th century, being accused of witchcraft by the Holy Inquisition and burned at the stake on October 23 of the next year after her confession under duress.

Another legend mentions a mass poisoning incident, where a family that lived in the building accidentally consumed a hallucinogenic substance that resulted in the deaths of all participants, being characterized by their screaming. Similar stories feature claims of familicides in the building.

At the end of the 1970s, the Argentine Humberto Vílchez Vera, host of the television program Los fantasmas se divierten, made a bet that he was capable of staying seven days on the second floor of the building. Vílchez allegedly left the place after two hours and had to be admitted to a mental hospital for a year, after which he disappeared. Years later, in his book El cazador de fantasmas, the TV host denied the urban legend, saying that such events never happened, and the only thing he wanted was to increase his ratings.

=== Conspiracy theories ===
There is a conspiracy theory that indicates that the origin of the urban legends of ghosts in the building were created and disseminated by the CIA to prevent the building's use for espionage, due to the fact that the U.S. embassy in Lima was located across the street from its construction in the late 1940s to the early 1990s, after which it was replaced by a hospìtal.

== See also ==
- Cementerio Presbítero Matías Maestro
- Real Felipe Fortress
