= San Silvestre de Cochan District =

Coordinates: 6.9421°S 78.7253°W

San Silvestre de Cochan Quchan
- District
- Interactive map of San Silvestre de Cochan
- Country: Peru
- Region: Cajamarca
- Province: San Miguel
- Founded: January 8, 1966
- Capital: San Silvestre de Cochan

Government
  - Mayor: Concepcion Favio Jovito Delgado Vargas

Area
  - Total: 131.62 km^{2} (50.82 sq mi)
- Elevation: 2,900 m (9,500 ft)

Population (2005 census)
  - Total: 4,813
  - Density: 36.57/km^{2} (94.71/sq mi)
- Time zone: UTC-5 (PET)
- UBIGEO: 061111

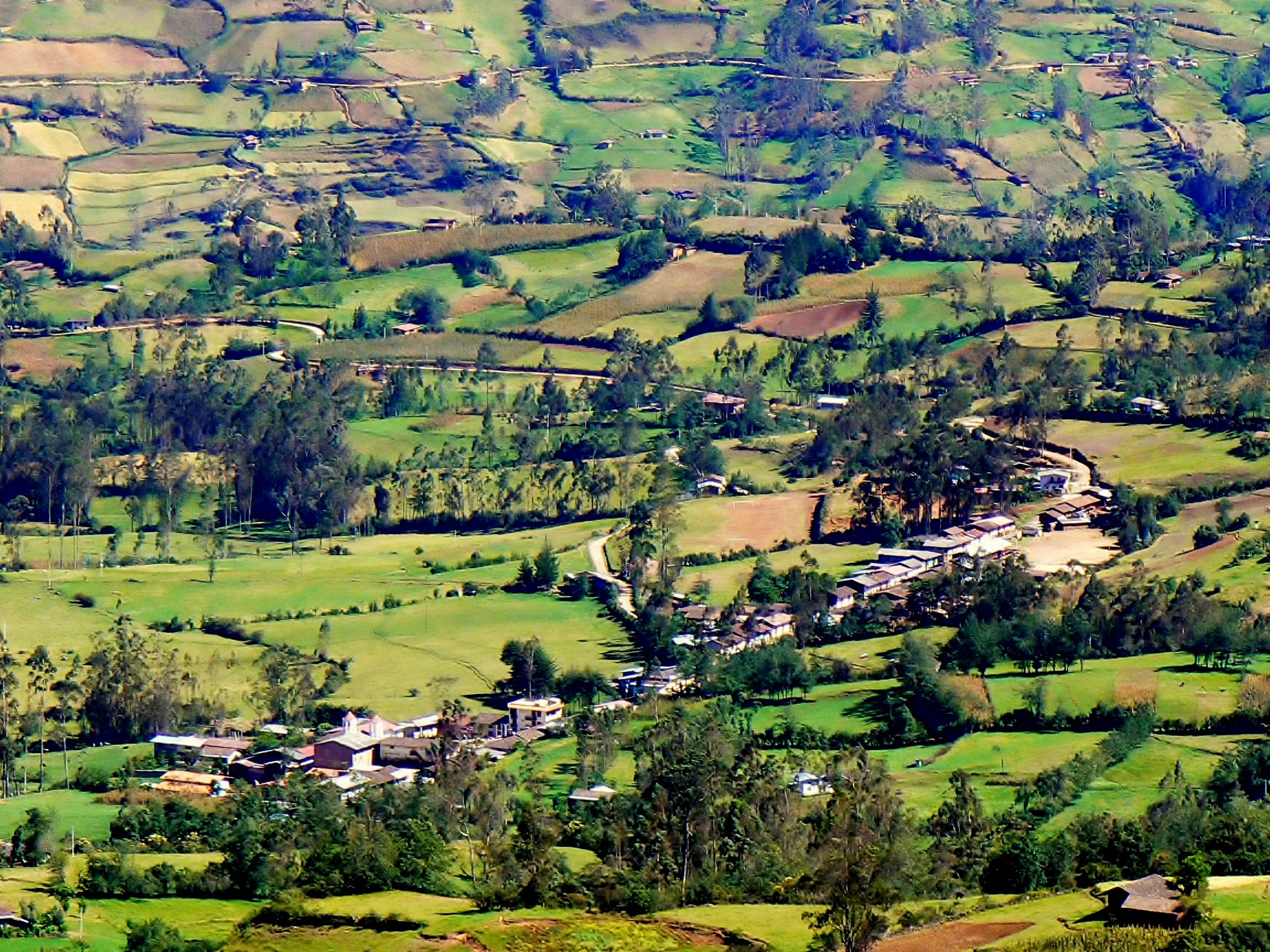

San Silvestre de Cochan District is one of thirteen districts of the province San Miguel in Peru.
