= Pinacotheca of Lima =

Pinacotheca in Peru

Coordinates: 12°03′11″S 77°02′17″W

- Pinacoteca Municipal Ignacio Merino
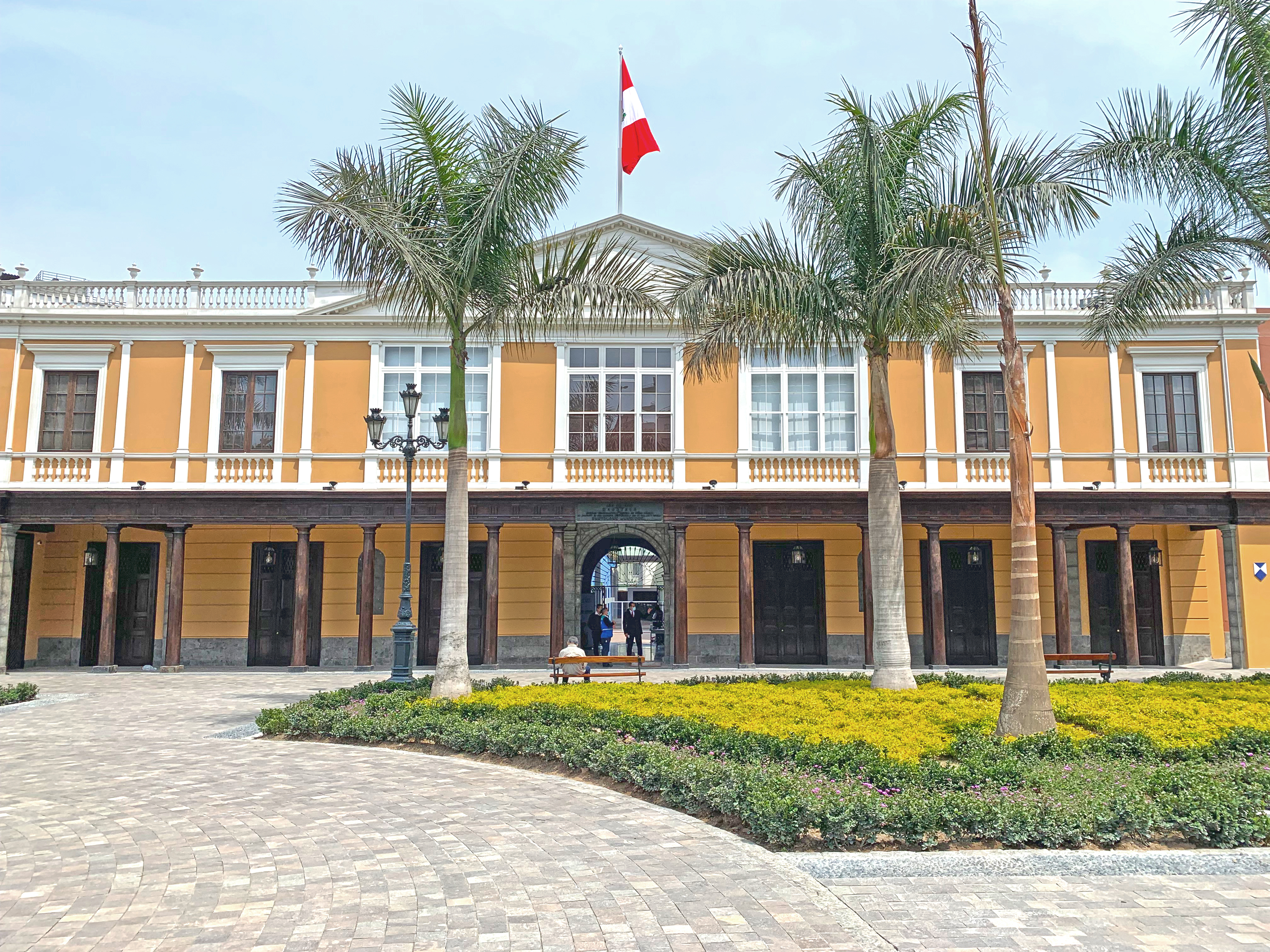
- Established: 29 May 1925
- Location: Plaza Francia, Lima
- Type: Pinacotheca

The Ignacio Merino Municipal Pinacotheca (Spanish: Pinacoteca Municipal Ignacio Merino), also known as the Pinacotheca of Lima (Spanish: Pinacoteca de Lima), is a pinacotheca housed in the Hospicio Manrique, located at the Plaza Francia, part of the historic centre of Lima, Peru.

== History ==
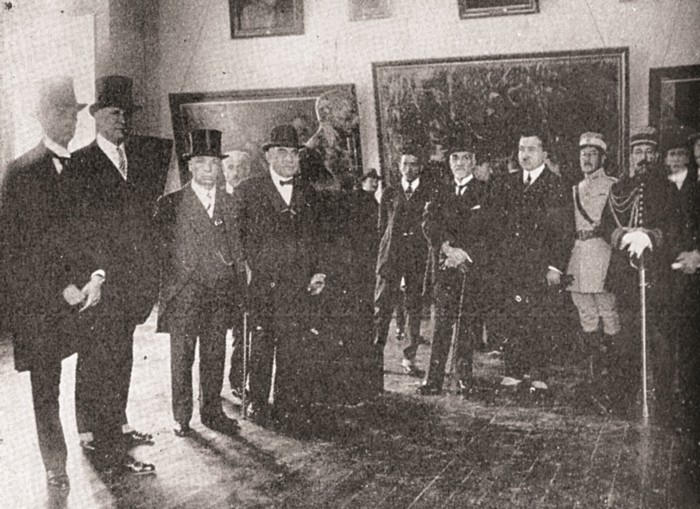
Inauguration in 1925.

The museum was inaugurated in 1925, under the presidency of Augusto B. Leguía and under the mayoralty of Pedro José Rada y Gamio, as the Pinacoteca Municipal. It is named after Peruvian painter Ignacio Merino, and also serves as the largest collection of his paintings. However, the collection of Merino's works exists since 1876, when 56 paintings and a briefcase with other works were brought from Paris to Lima, as per his will.

In addition to Merino's works, it also houses paintings by Francisco Laso, Daniel Hernández Morillo, Teófilo Castillo, José Sabogal, Tilsa Tsuchiya, Ángel Chávez, Fernando De Szyszlo, and others.

In 2020, Fernando Torres, cultural manager of the museum, announced that its collection would be moved to the Metropolitan Museum of Lima. As of 2023, however, this has not yet taken place, as the museum continues to reside in the Plaza Francia.

== See also ==
- Iglesia de la Recoleta (Lima)
- Statue of Liberty (Peru)
