= San Gregorio District =

Coordinates: 7.0576°S 79.0949°W

San Gregorio
- District
- Interactive map of San Gregorio
- Country: Peru
- Region: Cajamarca
- Province: San Miguel
- Founded: January 2, 1857
- Capital: San Gregorio

Government
  - Mayor: Wilder Tito Alayo Mendoza

Area
  - Total: 308.05 km^{2} (118.94 sq mi)
- Elevation: 1,854 m (6,083 ft)

Population (2005 census)
  - Total: 2,688
  - Density: 8.726/km^{2} (22.60/sq mi)
- Time zone: UTC-5 (PET)
- UBIGEO: 061110

San Gregorio District is one of thirteen districts of the province San Miguel in Peru.
