= Huayrapongo =

Archaeological site in Peru

- Ventanillas de la Playa El Tambo
- Location within Peru
- 6°54′13.1″S 78°45′14.3″W
- Location: San Miguel Province, Cajamarca

Huayrapongo (possibly from Quechua wayra wind, punku door) also known as Ventanillas de la Playa El Tambo, is an archaeological site in Peru. It is situated in the Cajamarca Region, San Miguel Province, Llapa District. The site lies on the mountain Huayrapongo.
