= Llapa District =

Coordinates: 10.8364°S 75.2100°W

Llapa
- District
- Interactive map of Llapa
- Country: Peru
- Region: Cajamarca
- Province: San Miguel
- Founded: January 2, 1857
- Capital: Llapa

Government
  - Mayor: José Marciano Suarez Suarez

Area
  - Total: 132.68 km^{2} (51.23 sq mi)
- Elevation: 2,928 m (9,606 ft)

Population (2005 census)
  - Total: 5,576
  - Density: 42.03/km^{2} (108.8/sq mi)
- Time zone: UTC-5 (PET)
- UBIGEO: 061107

Llapa District is one of thirteen districts of the province San Miguel in Peru.

== See also ==
- Wayra Punku
