= Catilluc District =

Coordinates: 6.8018°S 78.7783°W

Catilluc
- District
- Interactive map of Catilluc
- Country: Peru
- Region: Cajamarca
- Province: San Miguel
- Founded: June 19, 1989
- Capital: Catilluc

Government
  - Mayor: José Guilberto Becerra Terrones

Area
  - Total: 197.31 km^{2} (76.18 sq mi)
- Elevation: 2,750 m (9,020 ft)

Population (2005 census)
  - Total: 3,297
  - Density: 16.71/km^{2} (43.28/sq mi)
- Time zone: UTC-5 (PET)
- UBIGEO: 061104

Catilluc District is one of thirteen districts of the province San Miguel in Peru.
