= San Miguel province =

Coordinates: 7°00′S 78°51′W

San Miguel
- Province
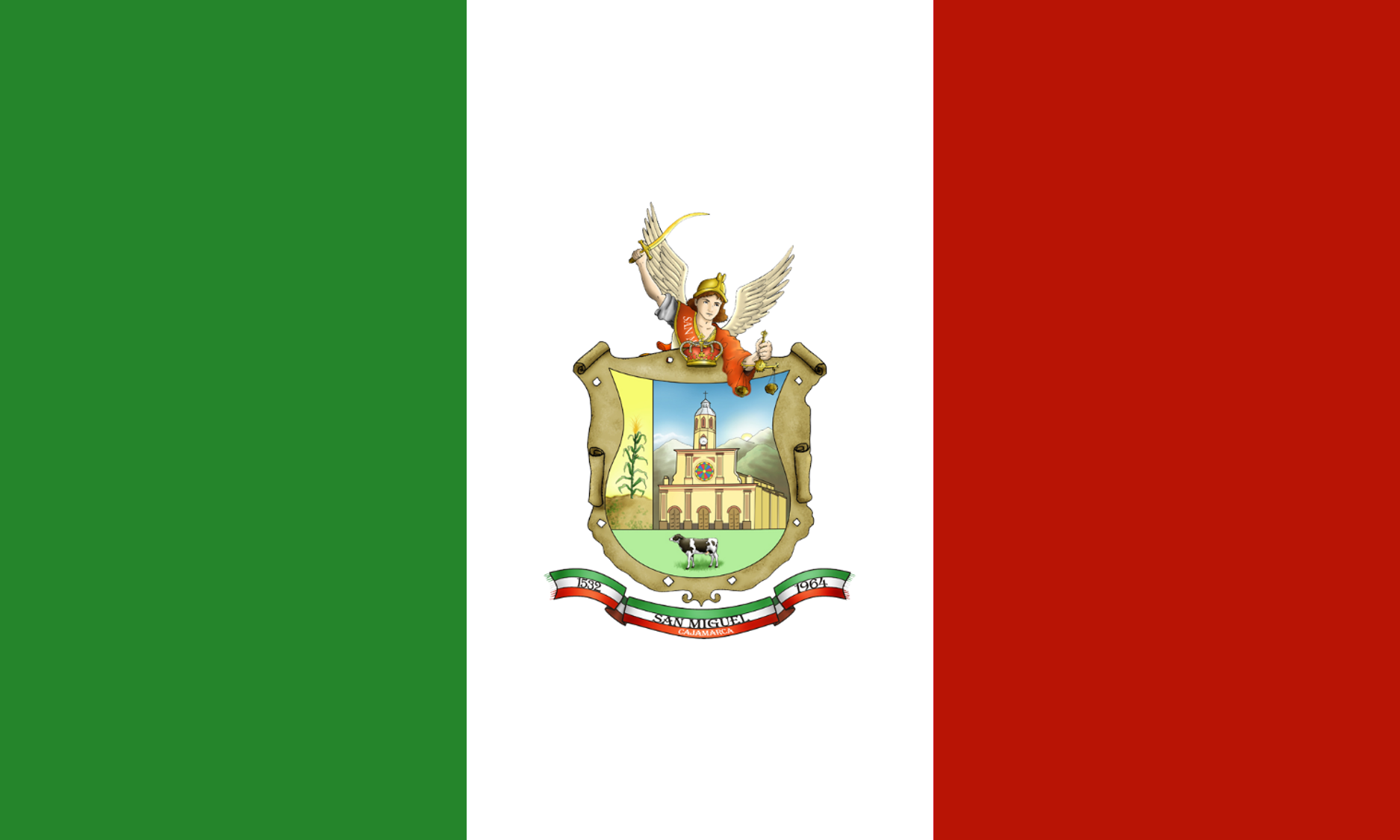
- Flag Coat of arms

- Location of San Miguel in the Cajamarca Region
- Country: Peru
- Region: Cajamarca
- Founded: September 29, 1964
- Capital: San Miguel de Pallaques

Government
  - Mayor: Lorenzo Chingay (2019-2022)

Area
  - Total: 2,542.08 km^{2} (981.50 sq mi)

Population
  - Total: 46,043
  - Density: 18.112/km^{2} (46.911/sq mi)
- UBIGEO: 0611
- Website: www.munisanmiguel-cajamarca.com

San Miguel is one of the thirteen provinces in the Cajamarca Region of Peru. It was created by Law No. 15152 on September 29, 1964, by president Fernando Belaunde Terry. It has a mountainous territory which varies in height from 500 to more than 4,000 metres (1,600–13,000 ft) above sea level. As a result, there is a great diversity of climates ranging from hot and dry at lower altitudes to cold and rainy at higher levels. Herding is an important economic activity thanks to the existence of extensive pastures. Its main product is cow's milk which is either sold outside the province or transformed into dairy products such as cheese. There are several gold mines in production in the higher regions of the province. There's also an important handicraft industry mainly devoted to textiles made out of cotton or wool.

== Archaeology ==
The oldest known irrigation canals in the Americas are located in the Nanchoc District of the province of San Miguel. The canals in the Zaña Valley have been radiocarbon dated to 3400 BCE, and possibly date to 4700 BCE.

== Political division ==
The province is divided into thirteen districts, namely:

- San Miguel
- Bolívar
- Calquis
- Catilluc
- El Prado
- La Florida
- Llapa
- Nanchoc
- Niepos
- San Gregorio
- San Silvestre de Cochan
- Tongod
- Unión Agua Blanca

== See also ==
- Wayra Punku
