= Niepos District =

Coordinates: 6.9271°S 79.1285°W

Niepos
- District
- Interactive map of Niepos
- Country: Peru
- Region: Cajamarca
- Province: San Miguel
- Capital: Niepos

Government
  - Mayor: Cesar Wilmer Silva Zelada

Area
  - Total: 158.88 km^{2} (61.34 sq mi)
- Elevation: 2,446 m (8,025 ft)

Population (2005 census)
  - Total: 4,574
  - Density: 28.79/km^{2} (74.56/sq mi)
- Time zone: UTC-5 (PET)
- UBIGEO: 061109

Niepos District is one of thirteen districts of the province San Miguel in Peru.
