= El Prado District =

Coordinates: 7.0332°S 79.0111°W

El Prado
- District
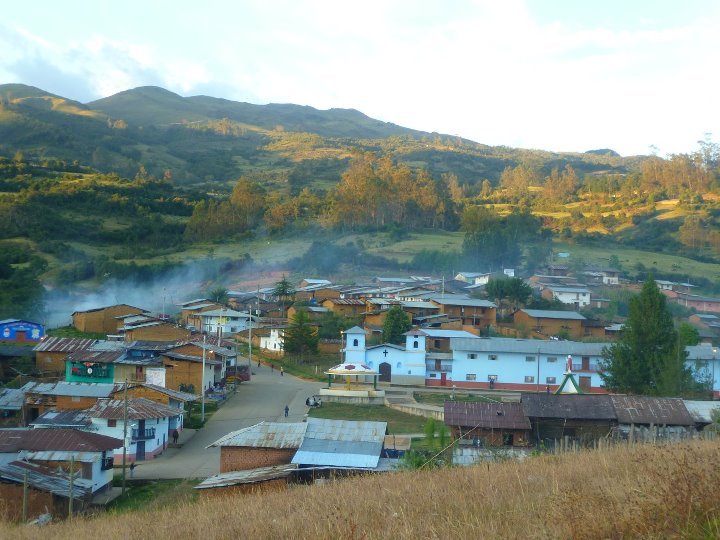
- Interactive map of El Prado
- Country: Peru
- Region: Cajamarca
- Province: San Miguel
- Founded: September 20, 1984
- Capital: El Prado

Government
  - Mayor: Pepe Neri Serrano Paucar

Area
  - Total: 71.44 km^{2} (27.58 sq mi)
- Elevation: 2,830 m (9,280 ft)

Population (2005 census)
  - Total: 2,084
  - Density: 29.17/km^{2} (75.55/sq mi)
- Time zone: UTC-5 (PET)
- UBIGEO: 061105

El Prado District is one of thirteen districts of the province San Miguel in Peru.
