= San Miguel de Pallaques =

- Town
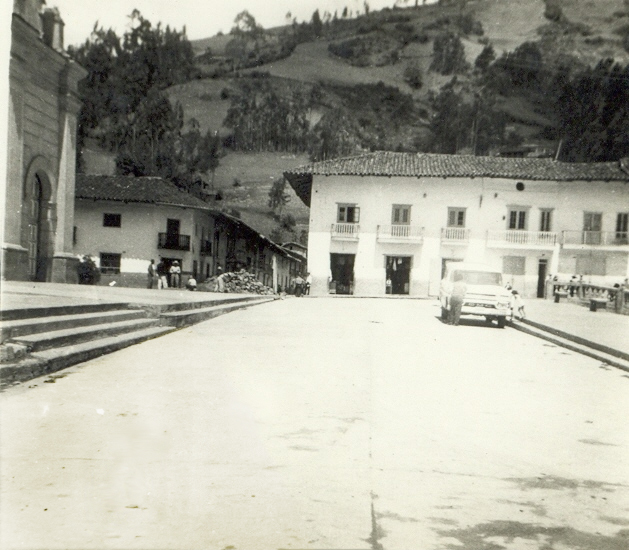
- Plaza of San Miguel de Pallaques in 1967

- Location within Peru
- Coordinates: 7°00′02″S 78°51′05″W
- Country: Peru
- Region: Cajamarca
- Province: San Miguel
- District: San Miguel
- Time zone: UTC-5 (PET)

San Miguel de Pallaques is a town in northern Peru, capital of San Miguel Province in Cajamarca Region. A site for the creation of white and ochre ponchos, it was declared a historical monument on 26 June 1987.
