= Statue of Liberty (Peru) =

Monument in Lima, Peru

Coordinates: 12°03′12″S 77°02′16″W

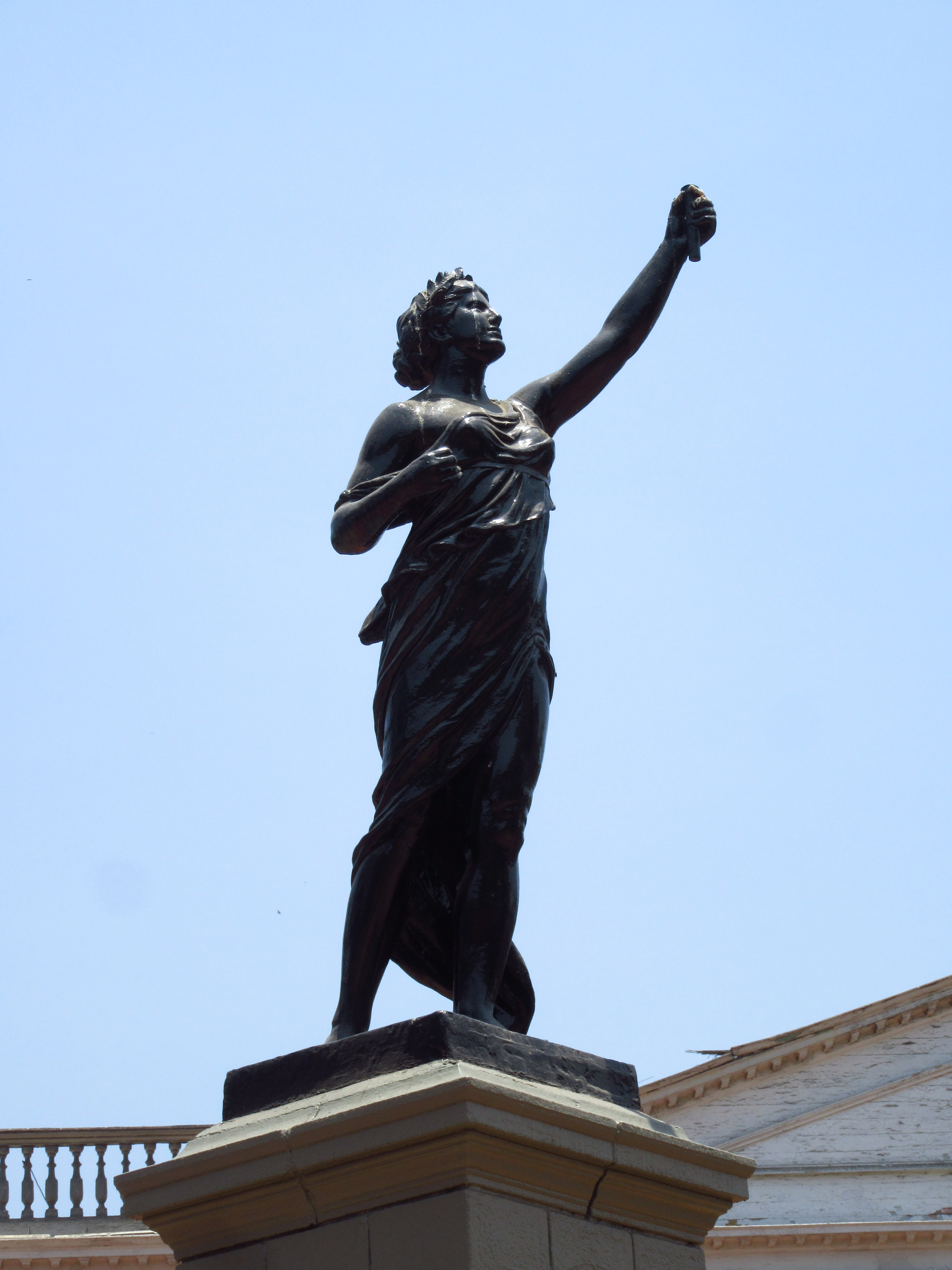
- The statue in 2017 prior to its 2019 restoration
- Location: Historic Centre of Lima
- Designer: René Bertrand-Boutée
- Opening date: 1926
- Restored date: 2019

The Statue of Liberty (Spanish: Estatua de La Libertad) is a bronze sculpture located in the Plaza Francia of the historic centre of Lima, Peru. It was made in 1926 according to the design of the French sculptor René Bertrand-Boutée and cast by Eugène Soleau. It is a one-piece bronze sculpture about 2 metres high and represents a standing female figure, dressed in a light tunic and with a laurel wreath on her head. This is installed on a 4.30 m high pedestal. The sculpture and the Plaza Francia were declared a monumental urban environment in 1972. In 2018, La Libertad was declared Cultural Heritage of the Nation.

== History ==
One of the most important events of the 20th century in Peru was the celebration held to commemorate the Centennial of the Independence of Peru, which took place in 1921 during the second government of President Augusto B. Leguía. The various foreign colonies residing in Lima organized to make a gift to the city on the occasion of said celebration and, among them, the French colony residing in Lima organized a commission to give a sculpture to the city; this commission had thought of locating the sculpture in the Plaza Mayor. However, the commission failed to have the gift ready on time, which is why the French colony was the only one that did not give anything to Peru for said event.

In 1925 the project of the sculpture of was resumed; For this, a new commission was created, headed by the French engineer Michel Fort, which was in charge of raising the money for the work. To choose the sculpture, an international competition was held in Rome in 1925. The winner was René Bertrand-Boutée, a French sculptor who was the author of many busts and bronze sculptures.

The works of the installation of the statue and the base were done by Florentino Palma. White granite from Amancaes was used. In addition to the sculpture, a bronze plaque that read "Homage from the French colony to the Republic of Peru on the first centenary of its Independence" was cast and carved. The sculpture was accompanied by four 4.55 m bronze and iron ornamental chandeliers. The monument was placed in a square built at the expense of the government. The work was carried out by the important construction company "Foundation".

=== Location ===
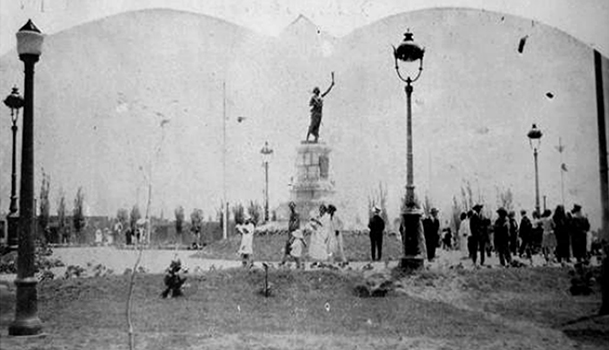
The statue in 1926.

As often happens with Lima monuments, the Freedom Monument has undergone changes in location. Initially the monument was placed in a square built in 1922 at the expense of the government, called Plaza de la Libertad. The work was in charge of the important construction company "Foundation", and it was inaugurated on January 17, 1926. The inauguration ceremony was attended by President Augusto B. Leguía, the Archbishop of Lima, Emilio Lissón and the diplomatic representatives of France. During the inauguration of the monument, the engineer Michel Fort thanked President Leguía for the sculpture of freedom giving its name to the square and also for the construction of France Avenue in gratitude.

Francia avenue started from Libertad square and cut diagonally to the Santa Beatriz urbanization until it reached the then Leguía avenue (today Arequipa avenue). After the government of Leguía, the name of France Ave. would be changed to Avenida del Soldado Desconocido, currently being known as Nicolás Araníbar avenue.

In 1935 the sculpture was moved from its initial location in Plaza Libertad to the old Plaza de la Recoleta, which since 1911 had been renamed Plaza Francia. It is in this place that the sculpture has remained to this day, although in the renovations that have been carried out in the square its location has had notable variations.

Currently, the sculpture of Liberty is located in a sector of the square corresponding -approximately- to the intersection of the imaginary extension of the Camaná and Tambo de Belén shreds, near the facades of the Manrique Hospice and the Church of the Sacred Hearts (Recoleta); the sculpture is oriented in such a way that Liberty points with the raised torch towards the east.

== Restoration ==
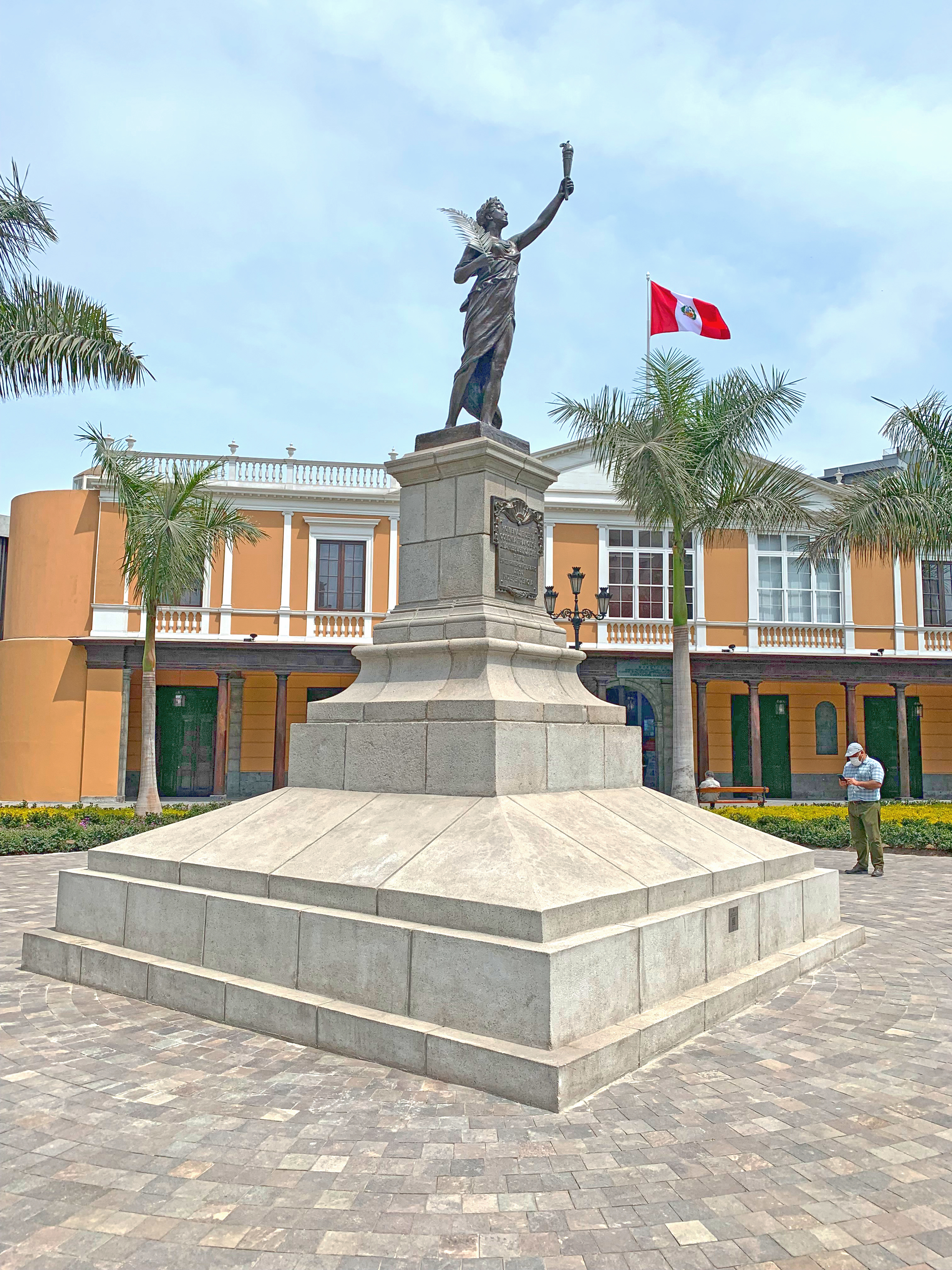
The statue in 2021 after its restoration.

The restoration process contemplated the aesthetic historical study, as well as the qualitative and quantitative analysis of the materials, with the purpose of determining the technique of execution of the work and foreign materials. At the same time, the conservation and restoration treatment was carried out, based on the minimum intervention, under international guidelines.

First, a diagnosis of the initial state of the sculpture, stratigraphic coves, temperature and humidity monitoring was made. Then a historical, artistic study was carried out in order to recover the original, aesthetic and monumental values of Liberty. Several layers of paint that had been placed on the bronze of the sculpture and the stone elements of the pedestal that did not allow to appreciate their original characteristics have been removed. When the painting was removed from the bronze, it was possible to discover the signature of the sculptor and the stamp of the foundry.

Due to the acts of vandalism to which the sculptural composition had been exposed, replicas of the elements that were lost over time were placed, such as the torch that he carried in his left hand, the laurel palm that he carried in his right and the original commemorative plaque that was placed on the monument in 1926. Likewise, the lower part of the pedestal that had disappeared has been restored and a part of the stone pedestal that had been covered with concrete has been released.

In 2019, PROLIMA, a dependency of the Lima commune, carried out the restoration of said sculpture. After a set of multidisciplinary studies, a three-month recovery work was carried out. In this process, the Torch and the inauguration commemorative plaque that had been stolen were restored. The unveiling of the restored work took place on September 25, 2019, and was attended by the mayor of Lima, Jorge Muñoz Wells; the French ambassador, Antoine Grassin; and the manager, Luis Martín Bogdanovich.

== See also ==
- Iglesia de la Recoleta (Lima), located behind the statue
- Pinacotheca of Lima

== Bibliography ==
- Hamann Mazuré, Johanna (2011). Monumentos públicos y espacios urbanos de Lima 1919-1930 (in Spanish). Universitat de Barcelona. p. 9788469417676. OCLC 804953893.
- Lima 1919-1930. La Lima de Leguía (in Spanish). Lima: UNMSM. 2007.
