= Calquis District =

Coordinates: 6.9105°S 79.0531°W

Calquis
- District
- Interactive map of Calquis
- Country: Peru
- Region: Cajamarca
- Province: San Miguel
- Founded: 19 March 1965
- Capital: Calquis

Government
  - Mayor: Hector Quiliche Zambrano

Area
  - Total: 339 km^{2} (131 sq mi)
- Elevation: 2,855 m (9,367 ft)

Population (2005 census)
  - Total: 4,694
  - Density: 13.8/km^{2} (35.9/sq mi)
- Time zone: UTC-5 (PET)
- UBIGEO: 061103

Calquis District is one of thirteen districts of the province San Miguel in Peru.
