= Unión Agua Blanca District =

Coordinates: 7.0788°S 79.0410°W

Unión Agua Blanca
- District
- Interactive map of Unión Agua Blanca
- Country: Peru
- Region: Cajamarca
- Province: San Miguel
- Founded: September 26, 1984
- Capital: Agua Blanca

Government
  - Mayor: Enrique Alfonso Agurto Vasquez

Area
  - Total: 171.71 km^{2} (66.30 sq mi)
- Elevation: 2,900 m (9,500 ft)

Population (2005 census)
  - Total: 3,973
  - Density: 23.14/km^{2} (59.93/sq mi)
- Time zone: UTC-5 (PET)
- UBIGEO: 061113

Unión Agua Blanca District is one of thirteen districts of the province San Miguel in Peru.
