= Inca Garcilaso de la Vega Avenue =

Avenue in Lima, Peru

Avenida Inca Garcilaso de la Vega
- El Sol, Wilson
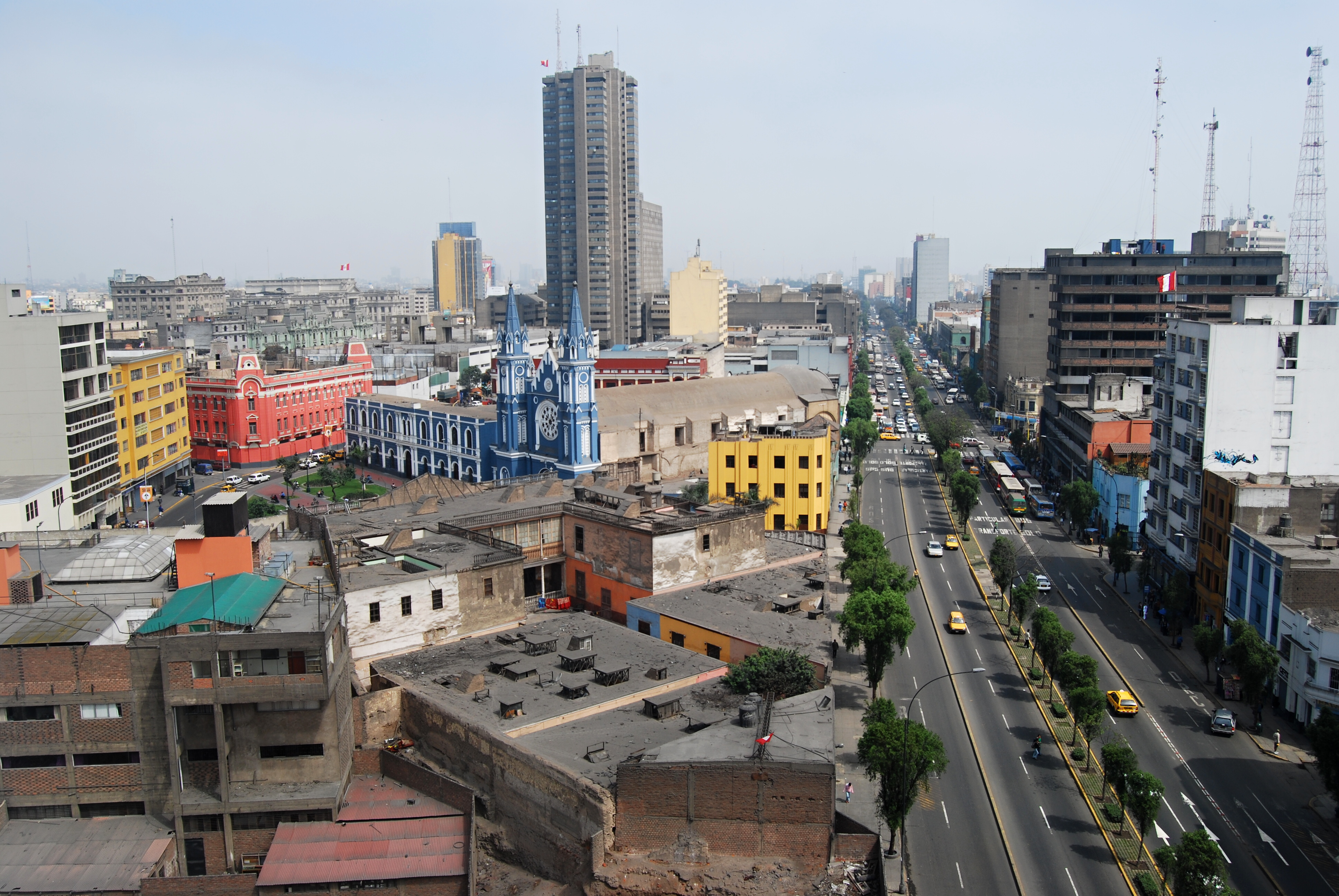
- Namesake: Inca Garcilaso de la Vega
- From: Avenida Nicolás de Piérola
- Major junctions: Avenida España, Avenida 9 de Diciembre
- To: Avenida 28 de Julio

Inca Garcilaso de la Vega Avenue (Spanish: Avenida Inca Garcilaso de la Vega), also known by its old name, Wilson Avenue (Spanish: Avenida Wilson), is an avenue in Lima, Peru.

It is constituted as one of the main access roads to the historic centre of Lima and extends from north to south along 13 blocks. Its route begins on block 7, as it continues the numbering that begins with Tacna Avenue, continuing towards the south to Arequipa Avenue.

== History ==
The avenue was originally called El Sol Avenue (Spanish: Avenida El Sol), a name that was later changed to Wilson in homage to U.S. President Woodrow Wilson. Although during the government of General Juan Velasco Alvarado the name was changed to the more autochthonous Inca Garcilaso de la Vega, in honor of the first mestizo writer in Peru, the name Wilson continues to be used by locals to this day.

Since 2015, it has an underground overpass at the intersection with 28 de Julio Avenue, allowing traffic flow to Arequipa and República de Chile avenues, from which Arenales Avenue originates.

The avenue's 14th and 15th blocks were partially closed for 10 months due to construction works for the Central Station of Line 2 of the Lima and Callao Metro, being reopened completely on June 8, 2025.

== Route ==
In its twelve-block route, the main highlights are its blocks 11, 12 and 13, which constitute the largest cluster of computer items in Lima. The area is the location of many well-known commercial galleries where software and hardware products are sold. There is a belief that this emporium is the largest producer of pirated software in the country, however, journalistic sources indicate that only 16% of the products sold are pirated.

The avenue's intersection with the Avenida España is the location of the former U.S. Embassy, today the Clínica Internacional, and of the Casa Matusita, a house known for the popular belief of being of the paranormal type. The avenue is also the location of the SUNAT Building, located near the former embassy, the Lima Civic Center, located on the 13th block, the Park of the Exhibition, among others.
