= San Miguel District, San Miguel =

Coordinates: 7.0006°S 78.8514°W

San Miguel
- District
- Interactive map of San Miguel
- Country: Peru
- Region: Cajamarca
- Province: San Miguel
- Capital: San Miguel de Pallaques

Government
  - Mayor: Guillermo Espinoza Rodas

Area
  - Total: 368.26 km^{2} (142.19 sq mi)
- Elevation: 2,620 m (8,600 ft)

Population (2005 census)
  - Total: 15,871
  - Density: 43.097/km^{2} (111.62/sq mi)
- Time zone: UTC-5 (PET)
- UBIGEO: 061101

San Miguel District is one of thirteen districts of the province San Miguel in Peru. San Miguel was founded by Francisco Pizarro in 1532 and is thus the oldest European town in Peru.
