= Lima Penitentiary =

Former prison building in Lima, Peru

- Penitenciaría de Lima
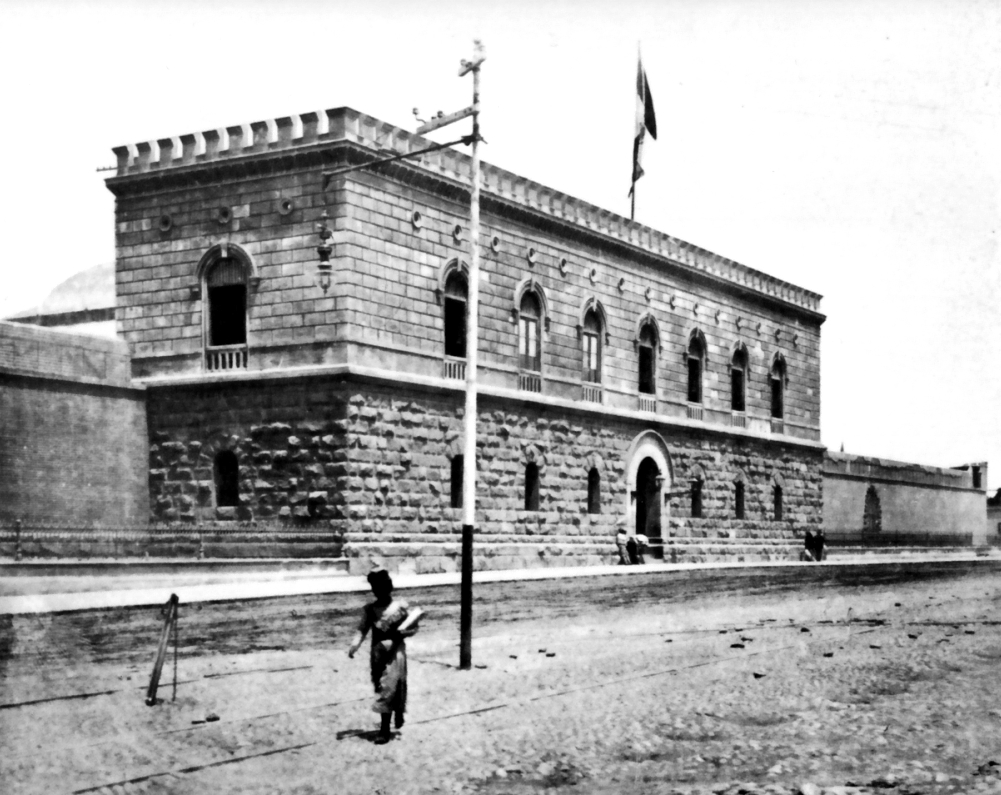
- The building in 1875
- Interactive map of the Lima Penitentiary area

General information
- Status: Demolished
- Location: Lima, Peru
- Construction started: 31 January 1856
- Construction stopped: 1860
- Inaugurated: 23 July 1862
- Closed: June 1961
- Demolished: August 1961
- Owner: Government of Peru

Design and construction
- Architects: Michele Trefogli; Maximiliano Mimey

The Lima Penitentiary (Spanish: Penitenciaría de Lima), also known simply as El Panóptico, was a prison building that existed in Lima, Peru. It had a panopticon layout and was designed by Michele Trefogli and Maximiliano Mimey.

== History ==
The penitentiary was built between 1856 and 1860, by order of President Ramón Castilla due to the lack of a prison system in the country. It was inaugurated in 1862. After a study carried out by Mariano Paz Soldán, the construction of the building was arranged by architects Michele Trefogli and Maximiliano Mimey. It was located south of the city, near the Guadalupe Gate of the Walls of Lima.

The front of the building reflected a severe architectural style, showing its reclusive purpose and trying to project an impregnable image, while the layout of the rooms inside included areas where prisoners worked during the day and cells where they were confined in the nights.

The building existed for more than 100 years and characters such as President Augusto B. Leguía were imprisoned there, confined there after the coup that removed him from power, although he did not die in prison but in the Bellavista Naval Hospital.

There were several workshops in the penitentiary which produced a number of commodities using prison labor. Carpentry, shoemaking, baking, printing, bear law, and bookbinding were among the trades practiced. In 1934, Carlos E. Carrillo Velasquez was the General Administrator in charge of the workshops.

The prison operated until June 1961, later being demolished in August. Before its demolition, all inmates were moved out to El Frontón prison. In its place are currently the Lima Civic Center and the Sheraton Lima Hotel & Convention Center, which were built during the government of Juan Velasco Alvarado.

=== Cristo del Penal ===
During the prison's slow demolition process, an image of Jesus Christ on Mount Golgotha was discovered painted on a wall of a prison cell in June 1964, becoming a point of attraction for local neighbours and other visitors from the city. The image's planned demolition became controversial: despite being supported by the Catholic Church in Peru, it was opposed by the crowds that surrounded the image, and on the date where the demolition was to take place, the crane operator claimed that a strange feeling overcame him and was unable to carry out the act. The image was eventually moved to San Juan de Lurigancho, with the process beginning on September 23, 1964, and forgotten for a period until became the centre of attention again. This time, the Peruvian press was able to locate its author, Rubén Darío Muñiz Calvo, by that point in Iquitos, who stated that he had simply reproduced a stamp gifted to him by the prison's chaplain. The image is reportedly visited by hundreds of devotees in its new location.

== Notable inmates ==
- Augusto B. Leguía, President of Peru
- Ciro Alegría, journalist
- Delfín Lévano, anarchist
- Víctor Raúl Haya de la Torre, politician
- Jorge Villanueva Torres, a man convicted and controversially executed in 1957 for the kidnapping, rape and murder of a young boy.

== See also ==
- Lima Civic Center
- Sheraton Lima Historic Center
