= Julia Ferrer =

Peruvian poet and writer

Julia Ferrer (1925–1995), born in Lima, Peru, was a Peruvian poet and writer. She was fluent in English and French, and spoke some German, Portuguese and Quechua.

Ferrer took courses in theater at the National Institute of Dramatic Art (now ENSAD), and took courses at the School of Fine Arts of Lima.

== Works published ==
- Ferrer, Julia (1958). Imágenes Porque Sí [Images Because]. Lima: Author's edition. OCLC 12129957.
- Ferrer, Julia (1966). La Olvidada Lección de Cosas Olvidadas [The Forgotten Lesson of Forgotten Things]. Lima: Solisol Editions. OCLC 5463432.
- Ferrer, Julia (2004). Gesto [Gesture (Poems 1942-1981)]. Selection and foreword by Renato Gómez and Paul Guillén. Peru: Trpode. OCLC 56620528.
