= Bolívar District, San Miguel =

Coordinates: 6.9752°S 79.1765°W

Bolívar
- District
- Interactive map of Bolívar
- Country: Peru
- Region: Cajamarca
- Province: San Miguel
- Founded: December 26, 1989
- Capital: Bolívar

Government
  - Mayor: Jorge Ramirez Prado

Area
  - Total: 78.97 km^{2} (30.49 sq mi)
- Elevation: 926 m (3,038 ft)

Population (2005 census)
  - Total: 1,636
  - Density: 20.72/km^{2} (53.66/sq mi)
- Time zone: UTC-5 (PET)
- UBIGEO: 061102

Bolívar District is one of thirteen districts of the province San Miguel in Peru.
