= Carlos E. Carrillo Velasquez =

Peruvian educator, prison administrator, and bibliophile

Carlos E. Carrillo Velásquez
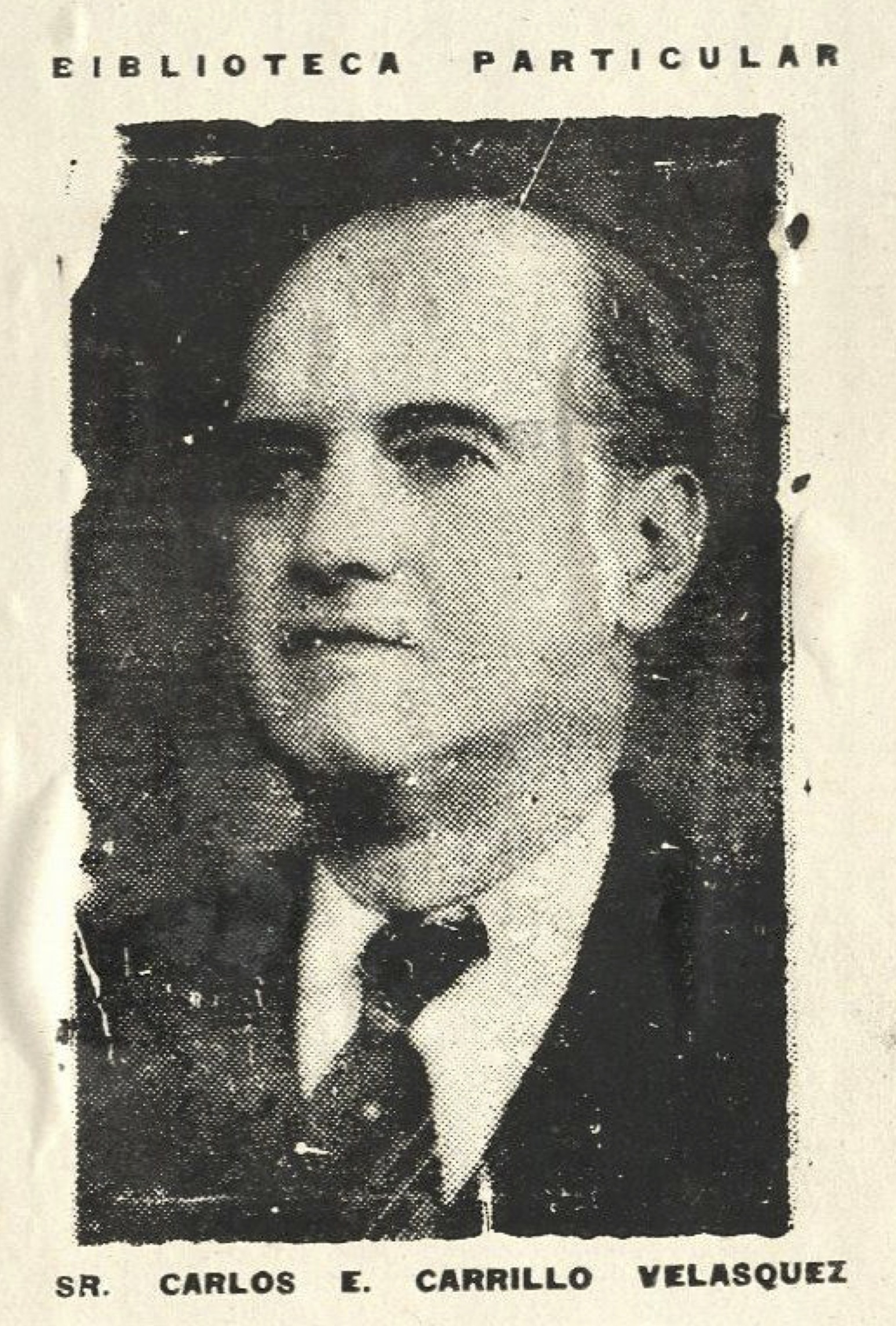
- Portrait of Carrillo Velasquez used on one of his bookplates
- Born: February 6, 1890; Lima, Peru
- Occupation: Administrador General
- Employer: Penitenciaria Central de Lima
- Known for: Prison administrator, book collector
- Spouse: Natalia Angulo Pacheco
- Children: Hortensia, Maria Teresa, Luzmilla
- Parent(s): Edmundo G. Carrillo and Zoila Rosa Velásquez

Carlos E. Carrillo Velasquez (born 1890) was a Peruvian educator, prison administrator, and bibliophile. Carrillo Velasquez amassed one of the largest, most comprehensive book collections on the history of late 19th and early 20th century Peruvian publishing.

== Biography ==
Carrillo Velasquez was born on February 6, 1890, in Lima, Peru. He attended Colegio Santo Tomas de Aquino and Colegio Labarthe. In 1912, he moved to Monsefu, in the Lambayeque Region, as an educator at a state-funded all-boys school. While there, he published El Colegial, a serial produced on his typewriter, the first such writing machine to be brought to the area. Carrillo Velasquez was the director of other schools in the region, such as those in Villa de Eten and Ferreñafe. He was active in social clubs, such as the Rotary Club, and in founding new chapters of the Club de Tiro al Blanco.

In the 1920s, Carrillo Velasquez served as director of various periodicals including Voz del Obrero, participated in the fourth congress of the Pro-Rights Committee of Tahuantinsuyo, and became a member of the Benemérita Sociedad Fundadores de la Independencia. He returned to Lima in the mid-1920s, and developed his interests in print culture. While in Lima, he helped produce a newspaper for north Peru transplants in Lima, El Heraldo de Sechura. Carrillo Velasquez enrolled in the Escuela Penitenciaria de Vigilantes del Peru, and graduated in 1930 as a Superior Employee of Detention, Correctional, and Protection Centers of the Republic (Empleado Superior de Establecimientos de Detencion, Correcion y de Tutela de la Republica).

He was sub-director of the Reformatorio de Menores de Surco from 1929 until 1934, when he became Administrator General of the Penitenciaria Central de Lima and was given charge of the penitentiary's printing and binding workshops.
