= Plaza Francia, Lima =

Cultural heritage site in Peru

Coordinates: 12°03′12″S 77°02′16″W

France Square
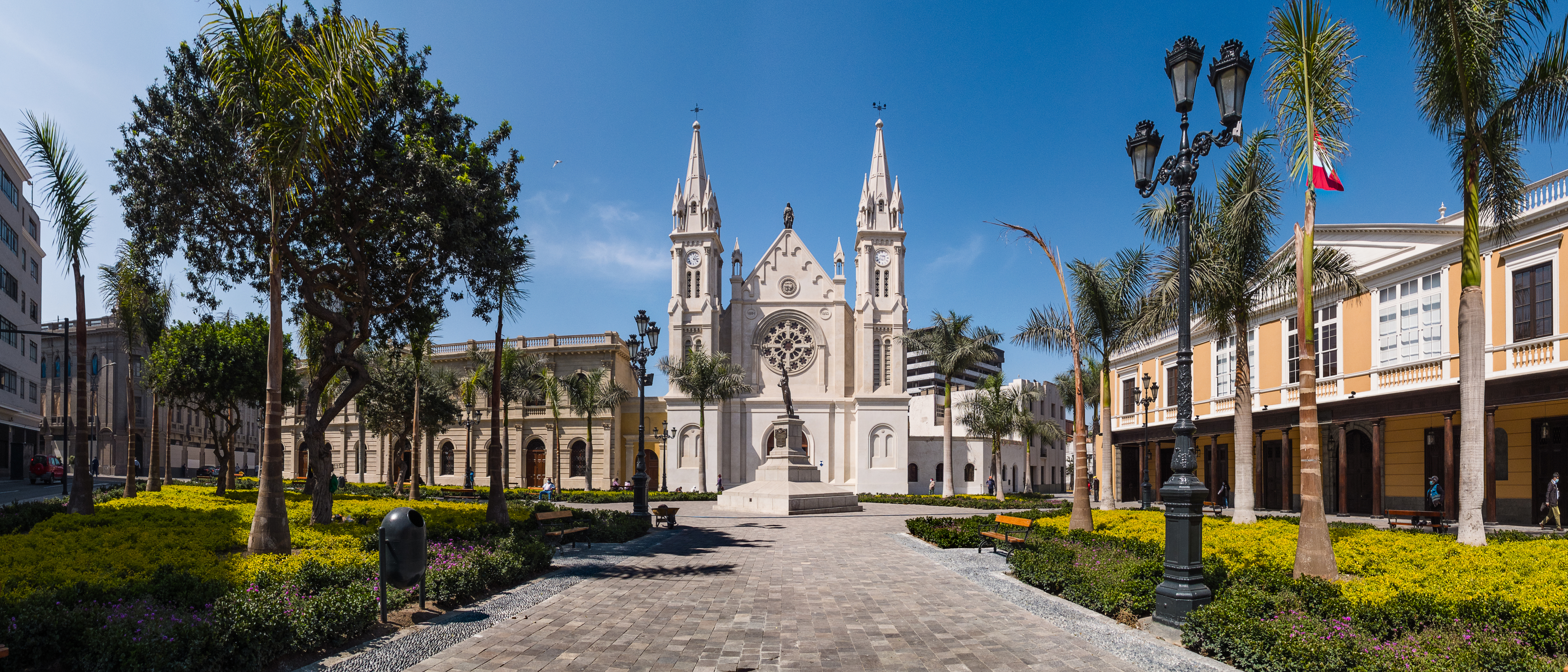

- Location within Lima
- Location: Lima, Peru

UNESCO World Heritage Site
- Official name: Plaza Francia
- Type: Non-movable
- Criteria: Monument
- Designated: 1991
- Part of: Historic Centre of Lima
- Reference no.: 500

The Plaza de Francia, also known by its former name, Plazoleta de la Recoleta, is a public square in the historic centre of Lima, Peru.

== History ==
The square, originally named after the monastery of the Dominican Order built there in 1606, was the site of a pre-Hispanic trail that continued the path of the Camino de los Llanos (later known as the Vía Expresa). In addition to its current church, it also housed another chapel, known as the Capilla de la Virgen de la Leche.

After independence, the Convent of the Venturous Mary Magdalene (Spanish: Convento de la Venturosa María Magdalena) became administered by the Charity of Lima. In 1848, nuns from the Congregation of the Sacred Hearts of Jesus and Mary arrived to Peru and established themselves on the convent. In 1881, the church burnt down, and, after the War of the Pacific, it was rebuilt under a different name, with two schools that would be run by the congregation also being built. The Pontifical Catholic University of Peru was later inaugurated there.

A hospice also operated on the plaza, founded by Bartolomé Manrique. He was stabbed to death in 1866, in the Ánimas de San Agustín street.

The square received its current name after the French colony in Lima donated a statue to commemorate the Centennial of the Independence of Peru.

== Landmarks ==
- The Statue of Liberty, donated by the French colony
- The former French embassy
- The Josefina Ramos de Cox Archaeological Museum
- The Pinacotheca of Lima, inaugurated in 1925
- The Church of the Sacred Hearts of Jesus and Mary, originally built in 1606.
