= Tongod District, Peru =

Coordinates: 6.7567°S 78.8245°W

Tongod
- District
- Interactive map of Tongod
- Country: Peru
- Region: Cajamarca
- Province: San Miguel
- Founded: June 14, 1989
- Capital: Tongod

Government
  - Mayor: Julio Anibal Vargas Gavidia

Area
  - Total: 163.89 km^{2} (63.28 sq mi)
- Elevation: 2,645 m (8,678 ft)

Population (2005 census)
  - Total: 3,317
  - Density: 20.24/km^{2} (52.42/sq mi)
- Time zone: UTC-5 (PET)
- UBIGEO: 061112

Tongod District is one of thirteen districts of the province San Miguel in Peru.
