= Sheraton Lima Historic Center =

Hotel in Lima, Peru

Coordinates: 12.0574°S 77.037°W

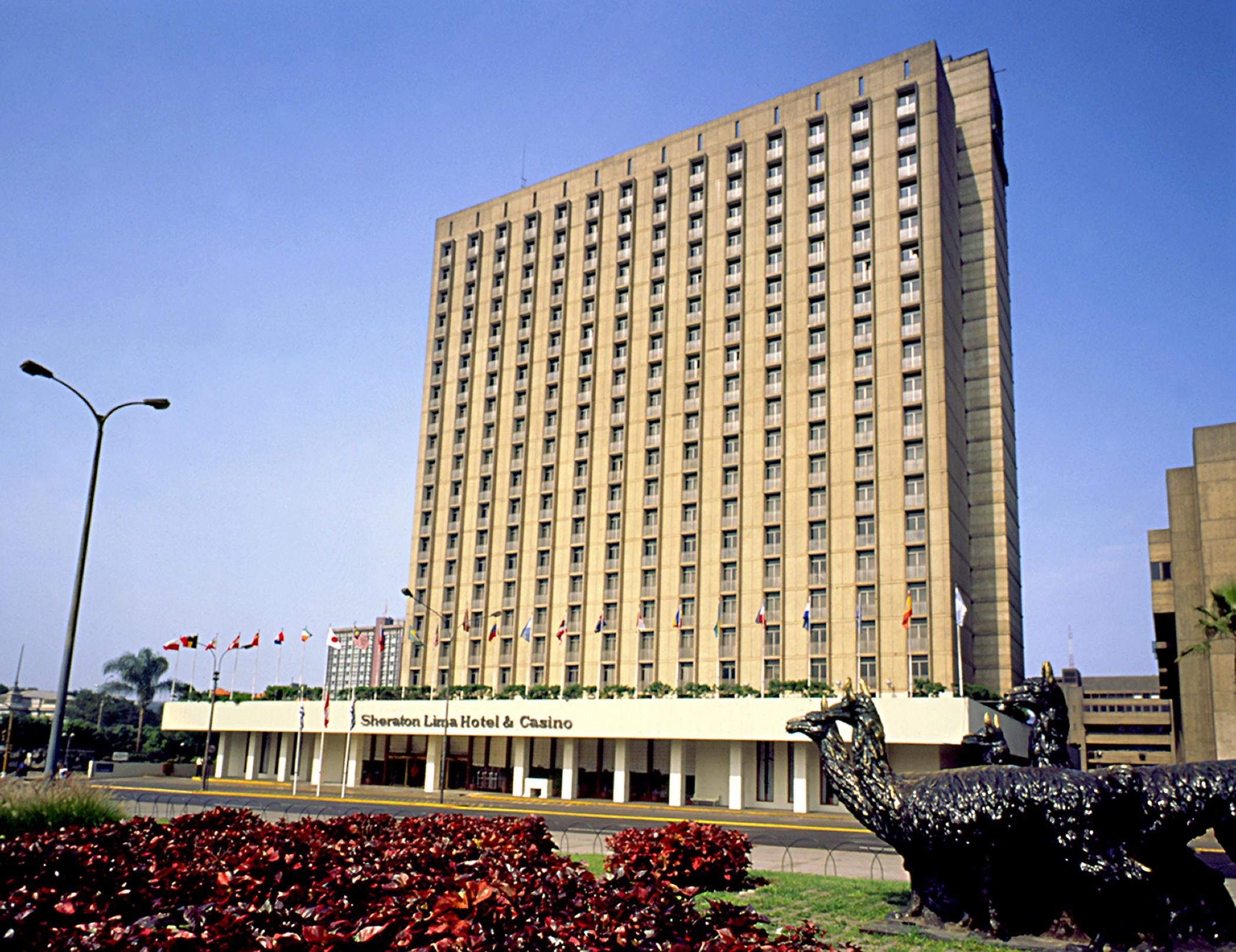
- The building in 2013
- Interactive map of the Sheraton Lima Historic Center area
- Alternative names: Sheraton Lima Hotel & Convention Center

General information
- Architectural style: Brutalist
- Location: Historic Centre of Lima, 170 Luis Bedoya Reyes Ave.
- Inaugurated: 1 March 1973
- Owner: Sheraton Hotels and Resorts

Technical details
- Floor count: 20

Design and construction
- Architect: Ricardo Jaxa-Malachowski Benavides

Other information
- Number of rooms: 431

The Sheraton Lima Historic Center, known as the Sheraton Lima Hotel & Convention Center until 2022, is a luxury hotel located in the historic centre of Lima, Peru. The hotel is part of the Lima Civic Center, which includes a multi-purpose building and a shopping mall, which was itself built above the grounds of the former Lima Penitentiary.

== History ==
American hotel chain Sheraton Hotels and Resorts arrived in Peru at the end of the 1960s, and began construction of its hotel on the south side of the Lima Civic Center where the Lima Penitentiary was formerly located. The building where it was built formed, together with the Torre de Lima of the Civic Centre, a classic view of the predominant Lima skyline during the 1970s.

The hotel opened its doors on 1 March 1973, as the Sheraton Lima Hotel. Despite rumours of ghosts of the former prison haunting the place, the hotel opened without incident. In its early years, it housed people such as Venezuelan actress Lupita Ferrer and singer José Luis Rodríguez, Cuban singer Celia Cruz and Spanish singer Miguel Bosé.

Being located in the Paseo de los Héroes Navales, the hotel has had an active participation in the political life of Peru, serving as a dais for the political rallies that have been held in said plaza. During the events of 5 February 1975, known as the Limazo, the hotel, as well as the neighbouring Lima Tower of the Civic Centre, were damaged by a fire amid riots in their immediate surroundings. In the year 2000 the stage was raised during the Four Quarters March.

On August 19, 1990, José Leandro Reaño Cabrejos, an employee of the Banco de Comercio threw the lifeless body of his lover, Marita Soledad Alpaca Raa, from his room's window at the hotel's nineteenth floor after a heated argument. Reaño immediately fled to Rio de Janeiro following the murder, having paid local policemen to tamper with the investigation, but returned and in 1995 was sentenced to seven years in prison, released in 1998 after paying S/. 120,000.

On 30 May 2016, Natalie Paola Rikeros, a 17-year-old Venezuelan girl travelling with a Hare Krishna group, committed suicide by jumping from the hotel's rooftop after sneaking into the building's stairwell. The girl was erroneously identified by local police as a Christian Colombian girl under the name Paola Dominice Pérez, and the information was spread by early reports. The event drew a crowd on the street below, and was caught on film by bystanders.

In August 2022, the hotel officially changed its name to Sheraton Lima Historic Center to "strengthen its ties" with the historic centre of Lima.

== See also ==
- Historic Centre of Lima
- Lima Civic Center
