= Lima Civic Center =

Building in Lima, Peru

Coordinates: 12.0562°S 77.0371°W

- Centro Cívico de Lima
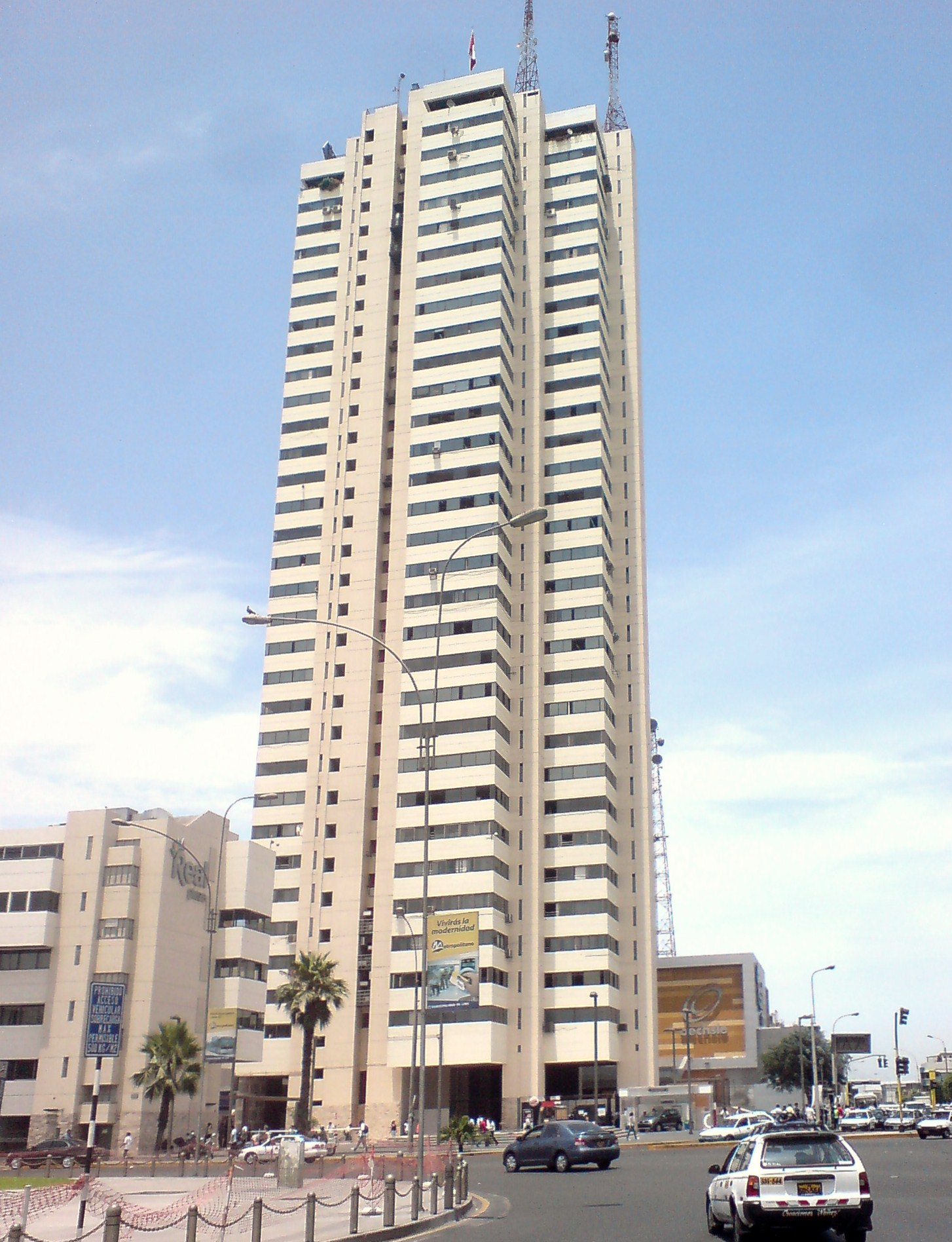
- The Torre de Lima in 2011
- Interactive map of the Lima Civic Center area

General information
- Architectural style: Brutalism
- Location: Historic Centre of Lima
- Construction started: 1970
- Construction stopped: 1977
- Owner: Peruvian State

Height
- Height: 109 metres

Technical details
- Floor count: 33
- Lifts/elevators: 2

Design and construction
- Architects: See list: Adolfo Córdova; Jacques Crousse; José García; Miguel Llona; Guillermo Málaga; Oswaldo Núñez; Simón Ortiz; Jorge Páez; Ricardo Pérez León; Carlos Williams

The Lima Civic Center (Spanish: Centro Cívico de Lima) is an architectural complex located next to the Paseo de los Héroes Navales in the district of Lima, on the land previously occupied by the Lima Penitentiary. It was projected with the intention of becoming a civic-urban landmark for the city, housing State offices, a hotel and a convention center. Its construction began in 1970 and culminated in 1977 with the inauguration of the main tower of the complex. At 109 meters tall, it was the tallest building in the country for 34 years. It was surpassed in 2011 by the Westin Hotel in the San Isidro district.

== History ==
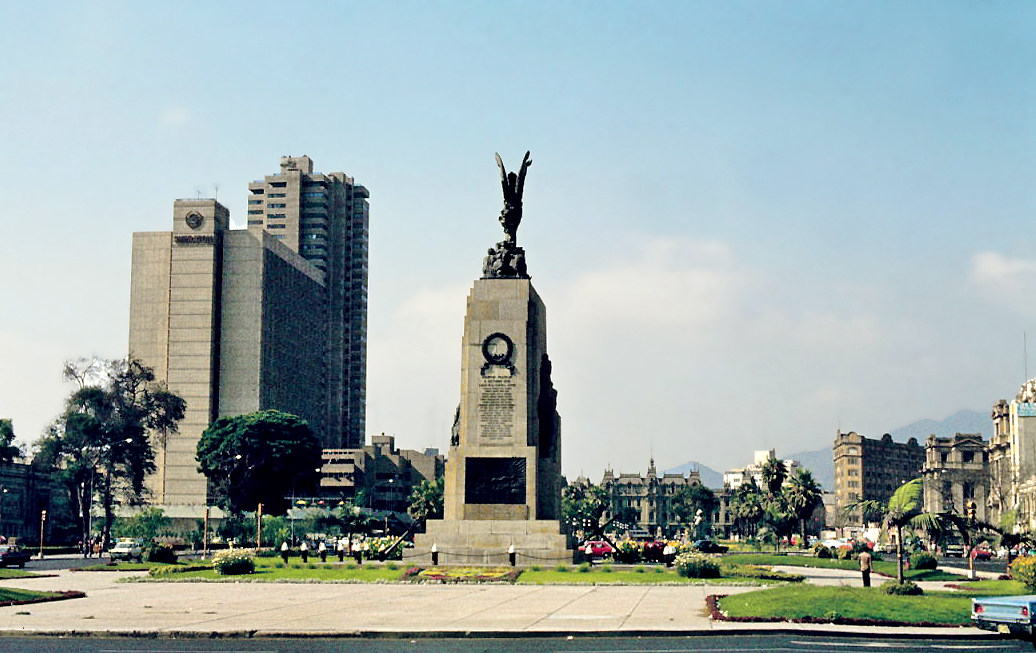
The building's surroundings (1980).

The Civic Center was an original idea of the first government of the architect Fernando Belaúnde Terry, conceived in 1966. Later, after the coup d'état by the military government of Juan Velasco Alvarado, construction was carried out. Initially it came to house a large number of offices and state dependencies, becoming an important center of activity in the city. However, after the events of February 5, 1975, known as the Limazo, the facilities suffered great damage, when part of it caught fire and was destroyed.

It was the last emblematic work erected in the historic centre of Lima before the arrival of the nineties. In mid-2008, a total remodeling of the complex was carried out, to be reopened as a shopping center. The brutalist finish of the Civic Center buildings disappeared with the remodeling, when the walls were painted and covered with synthetic finishes.

On August 27, 2007, Peruvian company Urbi Propiedades, the real estate arm of the Interbank Group, won the thirty-year concession for the Civic Center. This began the construction of the Real Plaza Centro Cívico Shopping Center, which houses a large number of retail stores, a supermarket, bank agencies, a food court, movie theaters, and a mechanical playground for children, among other services. The investment was 30 million dollars. It has a direct connection with the Central Station of the Metropolitan bus system.

== Architecture ==
The architectural style is Brutalist, a current in vogue in Peruvian architecture of that time, which gives the impression of rigidity and firmness to the complex. The main building of the Civic Center of Lima has 33 floors and is 109 meters high. The project also included a hotel tower, the Sheraton Lima Historic Center, which was inaugurated in 1973.

== See also ==
- Historic Centre of Lima
