= Avenida Nicolás de Piérola =

Avenue in Lima, Peru

- Avenida La Colmena
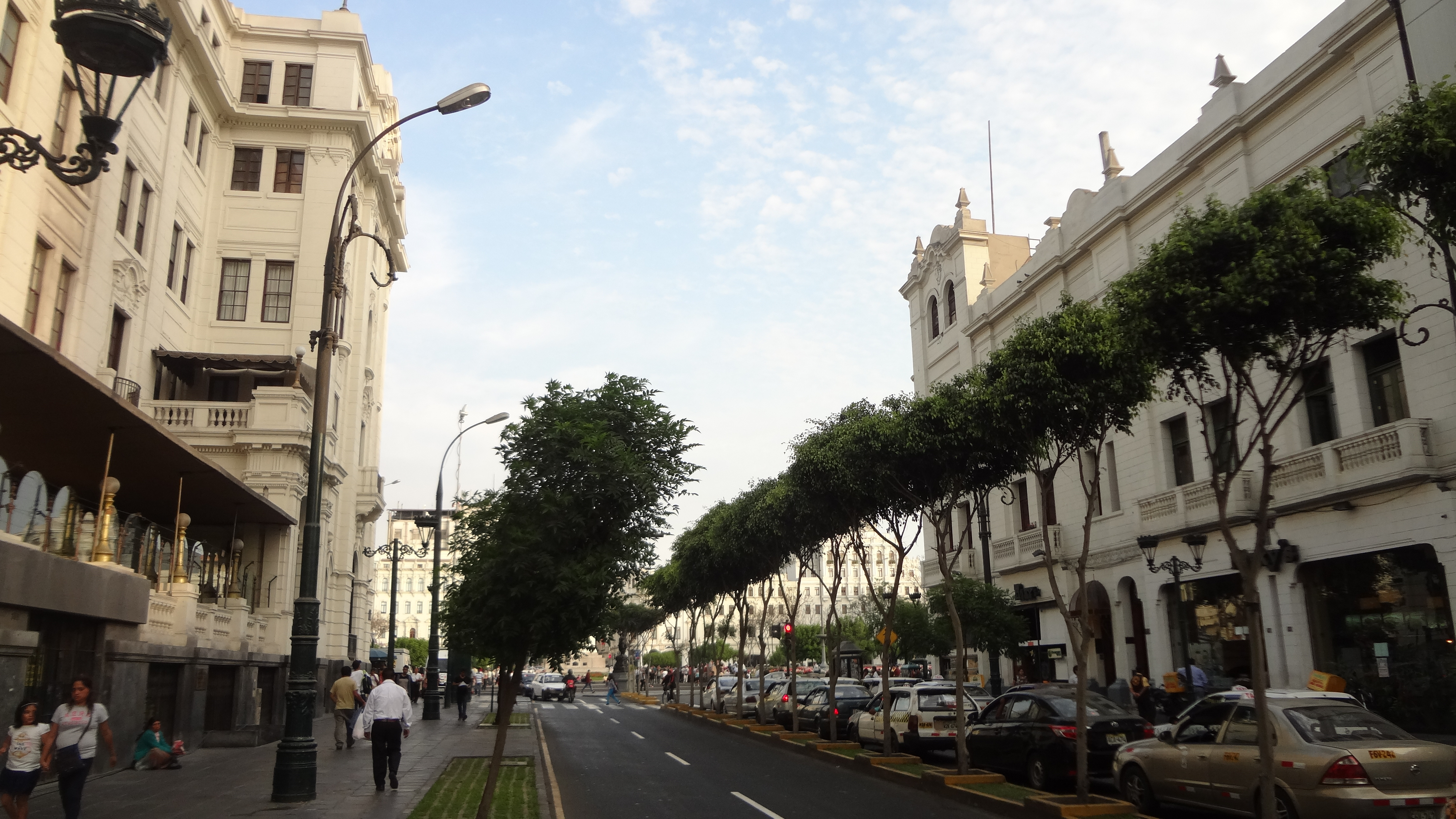
- Interactive map of Avenida Nicolás de Piérola
- Part of: Damero de Pizarro
- Namesake: Nicolás de Piérola
- From: Plaza Dos de Mayo
- Major junctions: Streets: Jirón Angaraes; Jirón Cañete; Pasaje Peñaloza; Jirón Chancay; Jirón Inclán; Jirón Rufino Torrico; Jirón Caylloma; Jirón Camaná; Jirón de la Unión; Jirón Carabaya; Jirón Contumazá; Jirón Lampa; Jirón Azángaro; Jirón Inambari; Jirón Ayacucho; Jirón Andahuaylas; Jirón Montevideo; Jirón Paruro; Avenues: Avenida Tacna; Avenida Wilson; Avenida Abancay
- To: Miguel Grau Avenue

Construction
- Inauguration: 1900

Nicolás de Pierola Avenue (Spanish: Avenida Nicolás de Piérola), also known as La Colmena Avenue (Spanish: Avenida La Colmena), is a major avenue in the Historic Centre of Lima, Peru. It functions as the southern limit of the historic quarter's Damero de Pizarro. It starts at Dos de Mayo Square, continuing for seventeen blocks until it reaches Miguel Grau Avenue.

== Name ==
The avenue is named after Nicolás de Piérola, the two-time president of Peru (1879–1881, 1895–1899) who inaugurated the avenue. It is also known as La Colmena (also simply Colmena) after the construction company of the same name in charge of its construction, with the avenue having been planned as the Avenida Interior de Lima (or simply Avenida Interior). De Piérola later served as the company's manager-director.

The avenue is divided into two parts by San Martín Square. Its western part is known as the Colmena Izquierda, while its eastern part is known as the Colmena Derecha.

== History ==
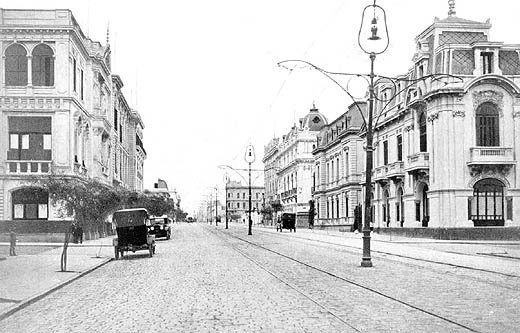
Fourth block, c. 1920.

The avenue was planned under the name of Avenida Interior as a road to modernise the (formerly walled) city's road system, until then developed in a grid pattern. The Urbanizadora La Colmena—a construction company owned by then president Nicolás de Piérola and based in a building in Mercy Square—was in charge of its development.

The incomplete avenue was inaugurated in 1898 by President De Piérola. The city block that would become San Martín Square was demolished in 1917 to make way for the public square designed by architect Manuel Piqueras Cotolí, which was eventually inaugurated in 1921 as part of the centennial celebrations taking place that year.

Construction of the avenue's section from San Martín Square towards Abancay Avenue started in 1919, and the avenue as a whole was only finished during the 1940s. The avenue took an aristocratic, upper-class character, although this was lost during the 1980s due to the centre's deterioration due to the economic crisis at the time. This led to growing crime and prostitution taking place in the avenue.

Restoration works by the Metropolitan Municipality of Lima began in 2015. Since then, restoration works targeting the avenue's buildings have taken place, being undertaken by private real estate companies.

== Route ==
The avenue reunites a large number of Art Nouveau-style buildings. Its first block is partially occupied by the residential buildings constructed as part of the broader Dos de Mayo project. They date back to 1924, having been designed by Claude Sahut and subsequently modified by Ricardo de Jaxa Malachowski. Their concept and construction efforts were the work of Víctor Larco Herrera. One of the buildings functions as the headquarters of the CGTP. The avenue's second block reunites some of the earliest built buildings. One of them, the Casa Gonzales de Panizo, is located at the avenue's intersection with Cañete Street. The French-inspired building was designed by Claude Sahut, and functions as a children's therapy institute as of 2025.

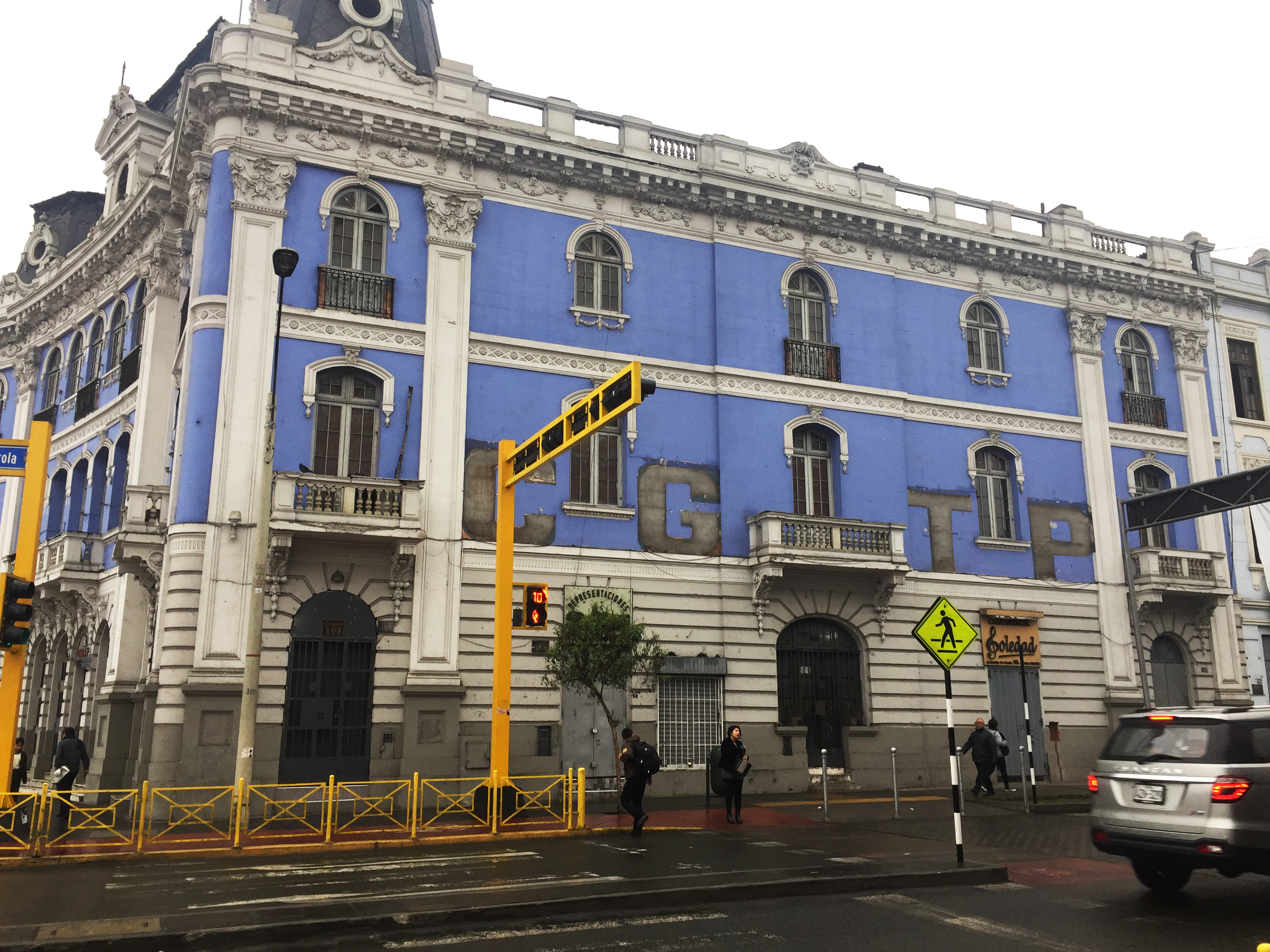
CGTP headquarters

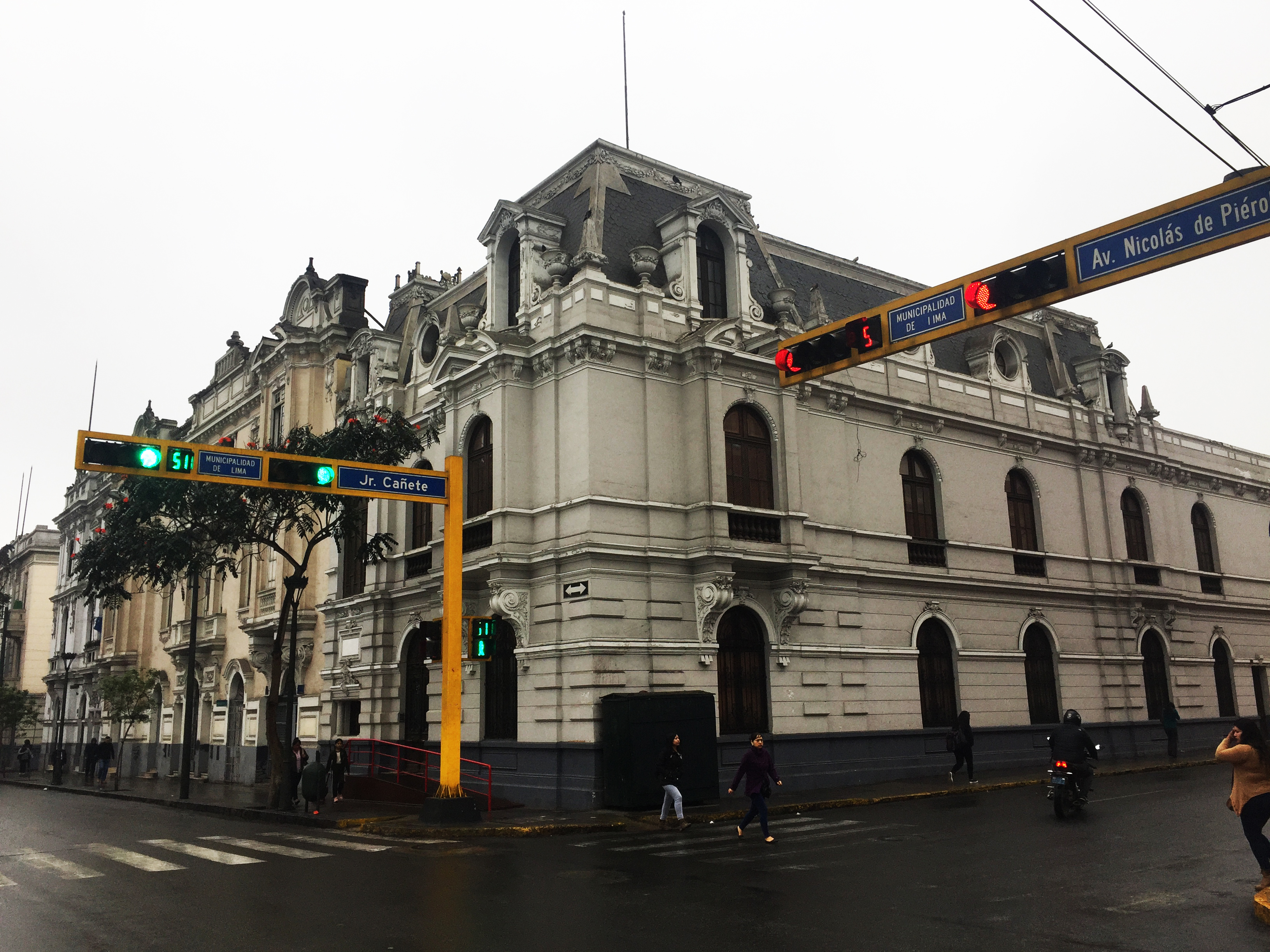
Casa Gonzales de Panizo

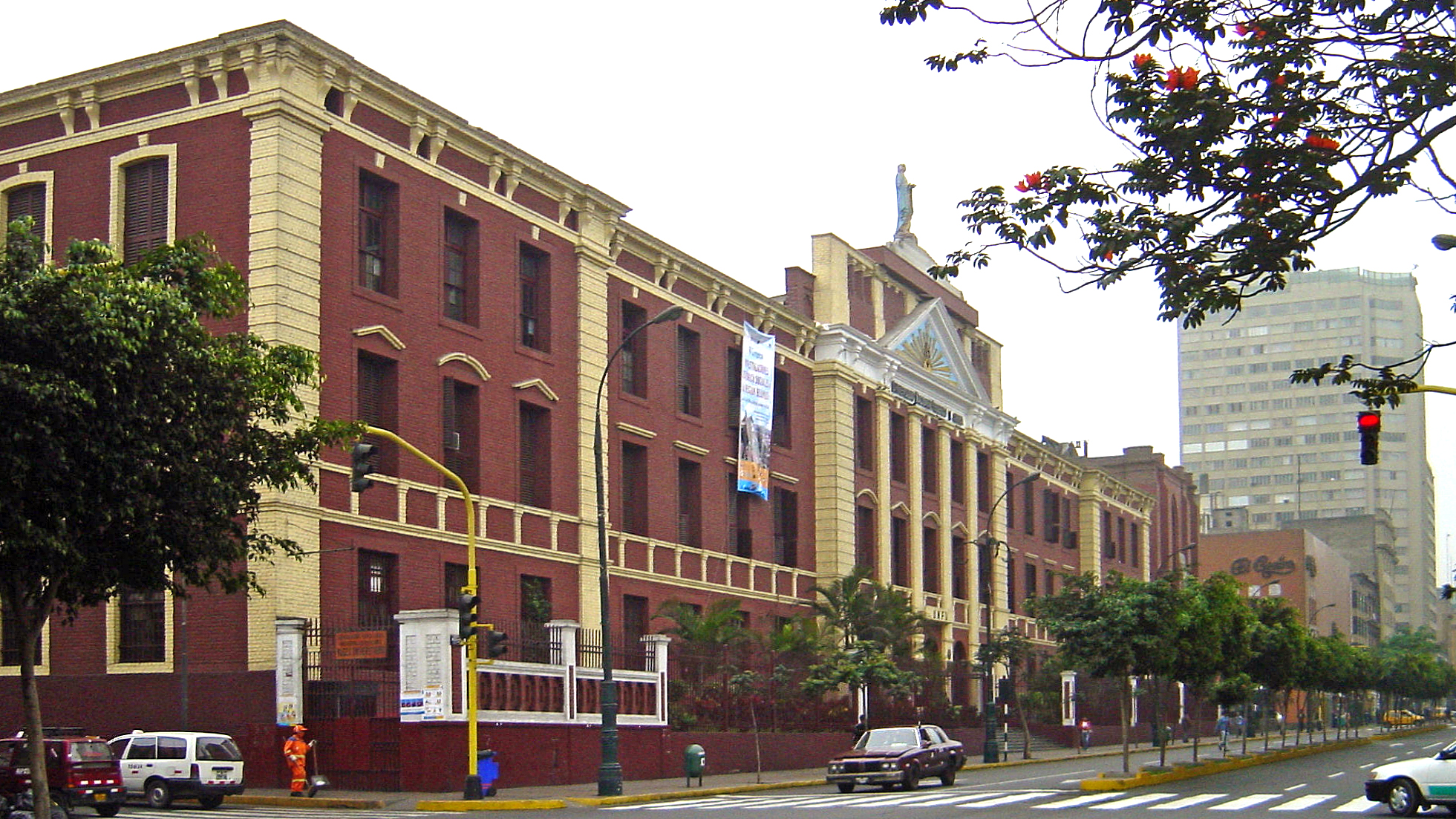
Campus of the UNFV

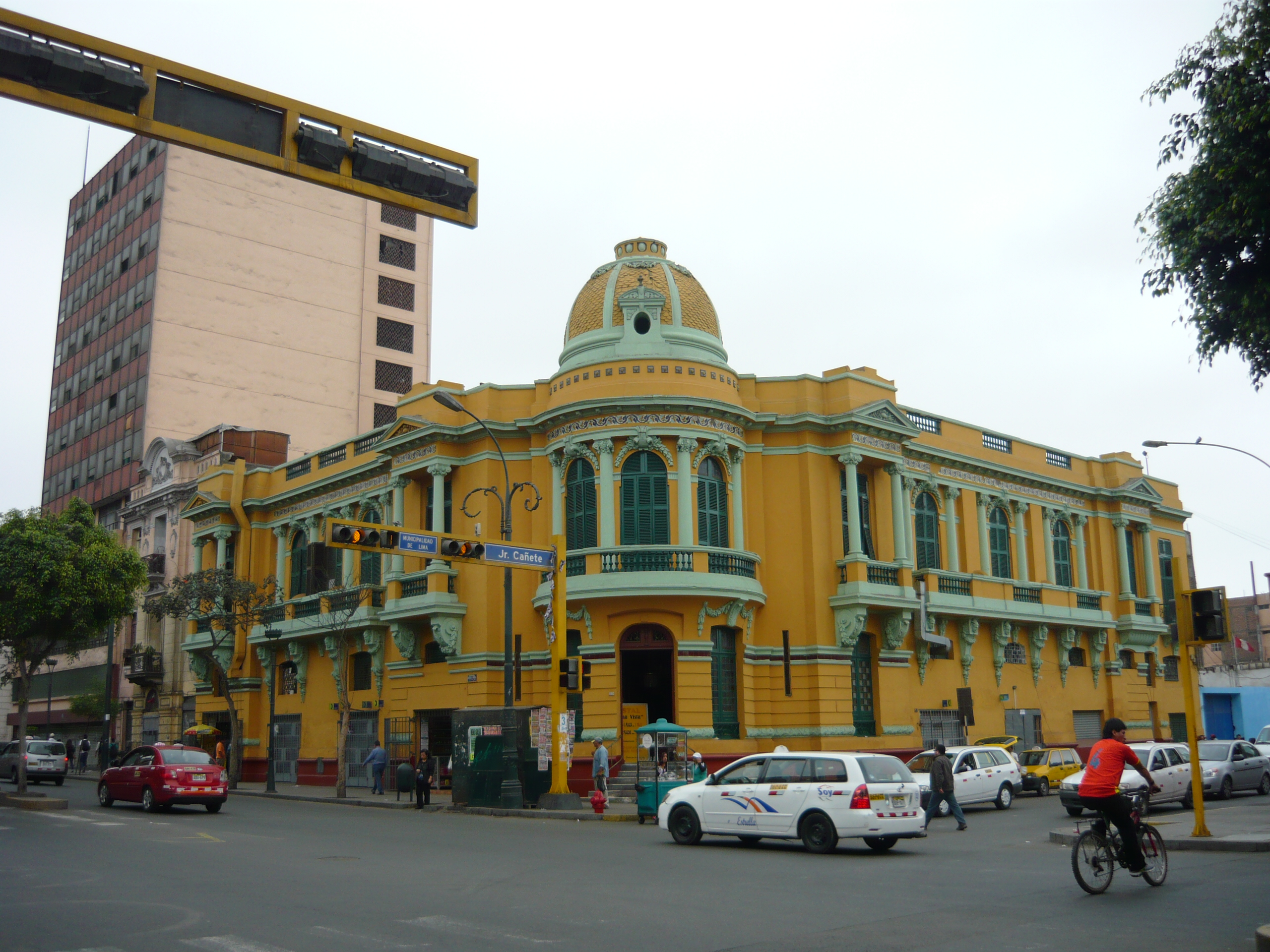
Casa Dibós

The avenue's third block is completely occupied on one side by the former building and chapel of the Colegio de la Inmaculada, a Jesuit school that moved to Santiago de Surco in 1967. The building has since been occupied by Federico Villarreal National University (UNFV). Opposite the university is the Casa Dibós (also known as the Casa Victoria Larco de García), a French-inspired building also designed by Sahut and built in 1908. Its owners were Eduardo Dibos Pflucker and his wife Guillermina Dammert Alarco, the daughter of Juana Alarco de Dammert. It was also one of the first to be built in the new avenue.

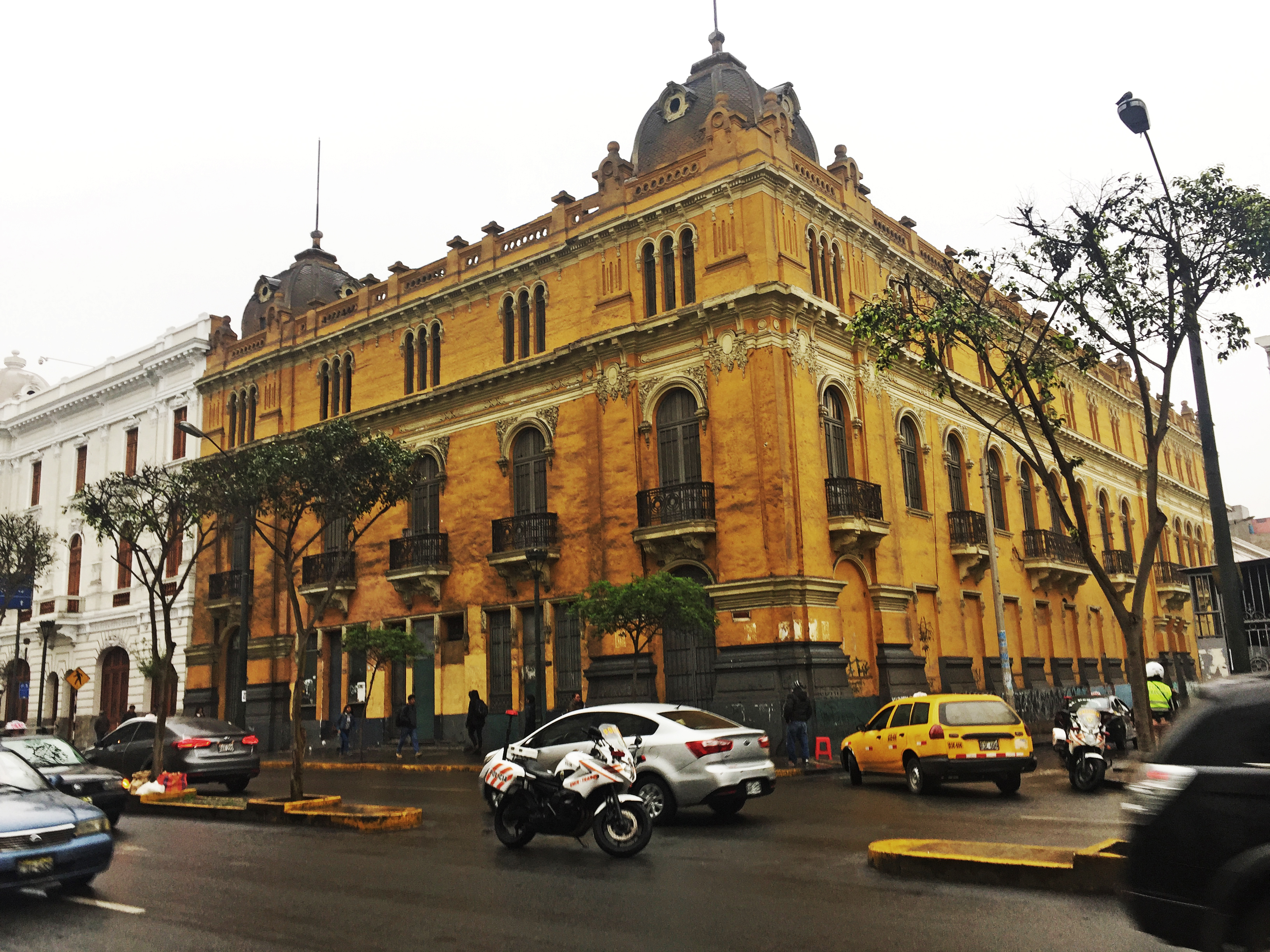
Casa Malachowski

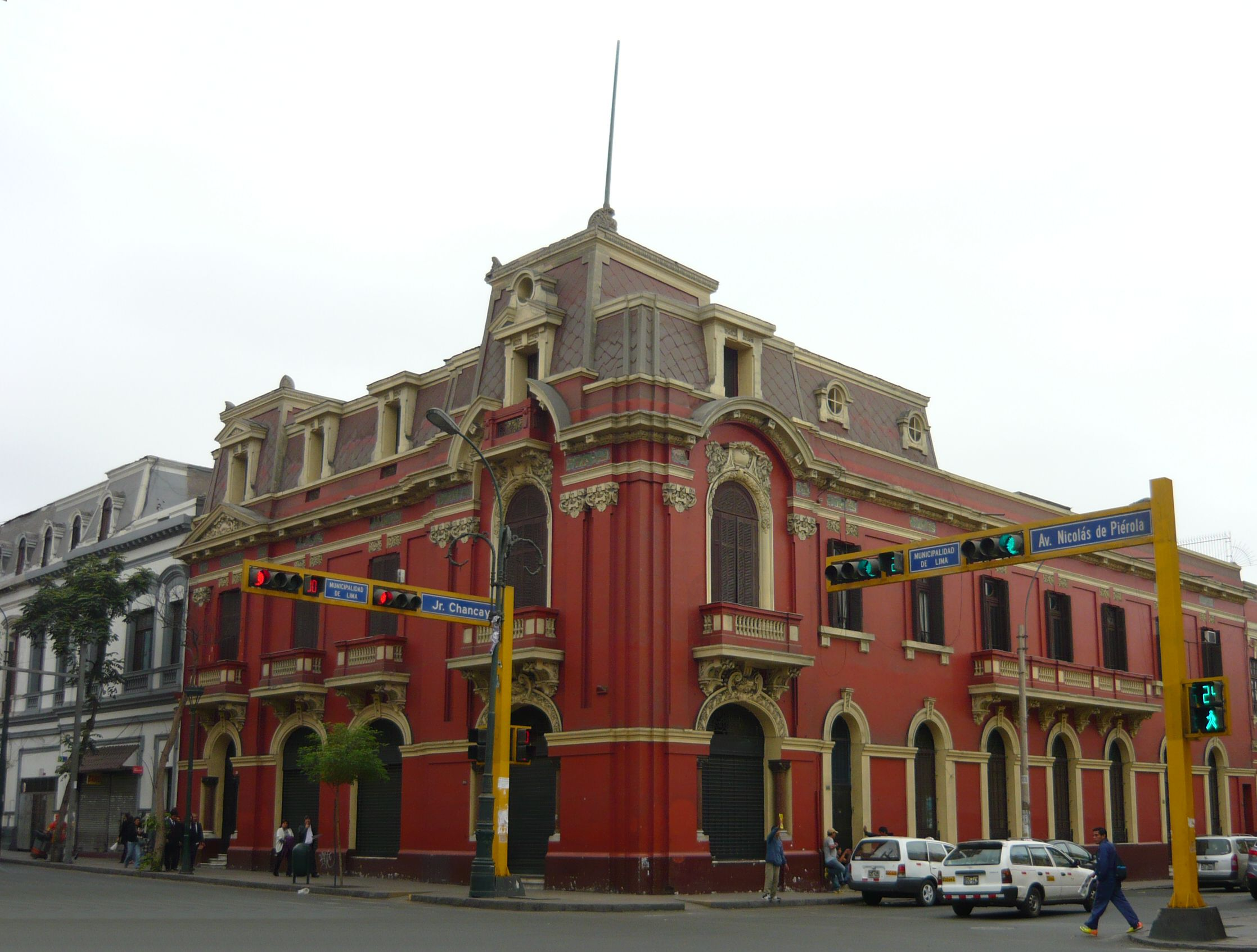
Casa García y Lastres

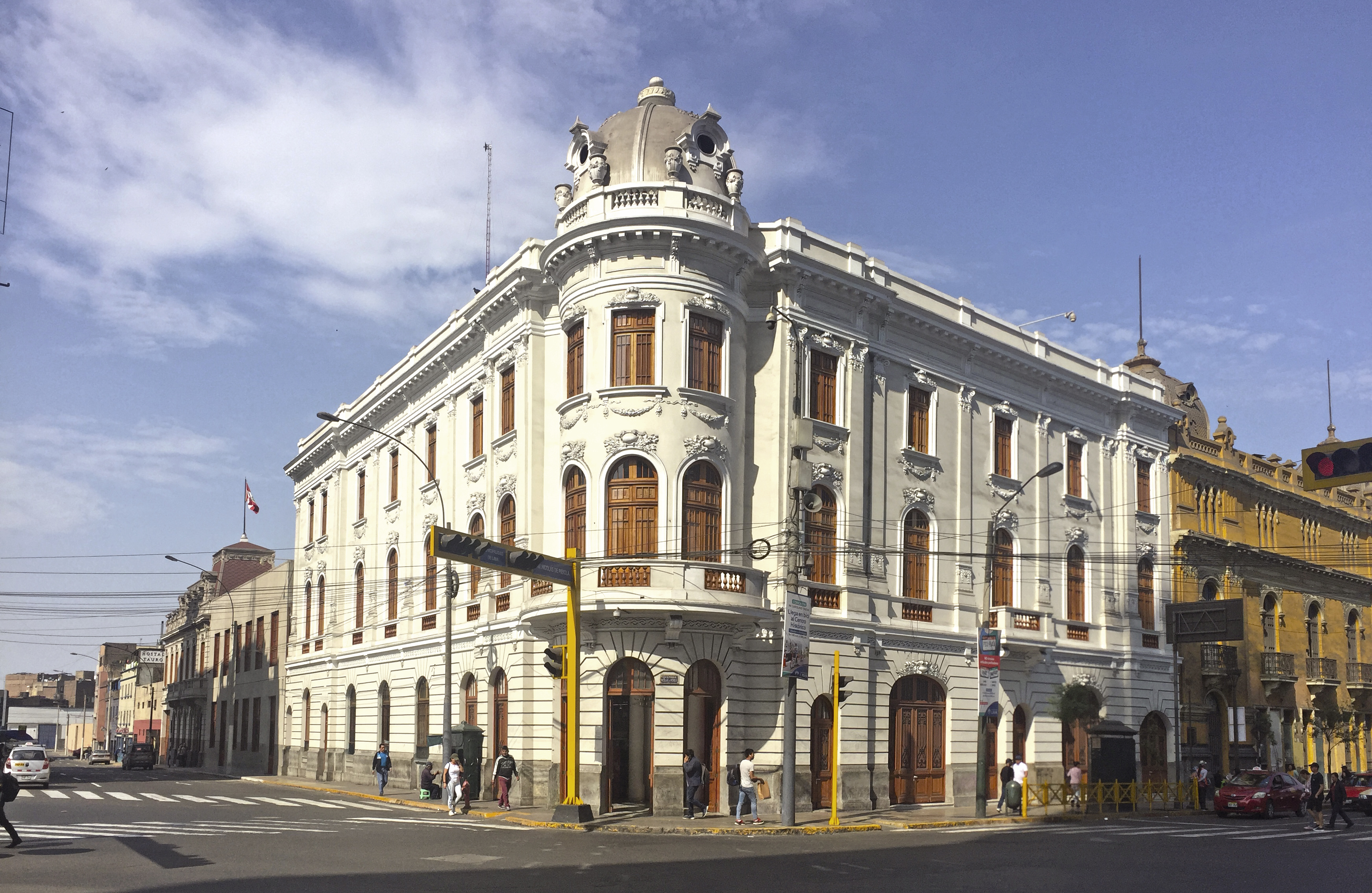
Casa Ostolaza

The avenue's fourth block includes buildings like the Casa García y Lastres, built in 1915, named after its owner and designed by Claude Sahut; the Casa Malachowski, a building was designed by Ricardo de Jaxa Malachowski and built in 1914, later purchased in 2013 by real estate company Arte Express, who named after its architect; and the Casa Ostolaza, built in the early 20th century for the Porvenir insurance company. It was purchased in 2013 by Arte Express and annexed to two other homes and a terrain, being thus renamed the Edificio Popular y Porvenir. It currently houses a supermarket. This block intersects with Tacna Avenue, which changes its name to Inca Garcilaso de la Vega.

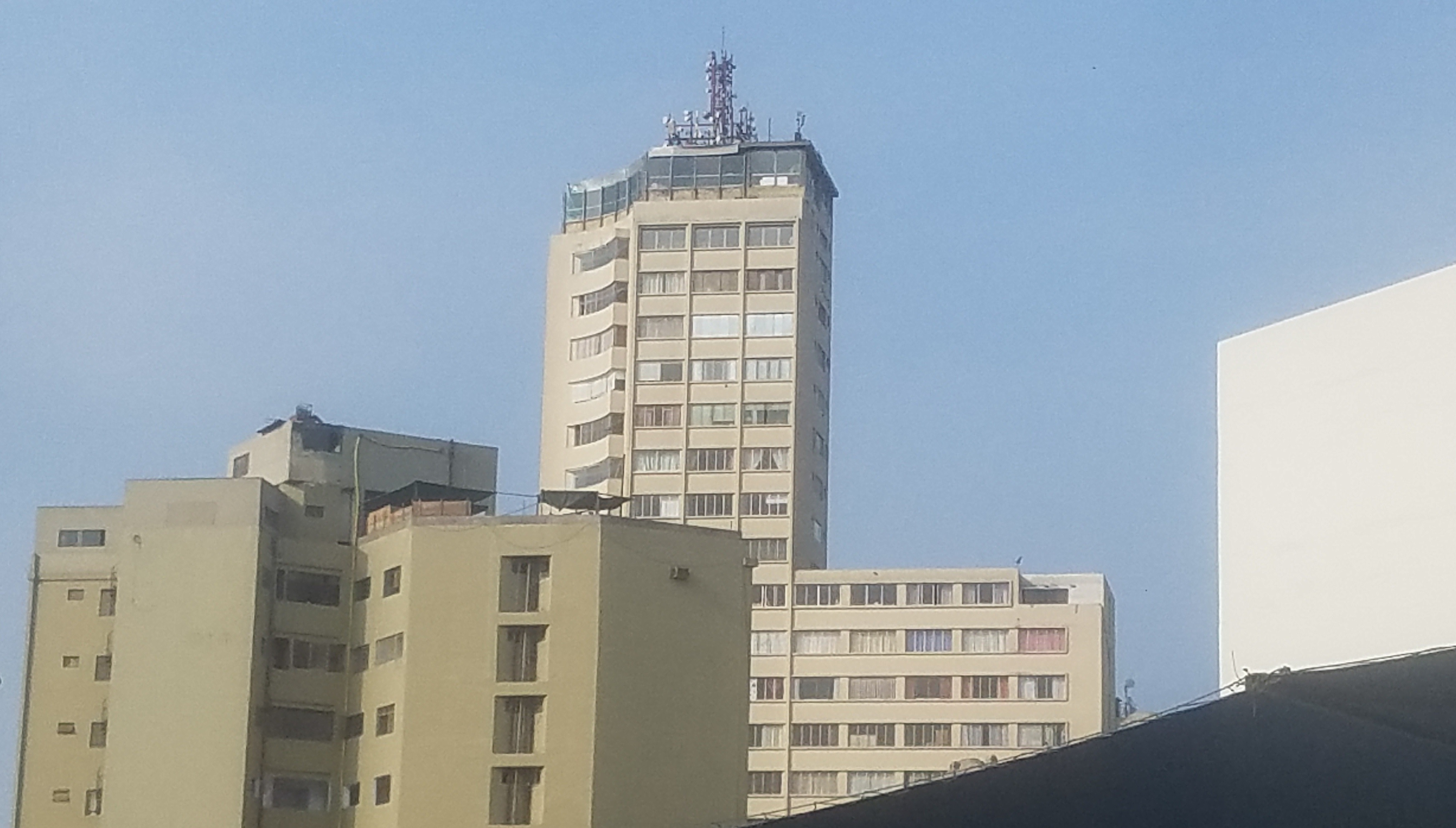
Edificio Tacna-Colmena

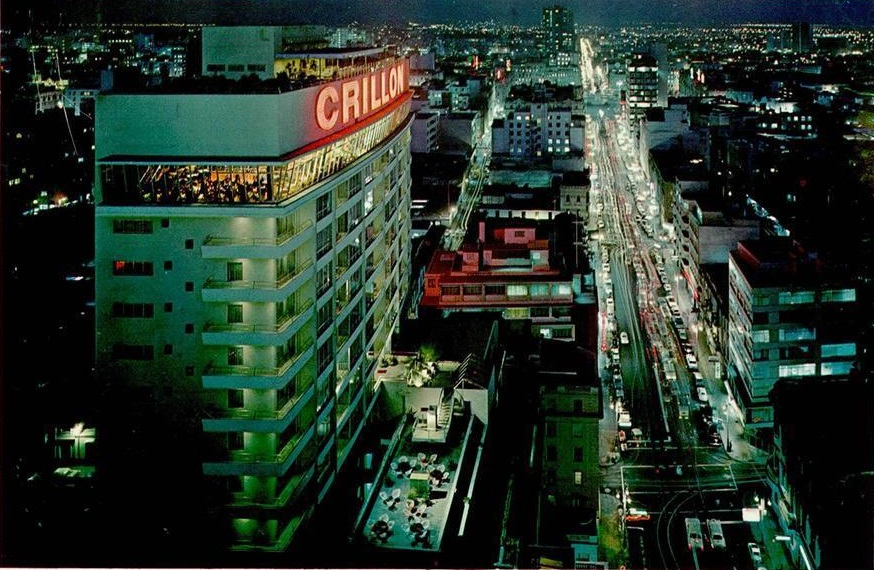
The Hotel Crillón

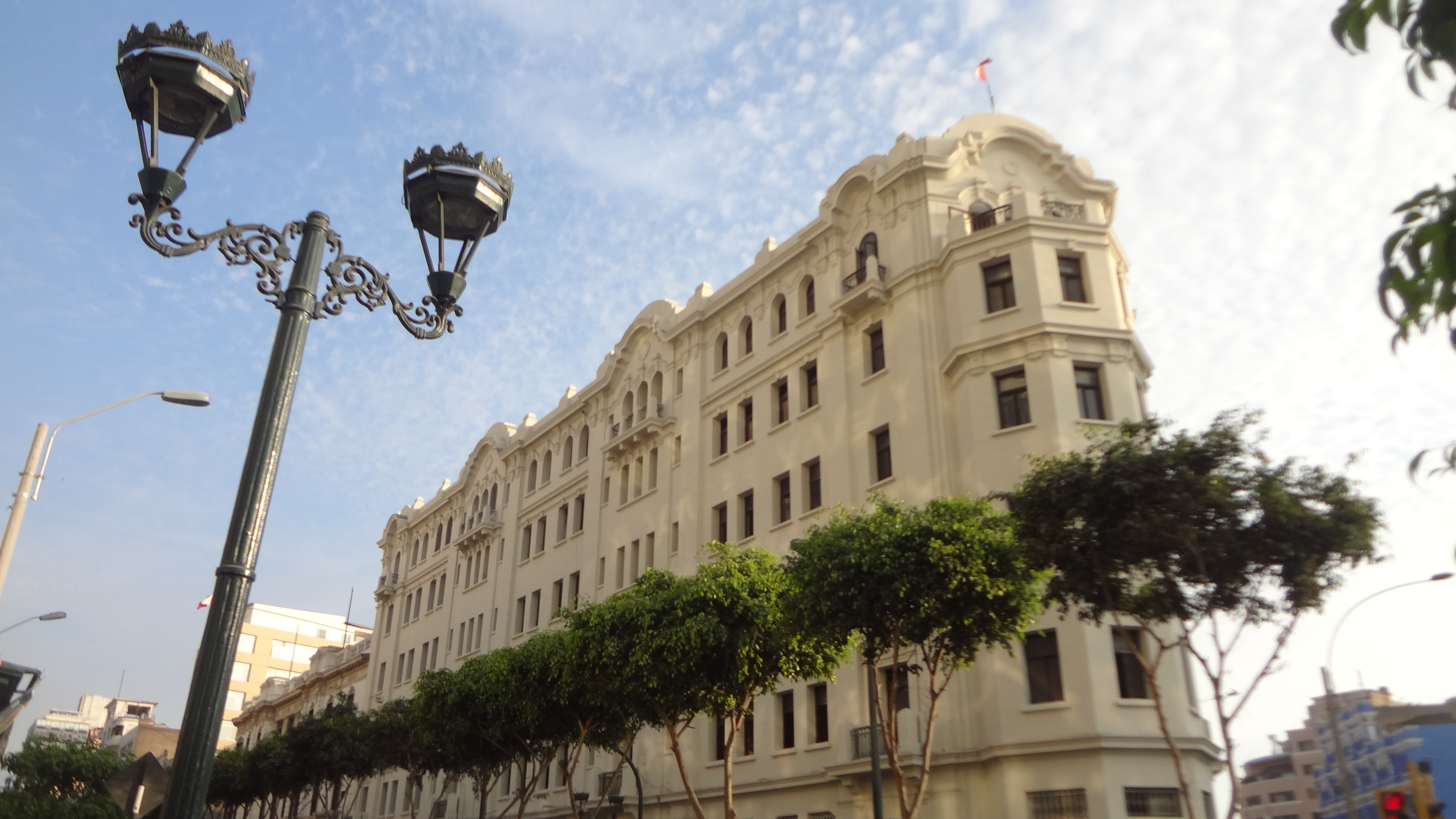
Edificio Rizo Patrón

The avenue's fifth block is crowned by the Edificio Tacna-Colmena, a 23-storey building constructed from 1959 to 1960 and the second tallest of its time. Next to it is the building complex of the former Hotel Crillón, at one point one of the city's most emblematic hotels. Following its closure, it was adapted by real estate company Arte Express—who also redeveloped the building between the hotel and the aforementioned building while maintaining the original façade—into offices used by SUNAT, a government agency. The Rizo Patrón Building, designed by architect Enrique Seoane Ros and inaugurated during the late 1940s, is located at the block's southwestern corner.

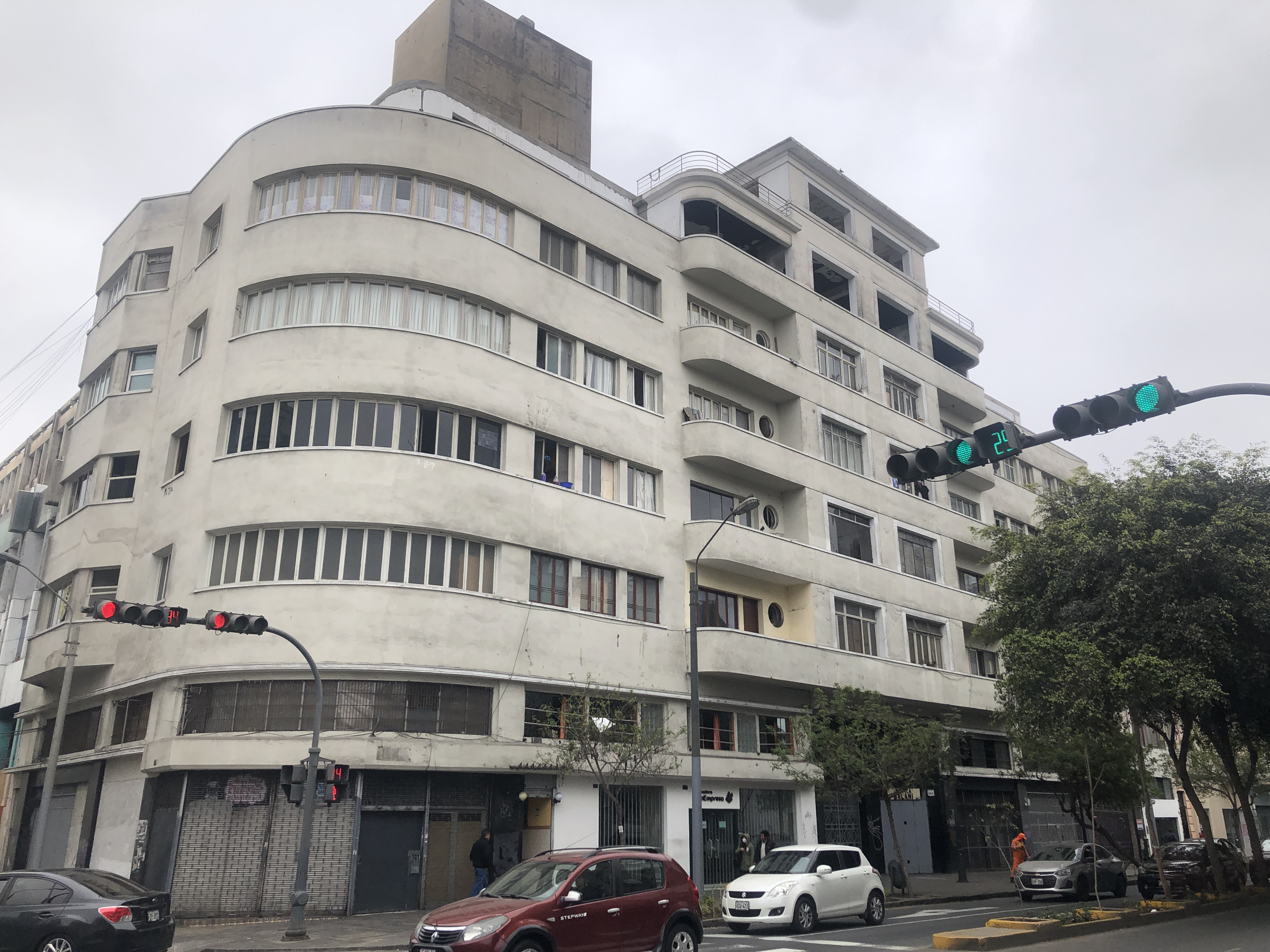
Edificio Raffo

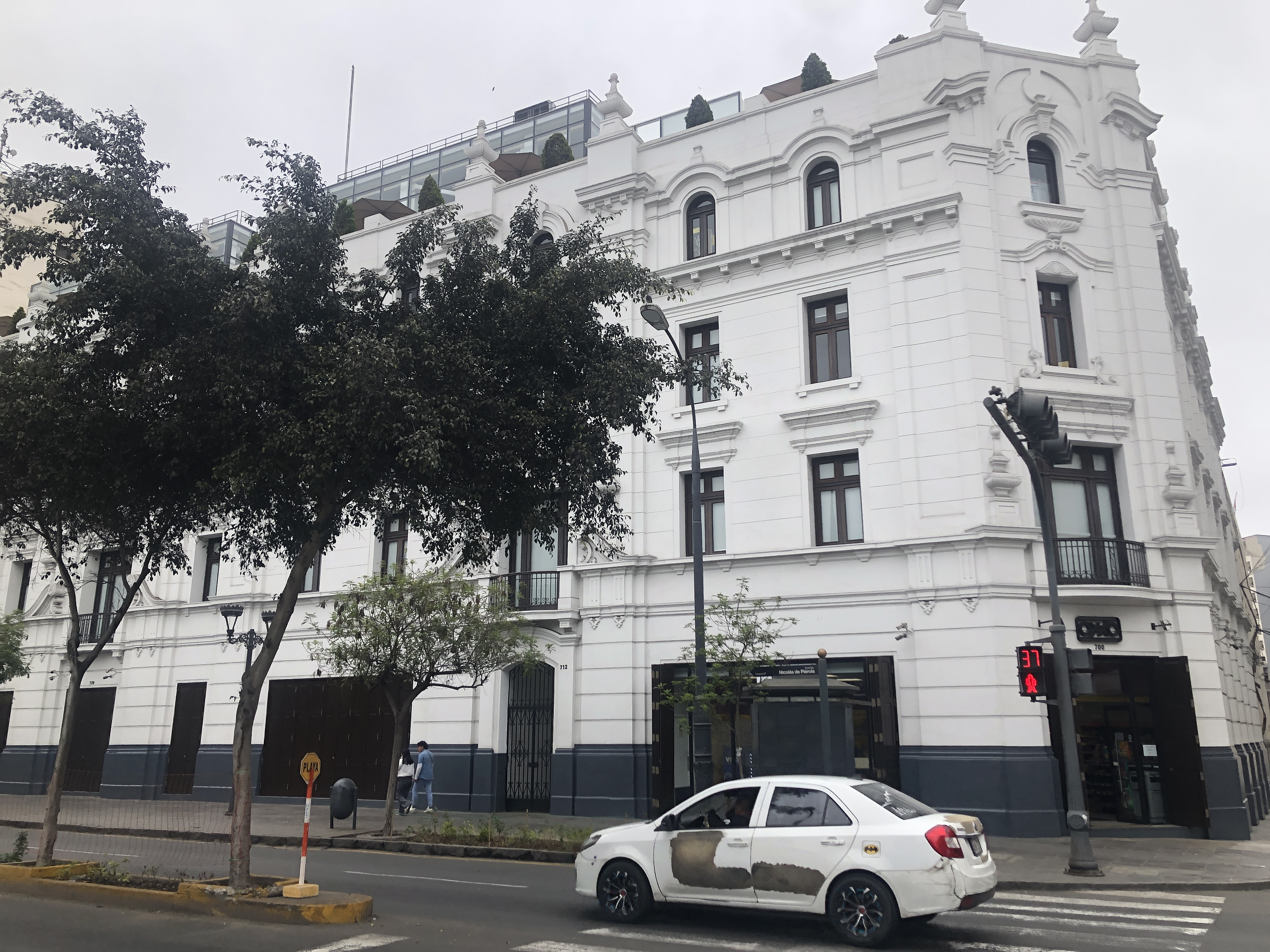
Edificio Monopinta

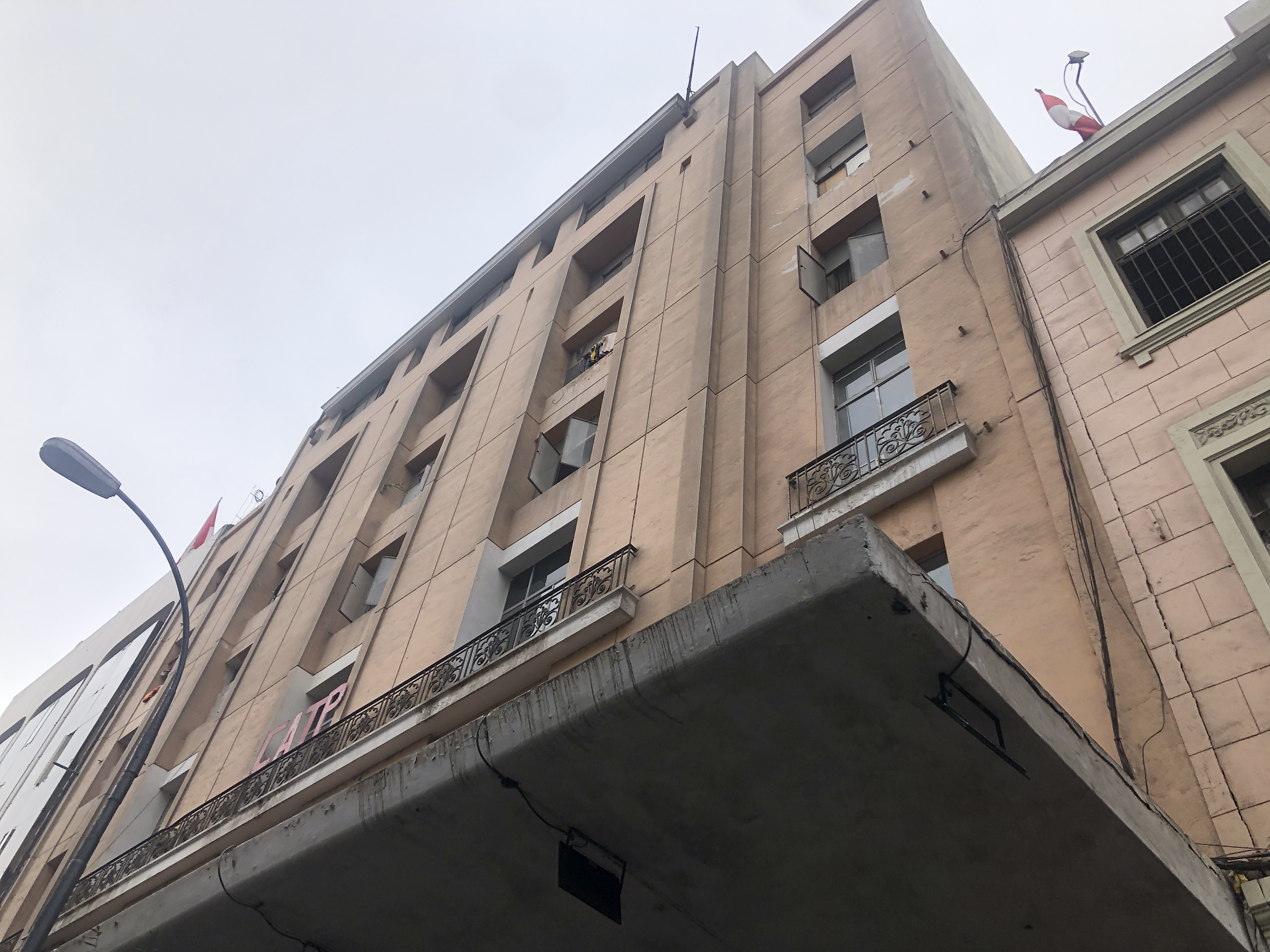
Maison de France

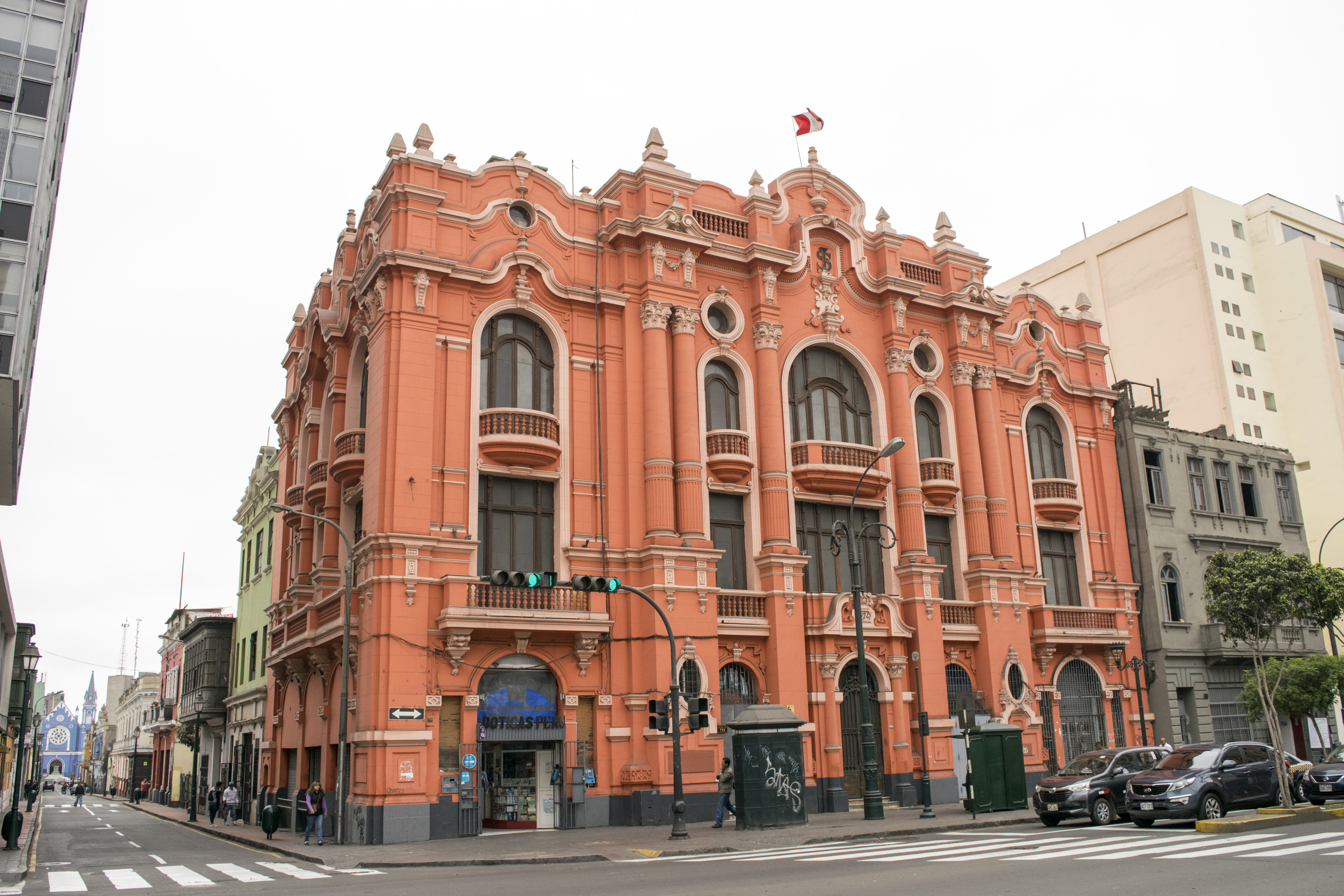
Sociedad de Ingenieros del Perú

The avenue's sixth block includes the Raffo Building, an Art Deco (buque) mixed-use building designed by Guillermo Payet. It hosted the honorary consulate of the State of Israel prior to the opening of an embassy. The avenue's seventh block includes the Monopinta Building and the Maison de France, both 20th-century buildings of different time periods. The building of the Sociedad de Ingenieros del Perú, built in 1924 under the supervision of Ricardo de Jaxa Malachowski to house the Peruvian Engineers Association, is located at its southeastern corner.

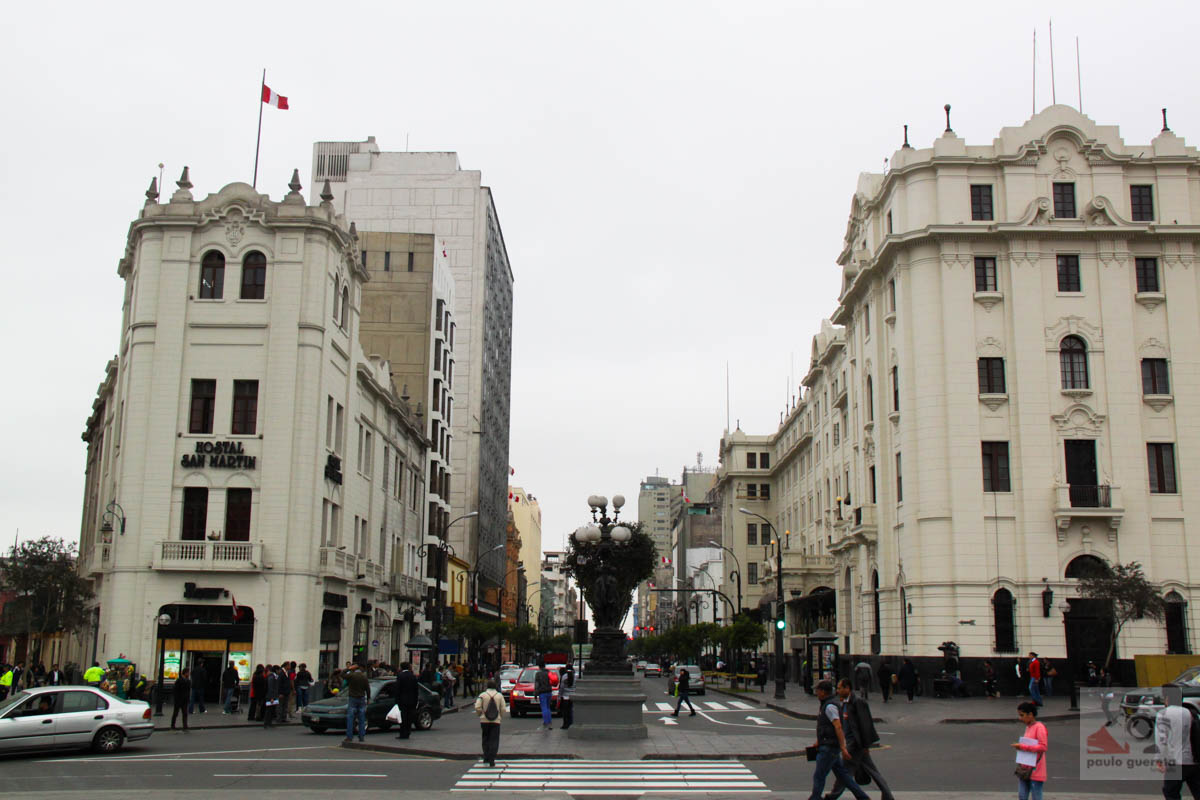
View of Giacoletti Building and the Gran Hotel Bolívar

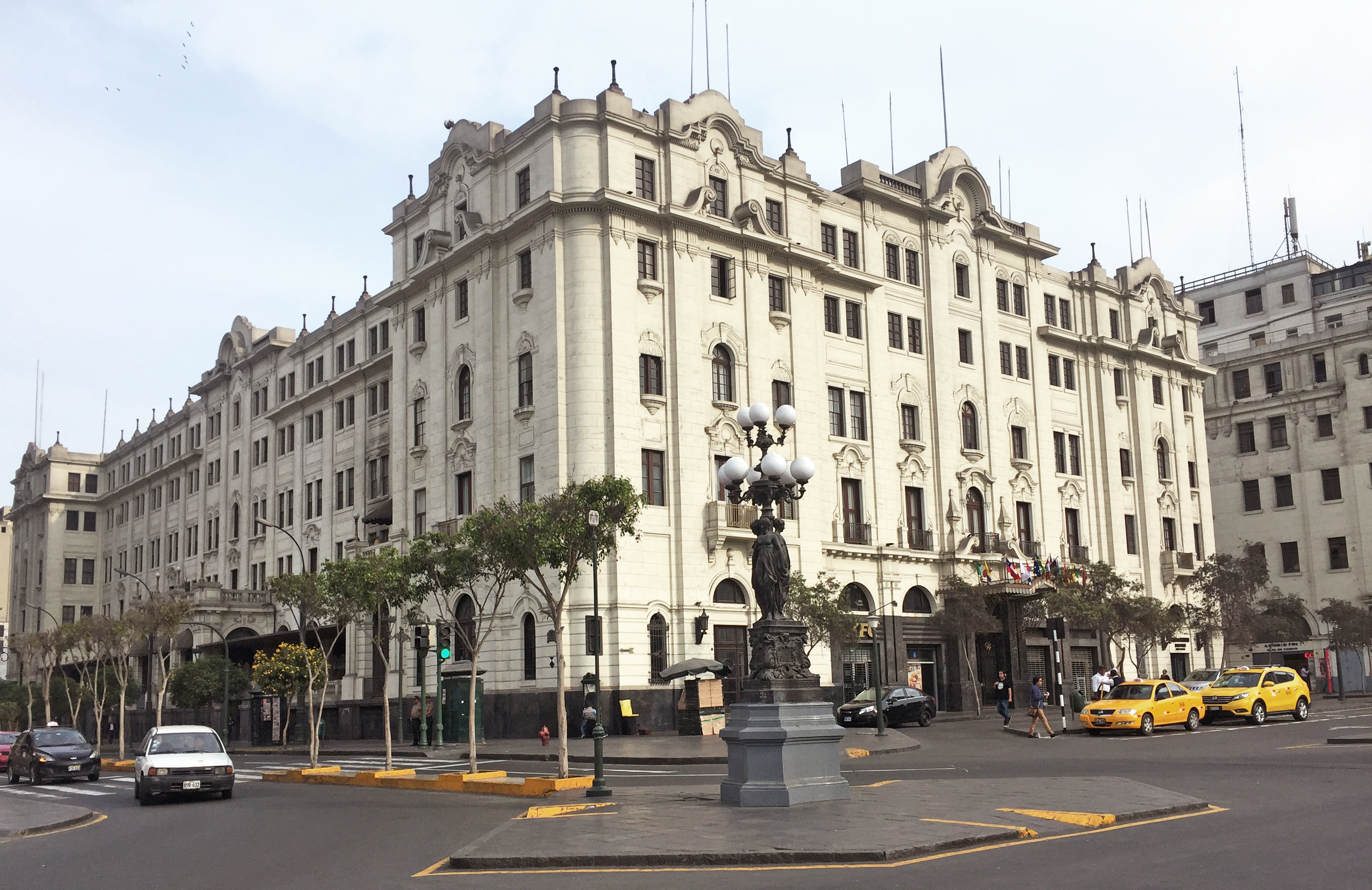
The hotel and the Lamp of the Three Graces

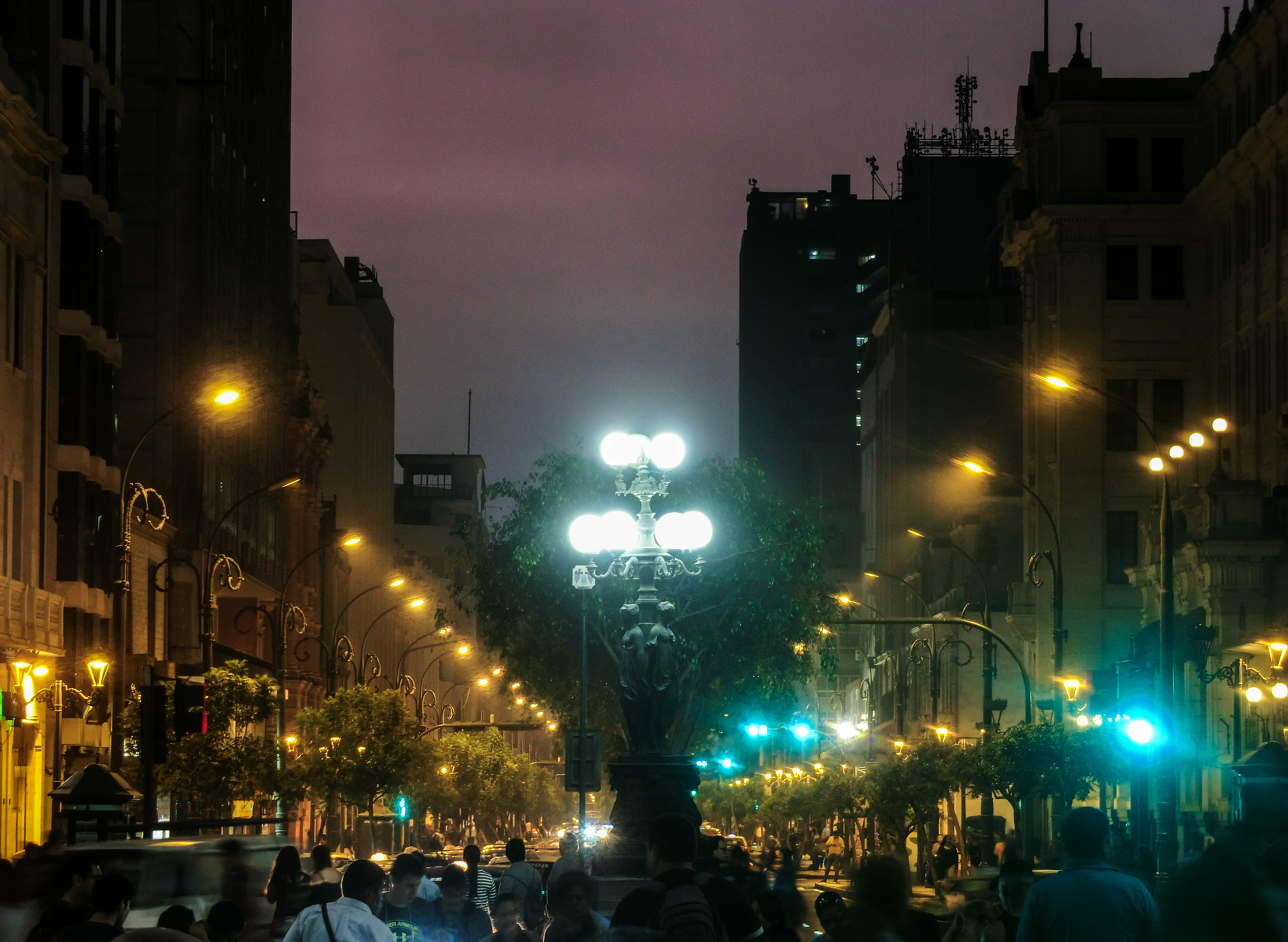
Nighttime view

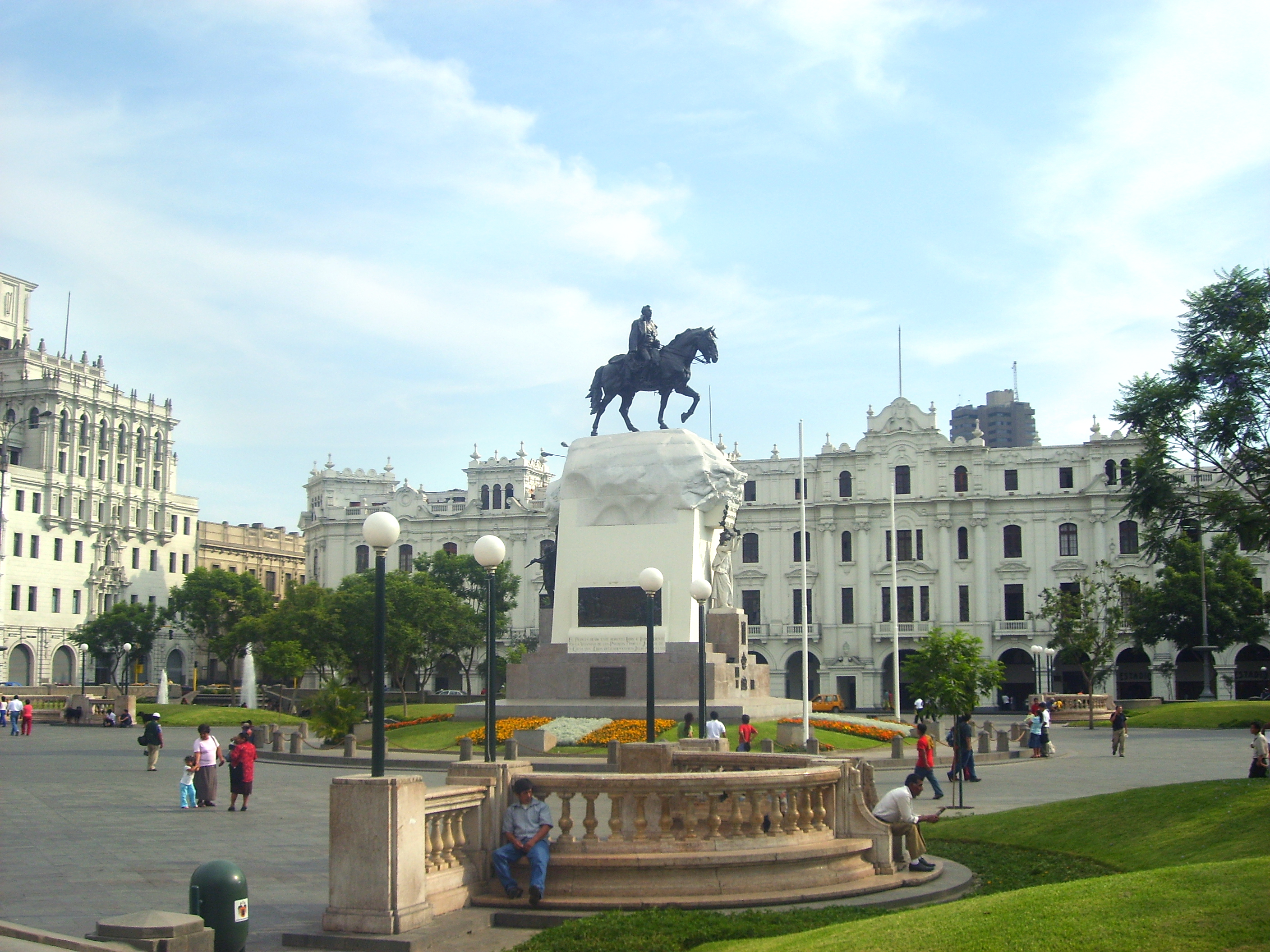
San Martín Square

The avenue's eighth block concludes the section known as Colmena Izquierda. Its northern part is occupied by the Gran Hotel Bolívar, built in 1924 as part of the national celebrations commemorating the Centennial of the Independence of Peru. The Giacoletti Building, built in 1912, is located at its southeastern corner. This section ends with a sculpted lamppost based on an earlier marble work by French sculptor Germain Pilon. The avenue's ninth block surrounds San Martín Square on both sides since 1921.

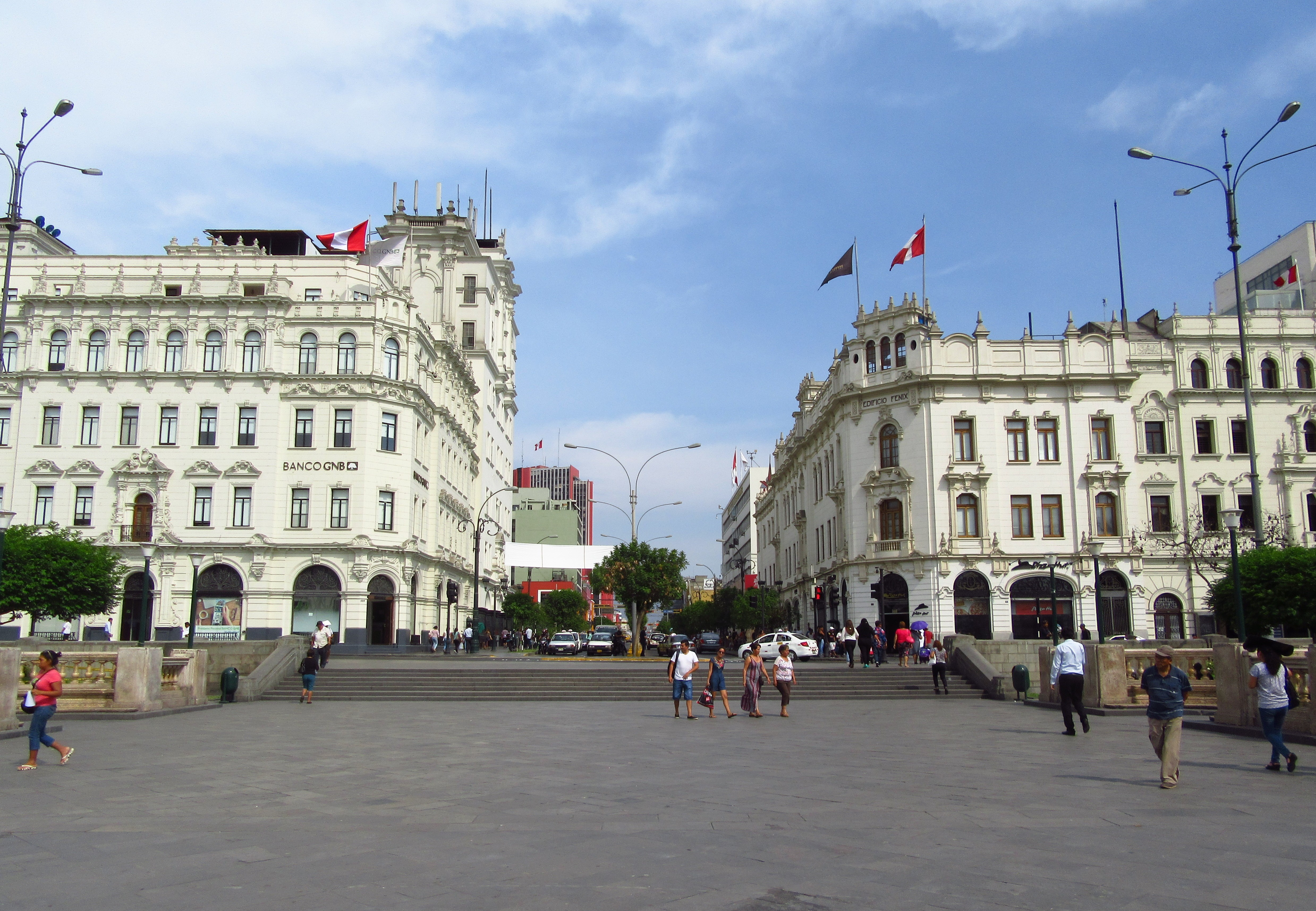
View from San Martín Square

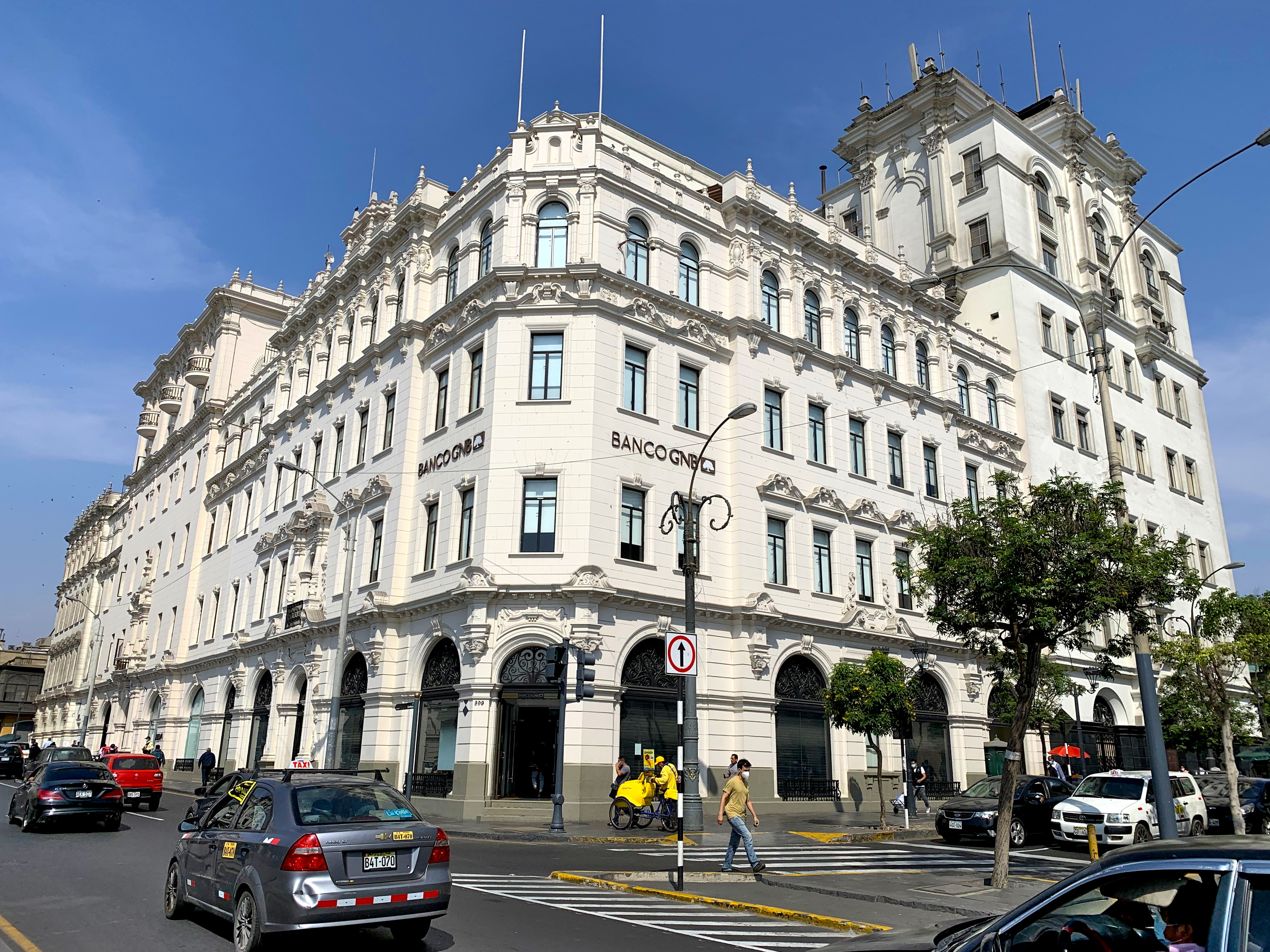
CPC and Telefónica buildings

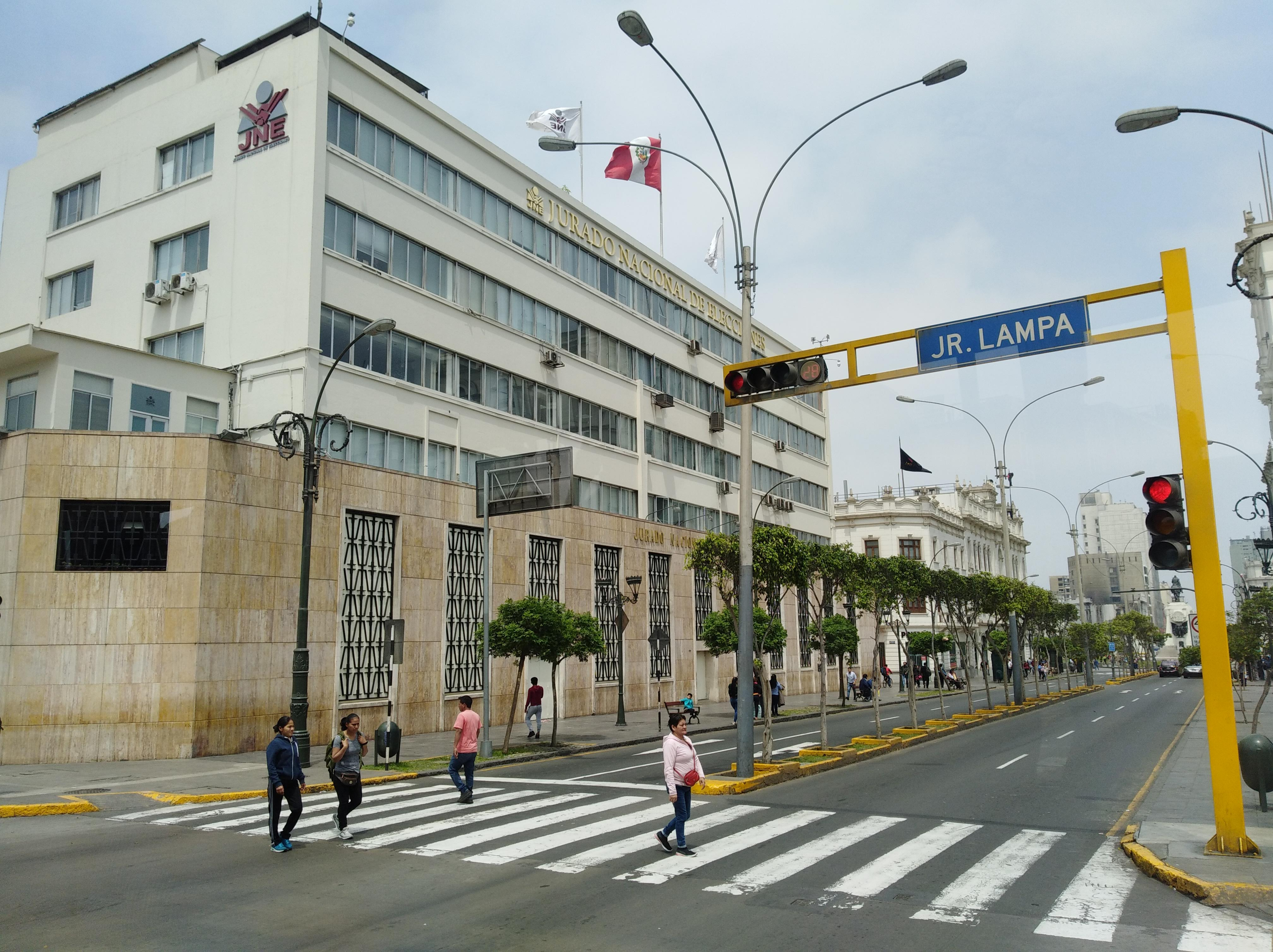
JNE headquarters

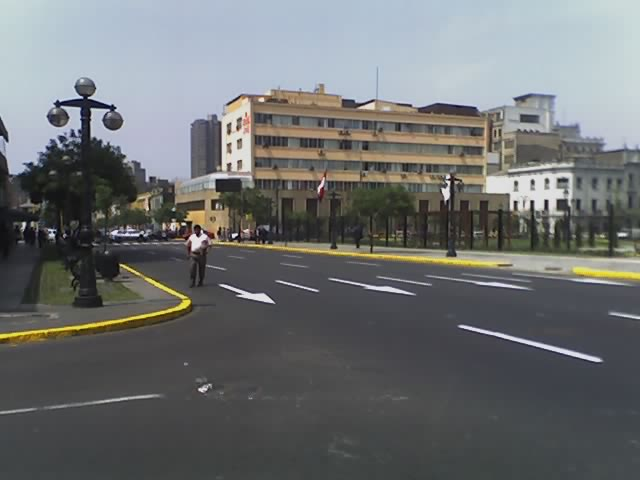
JNE Building and Democracy Square

The avenue's tenth block, divided into two parts by Contumazá Street, begins the section known as Colmena Derecha. The Fénix and Fénix-Encarnación buildings, as well as the premises of the National Jury of Elections (JNE), are located to its south. To their north are the Cerro de Pasco Copper (CPC) and Telefónica buildings. These are separated by the aformentioned street from Democracy Square, built to replace the building of the Bank of the Nation that was demolished in 2004 after being set on fire during a large-scale protest in July 2000.

The avenue's eleventh and twelfth blocks are the last part of the avenue in the Damero de Pizarro. The traditional building of the National University of San Marcos (UNMSM) and its adjacent park and church are located to the south. Opposite of the university are Luis Alberto Sánchez Square, which replaced a number of buildings that were demolished in 2010, and the former building of the Ministry of Education. The park has a clock tower dating back to 1921.

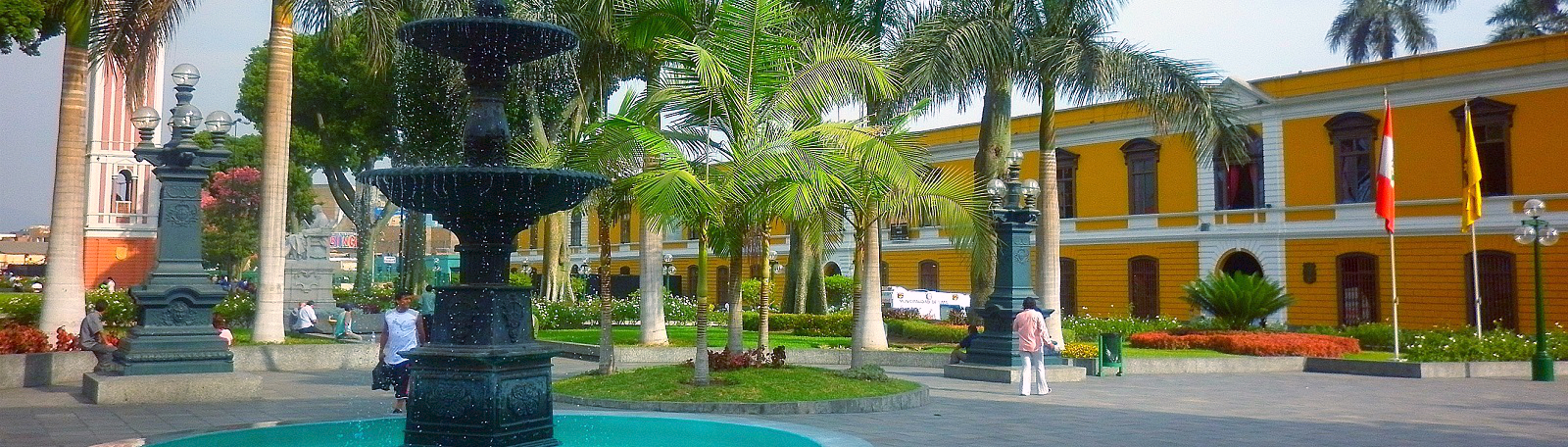
Casona of the UNMSM

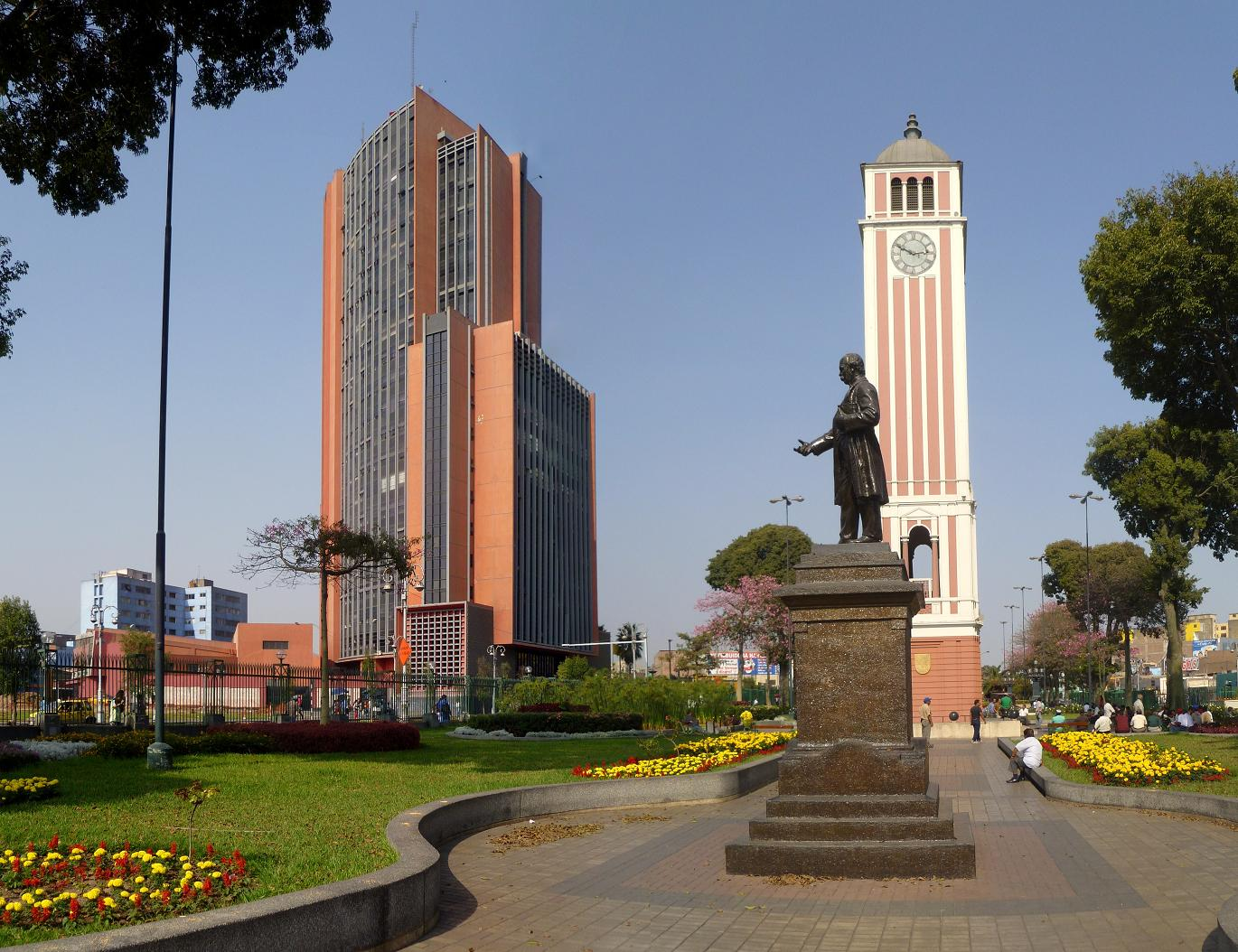
The park, its clock tower and the Justice Court

The avenue crosses Abancay Avenue and continues towards Barrios Altos, where it passes through the Fort of Santa Catalina, which was divided into two parts when the avenue was built. Its former southern part functioned as a prison until 2014. The avenue concludes when it reaches Miguel Grau Avenue.

== Transport ==
The street is navigable in its entirety. Its intersection with Camaná Street, is a taxi stop of the Urban Transport Authority. Additionally, two bus routes intersect with the avenue: one belonging to the Metropolitano and the other to the city's airport.

=== Bus service ===
Estación Colmena, a station of the Metropolitano bus system, operates north of the street's intersection with Lampa Street. This station is part of the system's Route E since January 2023.

Since 2025, Jorge Chávez International Airport's AeroDirecto bus service operates its "Centro" route, which starts in front of the Gran Hotel Bolívar, and directly travels to the city's airport.

== See also ==
- Historic Centre of Lima
- Avenida Emancipación
