= Democracy Square (Peru) =

Cultural heritage site in Peru

Coordinates: 12°03′08″S 77°02′00″W

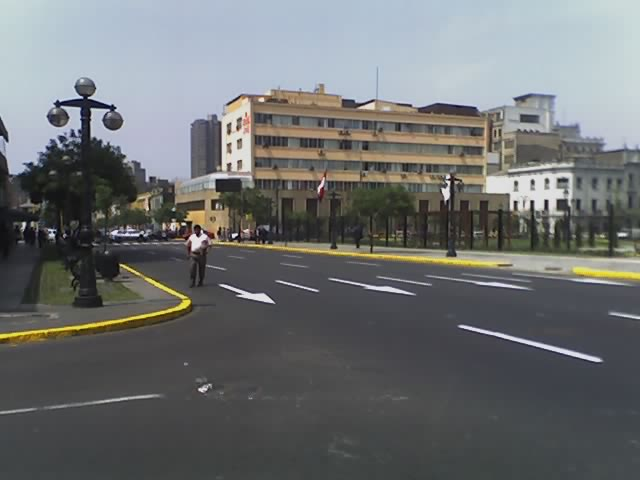

- Location within Lima
- Location: Lima, Peru

History
- Built: 2006

UNESCO World Heritage Site
- Official name: Plaza de la Democracia
- Type: Non-movable
- Criteria: Monument
- Designated: 1991
- Part of: Historic Centre of Lima
- Reference no.: 500

Democracy Square (Spanish: Plaza de la Democracia) is a public square in the Historic Centre of Lima, Peru. It is located on the former site of the Bank of the Nation Building, which burned down in the year 2000 during the Four Quarters March. The park's address is 1045 Nicolás de Piérola Avenue.

In 2023, the Metropolitan Municipality of Lima approved that the square be renamed after Luis Giampietri.

== Overview ==
The square is located in the Historic Centre of Lima, one block away from the Plaza San Martín and one block away from the University Park. The headquarters of the National Jury of Elections (JNE) are located in front of the park on Nicolás de Piérola avenue. The park features a small monolith in its centre with the park's name.

The park is used for public events, such as book fairs, and protests, such as the 2022 Peruvian economic protests or the 2022–2023 Peruvian protests

== History ==
=== Original building (1962–2000) ===
The plaza was formerly the location of a building that housed the Banco Comercial del Perú and later the Banco de la Nación. The building was designed by Peruvian architect Enrique Seoane Ros, and built by Flores & Costa, S.A., a Peruvian construction firm. On July 28, 2000, amid the protests that surrounded the building and the centre of Lima known as the Four Quarters March, an explosion and fire on the building's third floor compromised the building's structural integrity and killed six security guards. The explosion was reportedly caused by undercover agents acting under orders of Vladimiro Montesinos. The intent was to paint the protests in a negative light, and to link them to terrorist groups Shining Path and MRTA.

=== Plaza (2006–present) ===
The current plaza differed from its original designs but was built and completed, being inaugurated on July 27, 2006. The inauguration ceremony was headed by now President Alejandro Toledo, who had participated in the 2000 march. His speech during the event referenced the fire and his anti-Fujimorist stance, referring to Alberto Fujimori's government as tyrannical. Kurt Burneo, the bank's president at the time of both the fire and the ceremony, was present in the event.

== See also ==
- Torre Banco de la Nación, which replaced the bank's former building
