= Banco Comercial bombing =

Terrorist attack in Lima, Peru

- Part of the Peruvian conflict
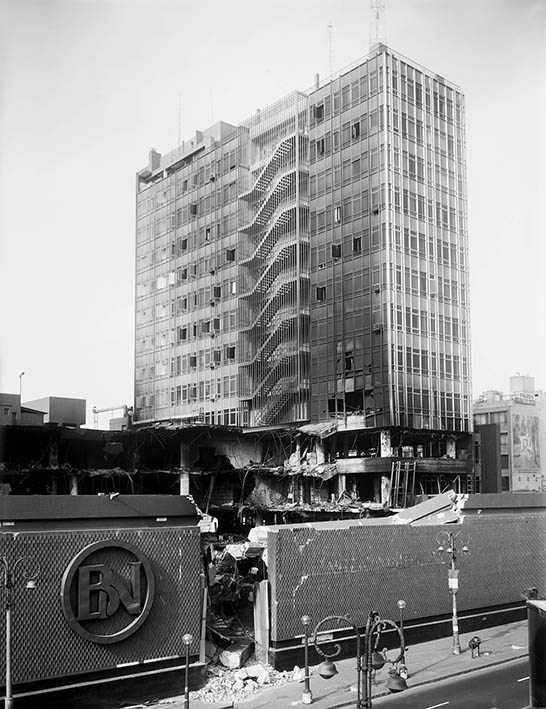
- The building after the bombing
- Location: Historic Centre of Lima, Peru
- Date: July 28, 2000; 26 years ago
- Target: Banco de la Nación building
- Attack type: Bombing
- Deaths: 6
- Perpetrator: Peruvian State
- Convicted: 2

On July 28, 2000, a fire killed six people at the headquarters of the National Bank of Peru amid political protests taking place in neighbouring La Colmena Avenue, in the Historic Centre of Lima. Subsequent investigations found that the fire was caused by an explosion on the third floor of the building, which irreparably damaged the building's integrity.

In 2009, a Peruvian court found Vladimiro Montesinos, former de facto chief of the National Intelligence Service, and Humberto Fernandini, former chief of the Peruvian National Police, guilty of the events, sentencing them to ten and six years in prison, respectively. The attack was reportedly politically motivated, with the intent of discrediting the protests through their association with an event that would've been linked to terrorist groups Shining Path and the Túpac Amaru Revolutionary Movement (MRTA).

== Events ==
On July 28, 2000, amid the anti-government protests that surrounded the building and the historic centre of Lima as a whole, a fire began inside the building. As a result, 6 security guards were killed in fire, while the neighbouring headquarters of the National Jury of Elections was also set on fire. The victims were later identified as Hugo Fernando Miranda Suárez (35), Miguel Pariona Gonzales (28), Guillermo Angulo Concha (42), Víctor López Asca (45), Antonio Gonzales Dávalos (38) and Pedro Valverde Baltazar (35).

Despite claims of the opposite by Walter Chacón, then Minister of the Interior, a police investigation found that the fire was caused by an explosion on the building's third floor, which caused the structural integrity of the building's lower floors to be compromised, causing them to collapse and worsen the gravity of the situation.

== Aftermath ==
The explosion was reportedly caused by undercover agents acting under orders of Vladimiro Montesinos. The intent was to discredit the protests by linking them to terrorist groups Shining Path and MRTA. The fire had been preceded by an attack on a policeman and his car, which was lit on fire, and riots caused by thugs paid and organised by Carlos Regalado, who had been paid by Montesinos, to act as part of the crowd against law enforcement. For his role in the bombing and the deaths of the six security guards, Montesinos was put on trial and sentenced in 2009 to 10 years in prison.

The compromised building was condemned and demolished in 2005, with the basement being refilled with debris from the building. Plans to replace the building with a public square were decided early on, with the new square's name originally being the Plaza of the Nation (Spanish: Plaza de la Nación), and its original design varying significantly from its final result, as it was originally meant to feature a fountain in the centre, and murals related to the event.

== See also ==
- History of Peru (1980–2000)
- Peruvian conflict
