= Banco Comercial (1962–2000) =

Former building in Peru

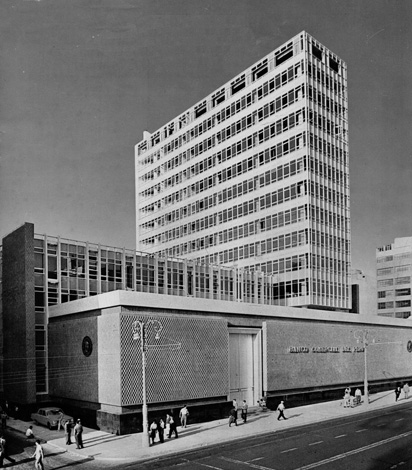
- The building in 1965
- Interactive map of the Banco Comercial area

General information
- Coordinates: 12.05218°S 77.03318°W
- Construction started: 1962
- Construction stopped: 1963
- Destroyed: 28 July 2000
- Owner: Banco de la Nación

Technical details
- Floor count: 14

Design and construction
- Architect: Enrique Seoane Ros

The Banco Comercial was a multi-purpose office building located in the historic centre of Lima, Peru. It housed the Banco Comercial del Perú (BANCOPER), after which it was named, and later the Banco de la Nación. The building was designed by Peruvian architect Enrique Seoane Ros, and built by Flores & Costa, S.A., a Peruvian construction firm.

It was destroyed by a fire during the Four Quarters March caused by a bomb reportedly planted under the orders of Vladimiro Montesinos, then director of the National Intelligence Service, in order to discredit the protests against Alberto Fujimori, then president of Peru.

The building was replaced by the Plaza de la Democracia, inaugurated on July 27, 2006, by Alejandro Toledo. The bank itself moved to San Isidro prior to the inauguration of its new headquarters in 2015.

== History ==
The building occupied an area of 3,114.78 m^{2}. It had a basement used for parking, safekeeping and a base with four floors designated to be used as office space. The building was topped by a tower with 10 extra floors, occupying a total area of 22,000 m^{2} and costing an approximate $60 million.

The building's lower façade featured marble baseboards, wall coverings in glazed national ceramics and natural color anodized aluminum doors and windows. The windows in the first floor were reinforced and the rest were tinted. The lower facade also featured the name of its occupant, Banco Comercial del Perú, until it was changed to the logo of the Banco de la Nación, a circle with the bank's initials (BN) inside.

The building had 7 Schindler elevators meant for public use, plus a freight elevator for cargo. Most of the materials used in the building were specifically chosen to be from Peru instead of being imported from other countries.

The building's basement was the location of the bank's vault, which had a wood finish and was designed to be easily guarded. It was also the location of a discount section that could be accessed by anyone. The building's first floor was made of grey marble.

The first floor's wall that faced the Colmena avenue was decorated by a mural of Machu Picchu that measured 4 × 15 metres reproduced on canvas. The furniture was made of mahogany or aluminum and walnut. Another wall featured a collection of moneyboxes from different countries. The building's third floor had offices and a staircase with suspended steps made of concrete covered in carpet.

The building's office tower was designed to work independently of the bank building, being leased to private tenants.

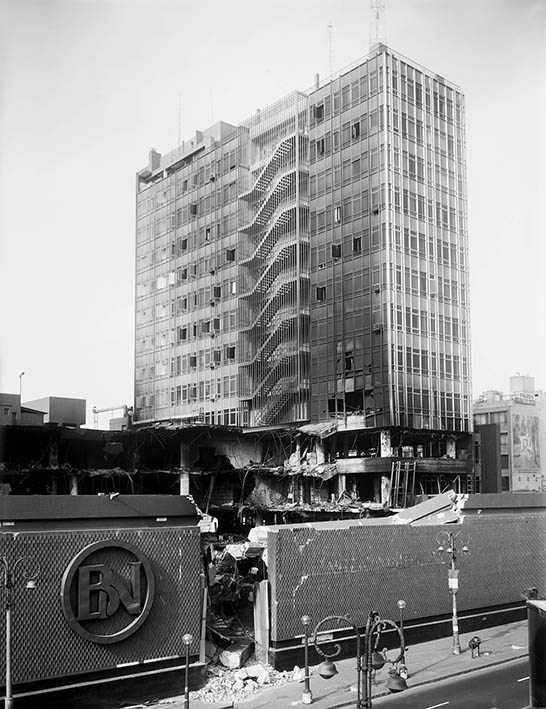
The building after the fire.

On July 28, 2000, amid the protests that surrounded the building and the centre of Lima known as the Four Quarters March, a fire began inside the building. Despite claims by Minister of the Interior Walter Chacón of the opposite, the fire was caused by an explosion on the building's third floor which caused the structural integrity of the building's lower floors to be compromised, causing them to collapse and worsen the gravity of the situation. As a result, 6 security guards were killed in fire.

The explosion was reportedly caused by undercover agents acting under orders of Vladimiro Montesinos. The intent was to paint the protests in a negative light, and to link them to terrorist groups Shining Path and MRTA. The fire had been preceded by an attack on a policeman and his car, which was lit on fire, and riots caused by thugs paid organized by Carlos Regalado, who had been paid by Montesinos, to act as part of the crowd against law enforcement. The JNE building across was also set on fire. For his role in the bombing and the deaths of the six security guards, Montesinos was put on trial and sentenced in 2009 to 10 years in prison.

Once destroyed, and its structural integrity compromised, the building was condemned and demolished in 2005, with the basement being refilled with debris from the building. Plans to replace the building with a plaza were decided early on, with the new square's name originally being the Plaza of the Nation (Spanish: Plaza de la Nación), and its original design varying significantly from its final result, as it was originally meant to feature a fountain in the centre, and murals related to the event.

== See also ==
- Torre Banco de la Nación, which replaced the bank's former building
