= Torre Banco de la Nación =

Tallest building in Peru

Coordinates: 12.0872°S 77.0004°W

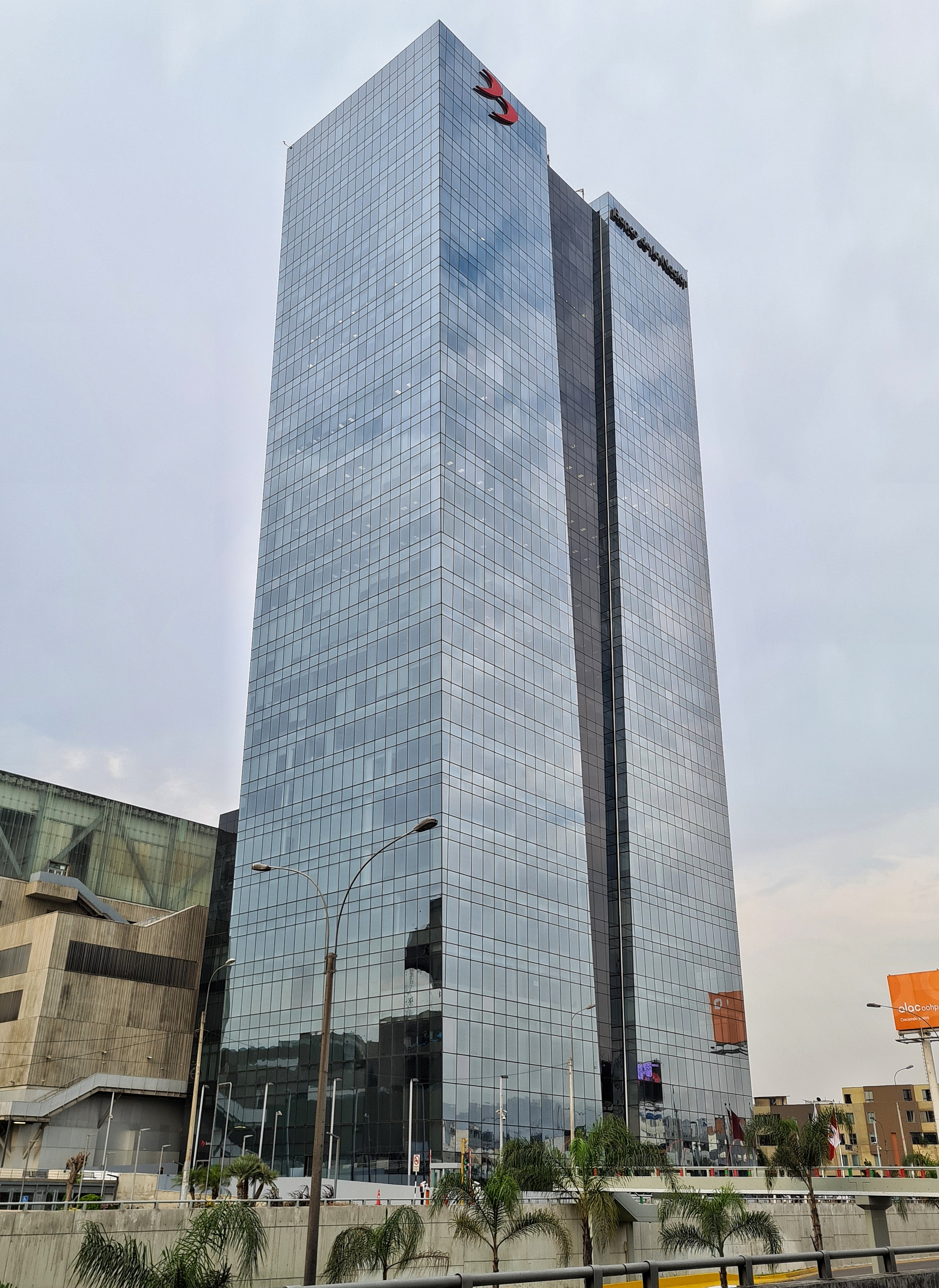
- The building in 2021
- Interactive map of the Torre Banco de la Nación area

General information
- Location: San Borja, Lima
- Construction started: October 2013
- Construction stopped: October 2015
- Inaugurated: 2015
- Owner: Banco de la Nación; Peruvian State

Technical details
- Floor count: 30

Design and construction
- Architect: Bernardo Fort

The Bank of the Nation Tower (Spanish: Torre Banco de la Nación) (Note: Also known as: Nueva Sede del BN; Torre Hito Cultural or Edificio Hito Cultural; Banco de la Nación - Centro de Convenciones) is a multi-purpose building in Lima and the tallest building in Peru. It serves as the headquarters of the Bank of the Nation, after which it's named.

== History ==
The building was designed to house the new headquarters of Banco de la Nación, a financial entity of the Peruvian State. After the fire that occurred during the Four Quarters March in 2000 that destroyed the original building (built by Enrique Seoane Ros), the headquarters had moved to the district of San Isidro. It was designed by the Peruvian architect Bernardo Fort. Its location was set in a strategic area of Av. Javier Prado Este, next to the Museum of the Nation, the La Cultura station of the Lima Metro and the future Lima Convention Center, which could be known as the new cultural center of Lima, in the district of San Borja.

The construction of the tower was in charge of construction company Cosapi, with an investment of approximately $150 million. Construction began in October 2013 and was completed in October 2015, consisting of a 140.1-meter-high, 30-story building, with a constructed area of approximately 66,000 m² and a helipad on top.

In 2015, the lower floors were used for the Board of Governors of the World Bank and the International Monetary Fund.

== See also ==
- List of tallest buildings in Peru
- Edificio Interbank
