= Edificio Tacna-Colmena =

Building in Lima, Peru

Tacna-Colmena Building
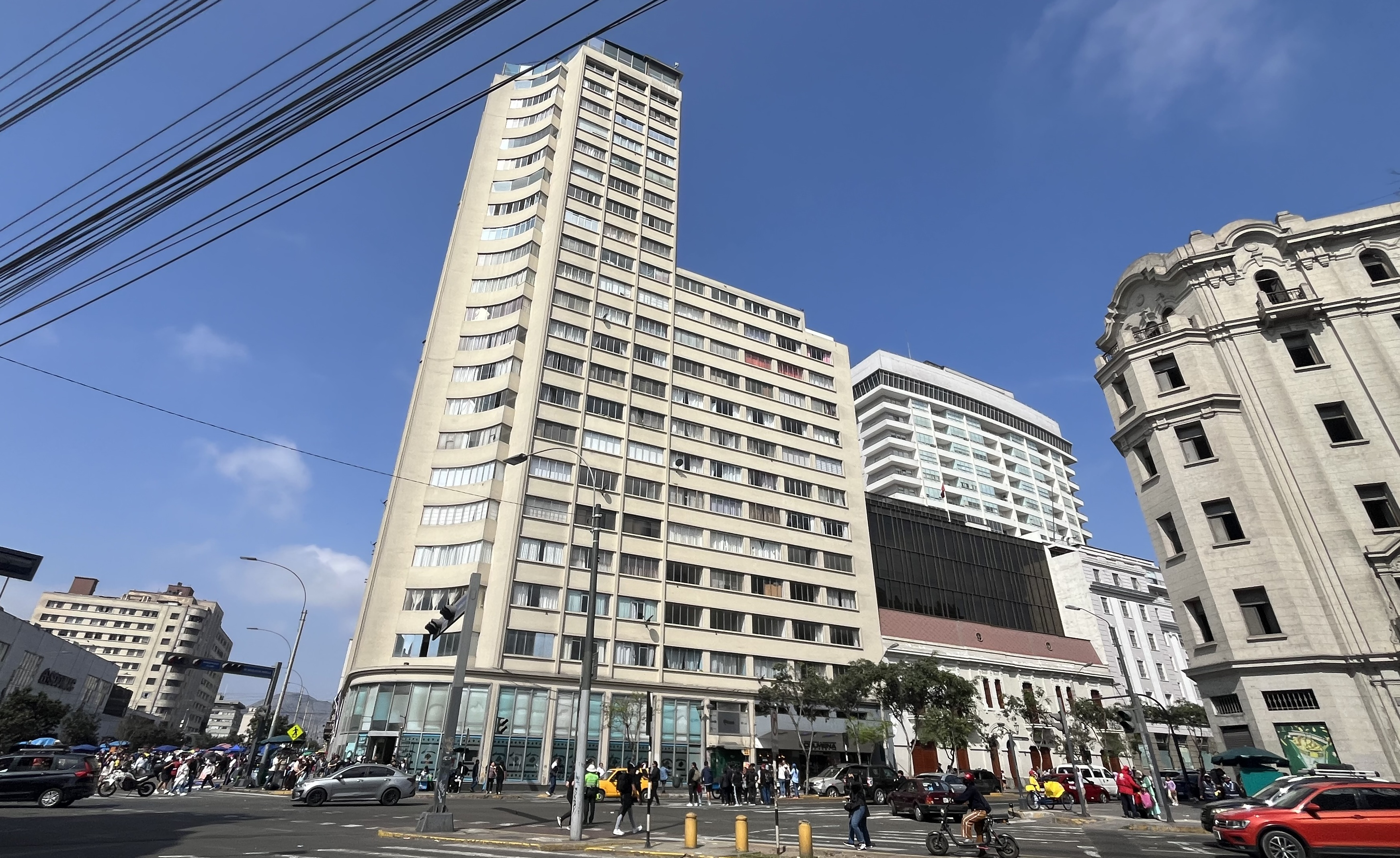
- Interactive map of the Tacna-Colmena Building area
- Alternative names: La Colmena Building

General information
- Architectural style: Brutalist
- Location: Historic Centre of Lima
- Construction started: 1959
- Construction stopped: 1960

Technical details
- Floor count: 23

The Tacna-Colmena Building (Spanish: Edificio Tacna-Colmena), also known as the La Colmena Building (Spanish: Edificio La Colmena) is a building located on the periphery of the Historic Centre of Lima, Peru. It stands at the intersection of Tacna and Nicolás de Piérola avenues, a few blocks from Plaza San Martín.

This 23-story building, topped by a private access penthouse with a pool, was built from 1959 to 1960 by Propiedades Horizontales S.A., a Peruvian construction company. At 84 meters high, it was the second tallest building in Lima after the 86-meter Javier Alzamora Valdez Building and was the first building with anti-seismic construction in Peru. The Tacna-Colmena building housed the Cine Colmena and the Banco Popular del Perú on the first floor. It was also the location an apartment owned by Mariano Prado, Manuel Prado's son.

It currently works as a home for private homes and offices, and can be seen from various points in the district.

== See also ==
- List of tallest buildings in Peru
