= Cecilia Chacón =

Peruvian politician (born 1971)

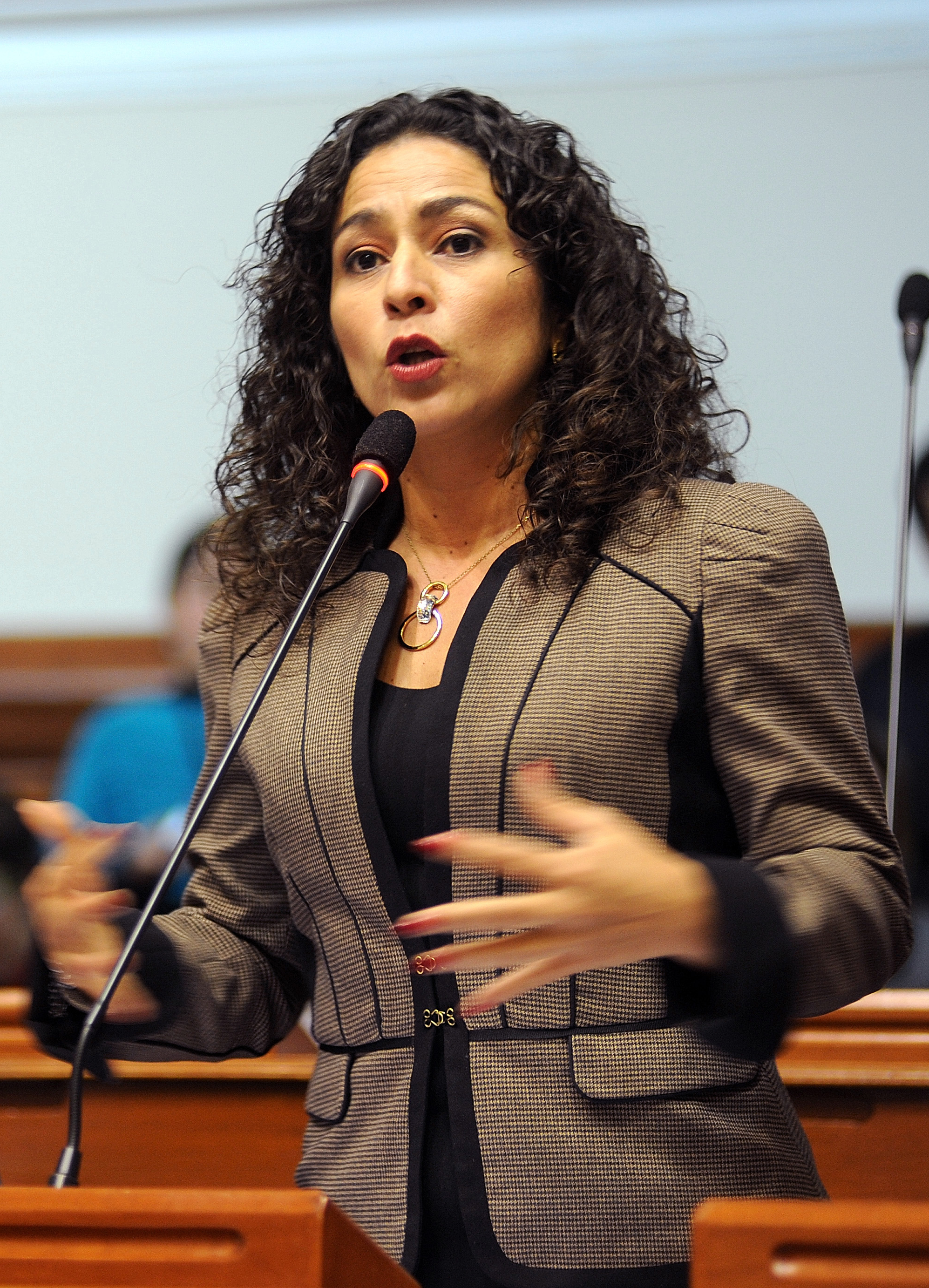
- Cecilia Chacón

Member of the Chamber of Deputies
- Incumbent
- Assumed office 26 July 2026
- Constituency: Lima

Member of Congress
- In office 26 July 2006 – 30 September 2019
- Constituency: Cajamarca (2006–2016); Lima (2016–2019)

Personal details
- Born: Cecilia Isabel Chacón de Vettori; 3 February 1971 (age 55) Chiclayo, Peru
- Party: Popular Force
- Children: 2
- Parent: Walter Chacón (father)

Cecilia Isabel Chacón de Vettori (born 3 February 1971) is a Peruvian Fujimorist politician. She is the daughter of Walter Chacón, an ex-army general and Interior Minister during the Alberto Fujimori administration She is a former Congresswoman. She was elected in 2006 and re-elected in 2011 for a five-year term both in the Cajamarca Region and in 2016 for another five-year term, this time, representing the capital, Lima, but her term was cut short by the dissolution of the Congress by Martín Vizcarra in September 2019. From 2006 to 2010 she belonged to the Alliance for the Future and since 2011 she belongs to the Popular Force. Professionally she was active in the tourism sector. Prior to political office she worked as a waitress during the time that she lived in the United States.

== Biography ==
She was born in Chiclayo in 1971, the daughter of the former Minister of the Interior and former Commander General of the Army, Walter Chacón Málaga and Aurora Isabel De Vettori Rojas. He studied at the Reina de los Ángeles School. He entered the Ricardo Palma University to study business administration; however, these studies were not completed. She was married to Luis Portal Barrantes, with whom she had 2 children: Miguel Stefano and Paolo Portal Chacón.

In Cajamarca, she was president of the Regional Chamber of Tourism, as well as president of the Cajamarca Hotels and Restaurants Association. She has also held the position of president of the Hostal Portada del Sol Hacienda.
