= Javier Alzamora Valdez Building =

Building in Lima, Peru

Coordinates: 12.0539°S 77.0305°W

- Edificio Javier Alzamora Valdez
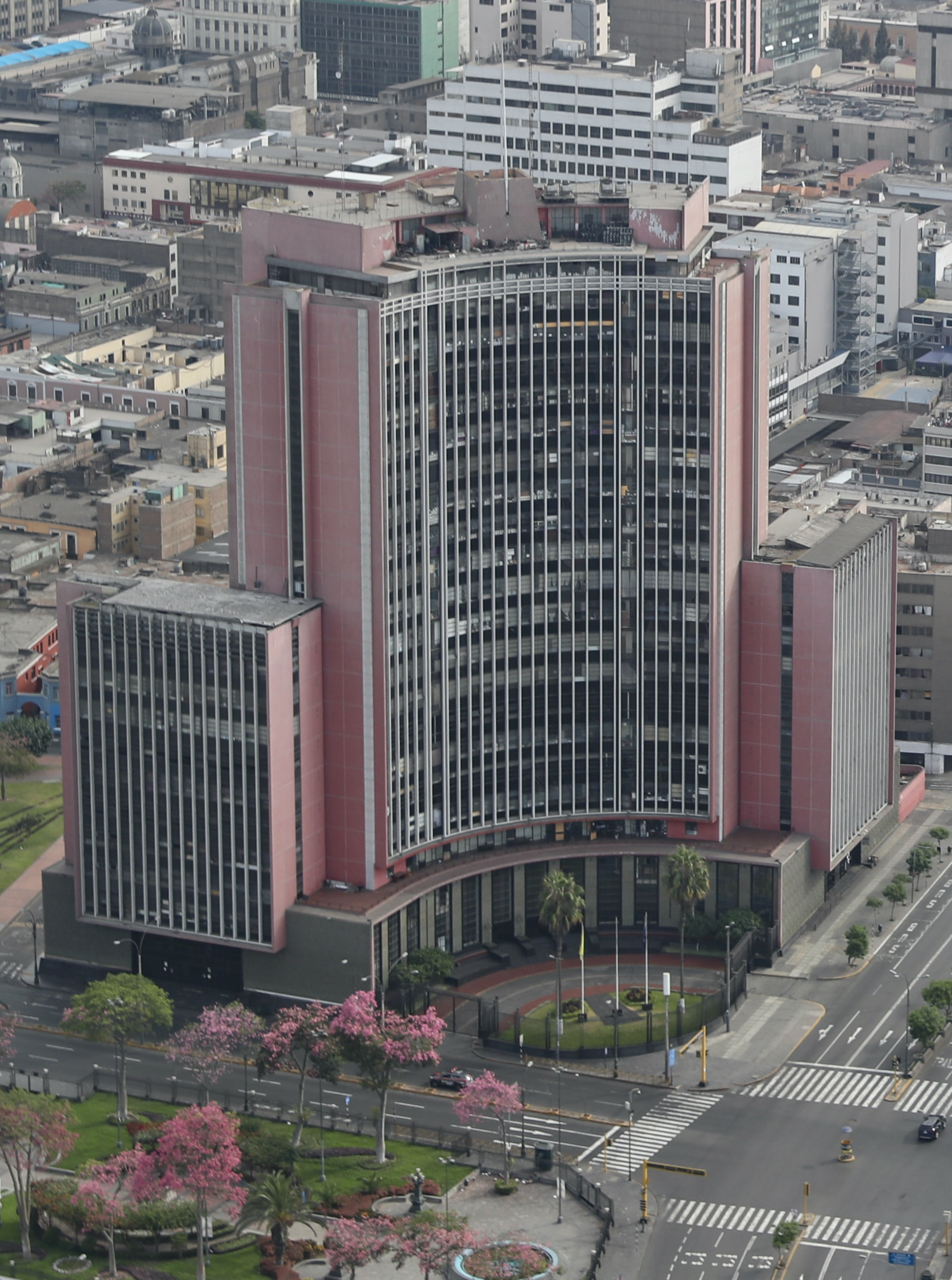
- The building in 2020
- Interactive map of the Javier Alzamora Valdez Building area

General information
- Architectural style: Classical–Modern mix
- Location: Historic Centre of Lima
- Construction started: October 27, 1952
- Construction stopped: July 17, 1954
- Cost: $3,500,000
- Owner: Peruvian State

Height
- Height: 86.84 metres

Technical details
- Floor count: 22

Design and construction
- Architect: Enrique Seoane Ros

The Javier Alzamora Valdez Building (Spanish: Edificio Javier Alzamora Valdez) is located in the historic center of Lima, Peru. It stands at the intersection of Abancay and Colmena avenues, next to the University Park. Formerly the headquarters of the Ministry of Education, it's the main location of the Superior Court of Justice of Lima, part of the Judiciary of Peru.

== History ==
Construction began on the building on October 27, 1952 and was inaugurated on July 17, 1954 as part of the public works carried out during the Ochenio of General Manuel A. Odría. President Odría and his Ministry of Education, Juan Mendoza Rodríguez, were present both at the laying of the first stone and at the inauguration of the now completely constructed building. There was a project to build a twin tower in front of the building, on Abancay avenue, which would complete a circular space, but only the foundations and basement were built. It is what later became known as the "El Hueco" Shopping Center.

Originally it served as the headquarters of the Ministry of Education of Peru (then the Ministry of Public Education of Peru), in addition it was also the first headquarters of Channel 7 until the 1970s, it had this function that it maintained until the beginning of the 1990s when this entity moved to a new location in the San Borja district. Later, the headquarters of the Superior Court of Justice of Lima and the civil, labor and family courts, as well as the superior civil courts of Lima, were installed in the building. From then on he took his new name, Javier Alzamora Valdez, who was president of the Superior Court of Huaraz, member of the Supreme Court of Justice and First President of the National Council of Justice.

== Architecture ==
Its design was in charge of the Peruvian architect Enrique Seoane Ros, who carried out numerous and varied preliminary projects for this building before embodying the final idea, combining the classicist and modern styles in a structure that satisfied Odría's constructive expectations.

The volume of the building is convex in shape towards the corner of the avenues, containing a block of twenty-two levels, a basement and ten elevators (six for public use and four private which reach the twentieth floor), flanked by two lateral blocks. twelve levels each. The structure is made of steel, which was imported from the Mann factory in Germany, and reinforced concrete. The central block reaches 87.50 meters in height and was the tallest public building in the country for many years (until the construction in 1974 of the Lima Civic Center). Its façade is covered with "Sprandelite" ceramic and glass material, which was used for the first time in Peru. The entire construction cost S/.94 million soles.

In its main hall there are murals with ceramic veneers inspired by the Chimú culture and mural paintings alluding to education in Peru, the work of painters such as Teodoro Núñez Ureta, Juan Manuel Ugarte Eléspuru, Enrique Camino Brent, among others. This mural as well as the facilities on the first floor were damaged during the Four Quarters March in the year 2000.

In 2007, the building suffered some moderate damage to its structure as a result of an 8.0 magnitude earthquake in Ica.

== See also ==
- List of tallest buildings in Peru
- Edificio Petroperú
