= Lavado de bandera =

Political ceremony in Peru

The Washing of the flag (Spanish: Lavado de bandera) is form of political protest that began on May 20, 2000 in Peru against the government of Alberto Fujimori. The meaning of the ritual was to symbolize the "washing of all corruption" in the country through the washing of the national flag "dirtied" by the abuse of power exercised by the Fujimori government. That year, from May to November 24, 2000, the washing of the flag took place every Friday in the Plaza Mayor of Lima and in 27 other cities in the country and abroad.

In 2000, the protest took place every Friday from noon to 3 p.m. in the Plaza Mayor of Lima and in front of the Government Palace. Dozens of people, and in some cases hundreds, gathered with a basin that they filled with water from the square's fountain. They sang the national anthem, mixed water with soap and introduced the Peruvian flag to wash it and then hang it on a temporary clothesline. Eventually the ritual also incorporated military uniforms, judges' togas and the Vatican flag.

== See also ==
- Procesión de la Bandera
