= Bank of the Nation (Peru) =

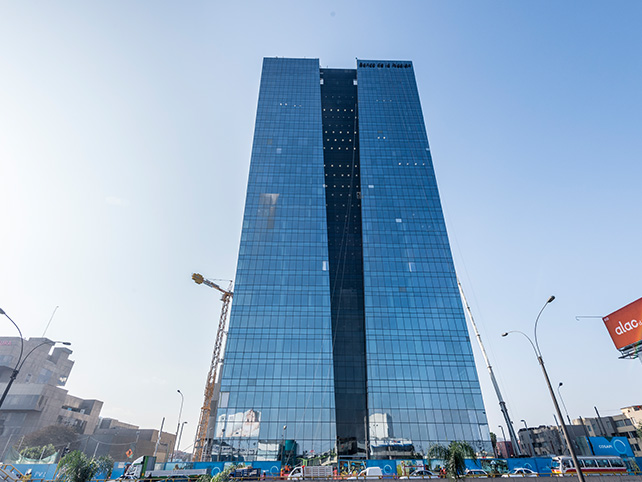
- Headquarters of the bank in Lima
- Industry: Finance
- Founded: 1966
- Headquarters: Lima, Peru
- Products: Financial services
- Website: www.bn.com.pe

The Bank of the Nation, known in Spanish as the Banco de la Nación, is the bank which represents the Peruvian government in financial transactions in both the public and private sectors, as well as at both domestic and international levels. It is a state institution, but it should not be confused with the Central Reserve Bank of Peru, the central bank which coins money. The BN (its official Spanish initials) belongs to the Peruvian Ministry of Economy and Finance. Its headquarters is located in the San Isidro District of Lima, the capital of Peru.

== History ==
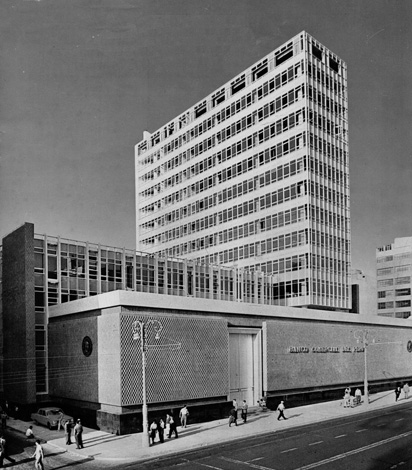
The building in 1965

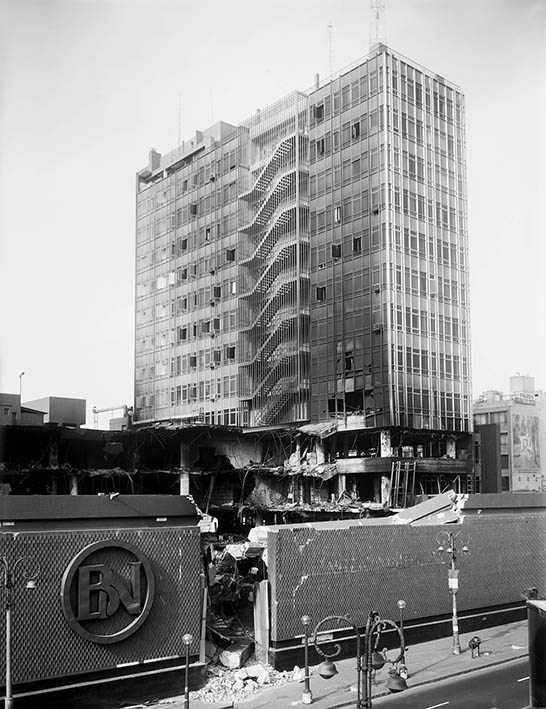
The building in 2000

The BN was created January 27, 1966, by Law 16000, approved by the Peruvian congress and was signed into law by the then-president Fernando Belaúnde Terry. Its predecessors date to 1905, when José Pardo created the Caja de Depósitos y Consignaciones or Bank of Deposits and Consignments.

During the Four Quarters March in 2000 the original building (built by Enrique Seoane Ros), was destroyed by a fire. The headquarters moved to the district of San Isidro until the opening of the bank's new headquarters in 2015.

The Bank of the Nation has functioned uninterrupted since its creation. Currently, it employs its own system of ATMs and provides its own credit and debit cards.

== Functions ==
Throughout the years, the bank's functions have either been expanded or reduced according to the policies of the current government although its most basic functions usually never change. Currently, the Bank of the Nation is used to:

- Provide payment services in accordance with the policies of the General Directory of the Public Treasury
- Provide collection services on behalf of tax creditors
- Perform operations on behalf of sub-accounts of the public treasury
- Act as the primary financial agency of the state
- Act on the behalf of other banks and financial institutions in the channeling of resources
- Participate in the foreign commerce transactions of the state
- Grant credit to the Central Government, to Regional governments, and to local governments, in cases when they have not been granted by the National Finance System
- Credit granted by the bank is not subject to the limits established by the General Law of Banking, Financial, and Insurance institutions
- Provide correspondence services
- Provide services to accounts of entities belonging both the National public sector and state providers
- Receive savings deposits in locations where private banks don't have offices

== Distribution ==
Branch offices can be found in every Peruvian province, with a total of 403 branch offices, of which 87% are located in rural areas of the country where private banks do not operate
