= Walter Chacón =

Peruvian military personnel (born 1944)

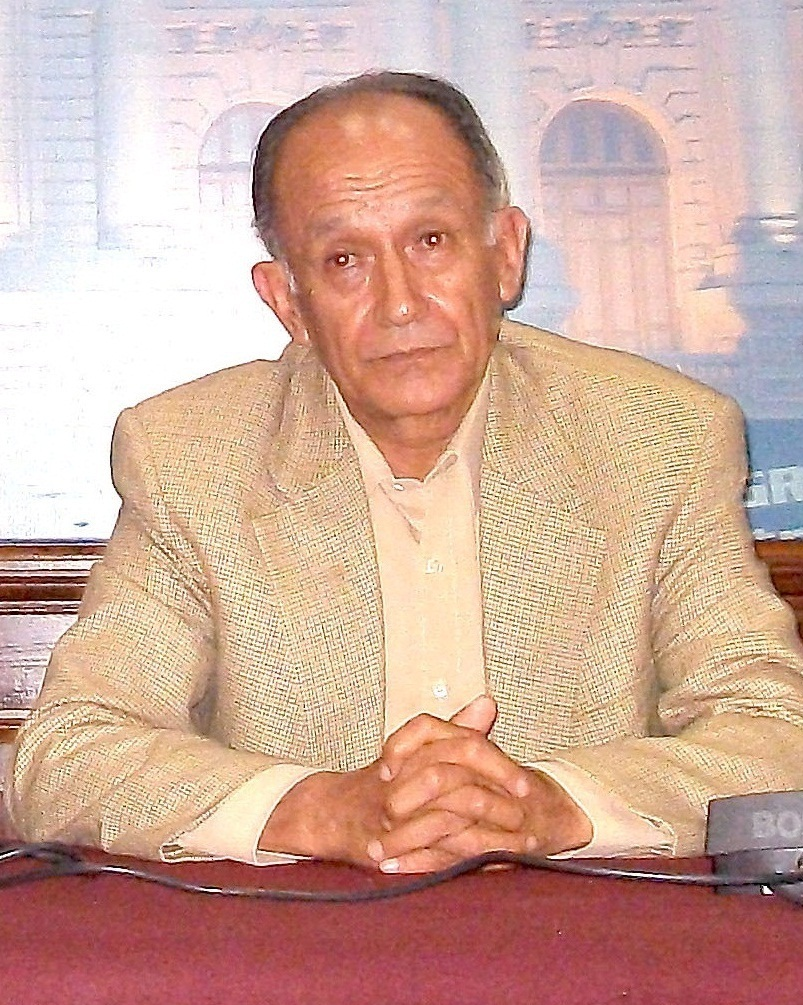
- Walter Chacón

Minister of Interior
- In office 28 July 2000 – 28 October 2000
- President: Alberto Fujimori
- Preceded by: César Saucedo
- Succeeded by: Fernando Dianderas Ottone

Lima City Councilman
- In office 1 January 2007 – 31 December 2010

Personal details
- Born: 23 June 1944 (age 82) Ayabaca, Peru
- Party: Sí Cumple
- Occupation: Military officer

Walter Segundo Gaspar Chacón Málaga (born 23 June 1944) is a Peruvian Fujimorist politician and a former army general. He served as Minister of the Interior and as General Commander of the Army and Head of the Joint Command of the Armed Forces during the government of Alberto Fujimori.

== Biography ==
He was born in Ayabaca, Piura in 1944, the son of Gaspar Chachón and Lucinda Málaga. He studied at the Military School of Chorrillos, graduating on 1 January 1966 as Sub-Lieutenant of Engineering, member of the promotion "Centennial of the Combat of 2 May 1866".

In 1998, with the rank of Brigade General, he was appointed as General Commander of the 4th Infantry Brigade based in the Department of Puno. He was appointed Commander of the I Military Region of Piura in 1999.

He was appointed Minister of the Interior on 28 July 2000, a job he held until 28 October that year, when he was replaced by Fernando Dianderas.

On 28 October 2000 he was appointed General Commander of the Peruvian Army and President of the Joint Command of the Peruvian Armed Forces.

After the fall of the Alberto Fujimori regime, he culminated his functions in high military positions.

He is the father of Fujimori congresswoman Cecilia Chacón and former beauty queen Mónica Chacón.

== Accusations ==
On 19 January 2001 the Anti-Corruption Criminal Prosecutor's Office criminally denounced General Walter Chacón, his wife and children for having found evidence of the alleged commission of the crimes of corruption of officials, against the administration of justice (cover-up), embezzlement and illicit enrichment to the detriment of the State, perpetrated during the period of time in which Chacón had held the post of General Commander of the Army.

In September 2001 an arrest warrant was issued. The general was in prison until December 2004, the month in which he was released after having served more than 36 months in detention without having been sentenced.

In June 2012, the criminal proceedings against the former minister for the misuse of State resources in favor of Alberto Fujimori's re-election campaign were declared prescribed.
