= Enrique Seoane Ros =

Peruvian architect (1915-1980)

- Born: January 12, 1915; Lima, Peru
- Died: July 26, 1980 (aged 65); Lima, Peru
- Occupation: Architect
- Years active: 1934–1980

Enrique Buenaventura Juan Seoane Ros (Lima, January 12, 1915 – July 26, 1980) was a Peruvian modernist architect of the 20th century.

== Early life ==
Seoane was born in Lima on January 12, 1915, to parents Buenaventura Guillermo Seoane García and Rosario Ros Gutiérrez. He studied at the Colegio de La Inmaculada and followed architecture courses at the National School of Engineers, predecessor of the National University of Engineering (UNI).

== Career ==
He graduated as an engineer-architect in 1944 and was a professor at the Department of Architecture at the UNI and at the Federico Villarreal National University.

He was a supporter in favor of a modern style of architecture that would replace the old-fashioned French-style of Lima, and supported—but did not sign—a manifesto that was published in El Comercio and El Arquitecto Peruano in 1947 that supported this movement.

== Selected works ==
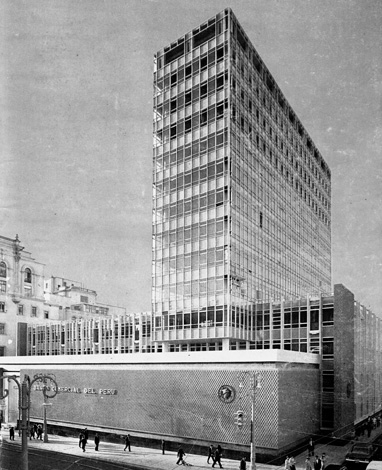
Banco Comercial del Perú Building (1965)

- Rizo Patrón Building, Lima (1939–1940)
- Church of Ancón, Ancón (1943–1944)
- Tacna-Nazarenas Building, Lima (1945–1946)
- Wilson Building, Lima (1945–1946)
- La Nacional Insurance Company Building, Lima (1947–1948)
- Ministry of Education Building, Lima (1951–1956)
- Diagonal Building, Miraflores (1952–1954)
- Pilar Church, Arequipa (1953)
- Edificio Limatambo, Lince (1953–1954; demolished, 2013)
- Banco Comercial, Lima (1962-1963; destroyed, 2000)
- Banco Wiese building, Lima (1957–1965)
- Callao Chamber of Commerce, Callao (1966–1969)
- Hotel César's, with Ricardo J. Malachowski Benavides, Miraflores (1971–1974)
- Shopping Center Motta, with Ricardo J. Malachowski Benavides, Panama (1972)
- Peruvian Steamship Company, with Ricardo J. Malachowski Benavides, Callao (1973)

== See also ==
- Architecture of Peru
