= Four Quarters March =

July 2000 protests turned riots in Lima, Peru

- Part of the Fujimorato
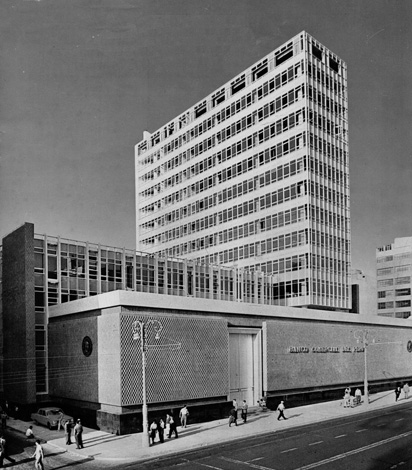
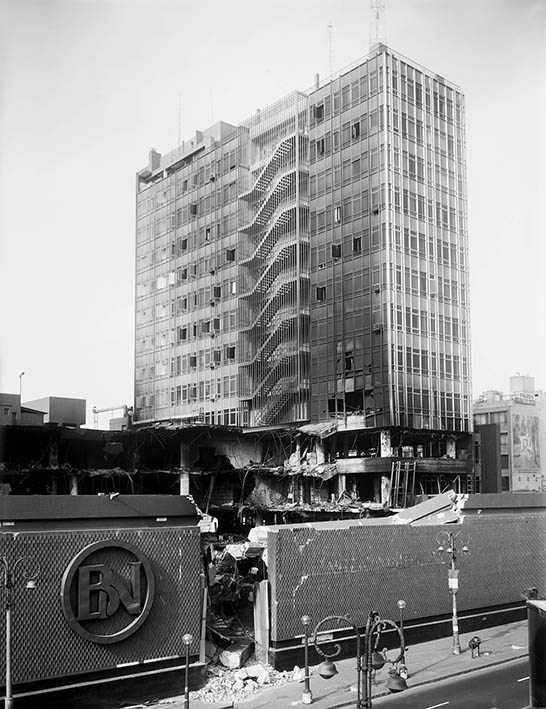
- Headquarters of the Bank of the Nation before and after the fire
- Date: July 26–28, 2000
- Location: Lima, Peru
- Caused by: Opposition to the re-election of Alberto Fujimori
- Goals: Impeachment of Fujimori
- Result: Hundreds injured and detained; Millions of dollars of material damage

Parties
Anti-Fujimorists: Perú Posible; APRA; PPC; Acción Popular	Government of Peru: National Police

Lead figures
Alejandro Toledo; Carlos Ferrero; David Waisman	Alberto Fujimori; Vladimiro Montesinos

Casualties
- Buildings destroyed: Bank of the Nation Building

The Four Quarters March or Four Suyos March (Spanish: Marcha de los Cuatro Suyos) was a popular mobilization and later riots held in Peru on July 26, 27 and 28, 2000. The march was organized in opposition of Alberto Fujimori's third consecutive election as president of Peru and its last day coincided with Fujimori's inauguration.

The protests were led by Alejandro Toledo, Carlos Ferrero and David Waisman, leaders of the Peruvian political party Perú Posible, and seconded by various social movements, anti-Fujimorist sectors, parties mostly of the left but also of social democracy, center and democratic right such as APRA, the Christian People's Party (PPC) and Acción Popular.

In the case of the PPC and APRA, who from days before, with their bases in Metropolitan Lima, were preparing the environment, they took to the streets on July 27 together with the protestors and congregated in the Paseo de los Héroes Navales until late at night of that day. The reason for this massive march was the accusation of fraud that surrounded the third consecutive election of Alberto Fujimori as president of Peru. This march, and what happened in the Plaza San Martín and its surroundings from 9 in the morning until after 5 in the afternoon represented the wearing down of the government of Alberto Fujimori.

The march's name comes from the Quechua Suyu, a term for a region from where the term Tawantinsuyu (four regions) comes from, the latter being a description of the four parts of the Inca Empire. It also represented the four points from which the protestors would march into the center of Lima.

== See also ==
- The Fall of Fujimori
- Alberto Fujimori's arrest and trial
- Lavado de bandera
- Second Four Quarters March
