= List of tallest buildings in Peru =

This list of tallest buildings in Peru ranks Peruvian skyscrapers that stand at least 95 metres (311 ft), based on standard height measurement. This includes architectural details but does not include antenna masts.

== Tallest buildings ==
Was the tallest building in Peru upon completion

Rank	Image	Name	District	City	Height (Note: It is considered the height measured from the ground level to the maximum architectural and/or structural height of the building, not including antennas, signs, machinery or any element unrelated to the design of the structure.)	Floors	Year	References
1		Torre Banco de la Nación	San Borja	Lima	140 metres (460 ft)	30	2015	
2		Edificio BBVA (Note: It was inaugurated in 1980, with a height of 82 metres. It was remodeled and reopened in 2012, incorporating a lateral tower with a spire that reaches 137 metres.)	San Isidro	Lima	137 metres (449 ft)	19	1978	
3=		Hotel Westin Libertador (Note: The height of the curtain wall is 118 metres, while the engine room officially reaches 120 metres.)	San Isidro	Lima	120 metres (390 ft)	30	2011	
3=		Begonias Tower	San Isidro	Lima	120 metres (390 ft)	26	2013	
5		Torre del Centro Cívico (Note: The height above ground level is 117 metres. However, if measured from the central plaza of the complex, it reaches 122 metres.)	Lima	Lima	117 metres (384 ft)	33	1977	
6=		Chocavento Tower	San Isidro	Lima	107 metres (351 ft)	25	2001	
6=		Torre Barlovento	San Isidro	Lima	107 metres (351 ft)	31	2015	
8=		Torre Panamá	San Isidro	Lima	105 metres (344 ft)	29	2017	
8=		Torre Forum	San Isidro	Lima	105 metres (344 ft)	30	2018	
10		Edificio MET	La Victoria	Lima	104 metres (341 ft)	37	2020	
11		Centro Ejecutivo Javier Prado 560 (Note: The official height is 102 metres. However, the structural top reaches an estimated height of 109 metres.)	San Isidro	Lima	102 metres (335 ft)	27	2016	
12=		Torre Orquídeas	San Isidro	Lima	100 metres (330 ft)	27	2016	
12=		T Tower	San Isidro	Lima	100 metres (330 ft)	25	2018	
14=		Edificio Lux	Lince	Lima	95 metres (312 ft)	33	2018	
14=		Torre Javier Prado	San Isidro	Lima	95 metres (312 ft)	27	2017	

== See also ==
- List of tallest buildings in South America
