= Lima Golf Club =

Golf club in Lima, Peru

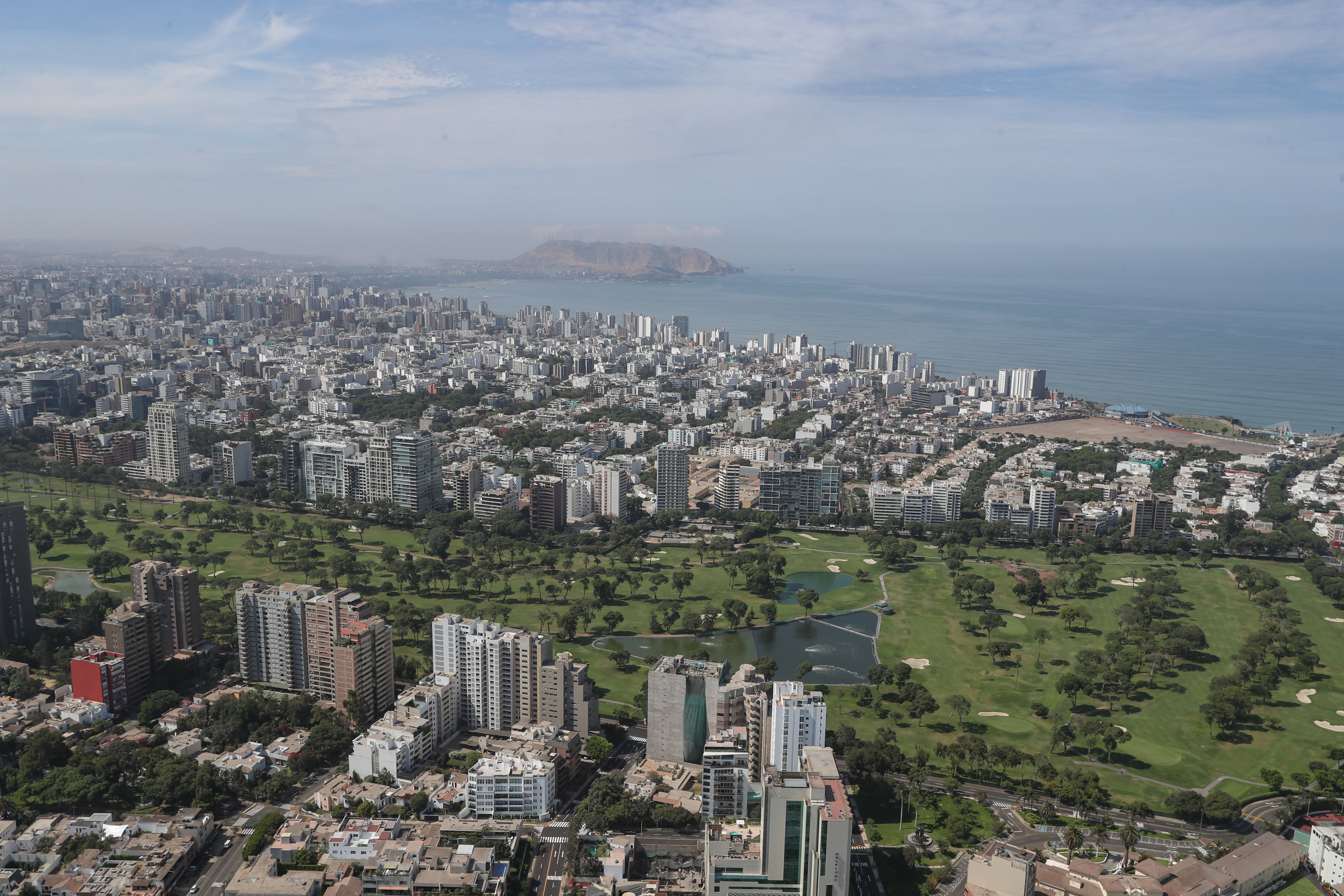
- Interactive map of Lima Golf Club

Club information
- Location: San Isidro District, Lima
- Established: May 28, 1924
- Type: Private
- Website: Official website

Lima Golf Club is a Peruvian golf club and civil association located in San Isidro District, Lima. Besides serving as a golf course, it also serves as a social club for the local British community.

== History ==
Prior to its establishment, a golf course existed in the Chucuito neighbourhood of Callao until 1915, when its premises moved to the Hippodrome of Santa Beatriz. After a search by local Britons—some of them members of the city's Phoenix Club—for an appropriate site the year prior, the club was officially founded on May 28, 1924, after member Arturo Porras convinced the Moreyra Paz Soldán family of selling their terrain, then in the process of becoming the "Conde de San Isidro" neighbourhood.

The club's meeting house was built in 1943, at Camino Real Avenue, prior to which its members met at the nearby Country Club Lima Hotel. It is a member of the Peruvian Golf Federation.

The club will host the 2026 Latin America Amateur Championship (LAAC). In 2024, it hosted the Women's Amateur Latin America (WALA).

== See also ==
- Country Club Lima Hotel
- El Olivar, Peru
