= Los Hang Ten's =

Peruvian rock band

Los Hang Ten's was a Peruvian rock band formed in 1964, originally from the San Isidro District in the country's capital Lima, from which the first so-called rock "supergroup" in that country's music history,Traffic Sound drew a few of its original members and, through them and the participation of four other members of two additional bands, "Los Mad's" and "Los Drags" resulted in the final idea regarding the creation of the aforementioned "super group",

== Beginnings ==
In late June 1964, a number of the more rock music-inclined members of the Christian Brothers' "Santa María School" student body, specifically a few of those amongst them attending the 9th grade, decided to create a rock band in order to entertain their friends and schoolmates, primarily at school events and parties. The name of the band, "Los Hang Ten's" – a direct derivative of Hang Ten, a complex surfing manoeuver, but keeping the article "Los", in Spanish, (as opposed to the English "The") –, was chosen by consensus by the original group members, most of whom were surf, as well as music aficionados in their remaining free time.

Initially, the group had the brothers José (b. Lima, 1950-), and Freddy (b. Lima, 1952-) Rizo-Patrón Buckley playing lead and rhythm guitar, respectively (their mother a US national from Boston, their father a business man who was the great-great grand son of Antonio Miguel Aráoz Usandivaras, the Argentine Consul General in Lima). In the drums, was the then future Minister of Justice and Foreign Affairs of Perú – as well as President of the Inter-American Court of Human Rights –, Diego García Sayán Larrabure (b.New York, NY, 1950-). Diego was the youngest son of Dr. Enrique García Sayán, Foreign Minister of Peru from 1946 to 1948 and the co-author, with Pres. Jose Luis Bustamante y Rivero, (1894–1989) who was later President of the International Court of Justice), of the so-called 200 Mile Territorial Sea Limit Doctrine.

The line-up was completed with schoolmates Ramón de Orbegoso Elejalde, who played 2nd rhythm guitar (b. Lima, 1952-), himself the great.grand son of Peruvian President Luis José de Orbegoso, and finally by Felipe Larrabure Aramburú (b. Lima, 1950-), who was García Sayán's first cousin, on lead vocals. As is the case with Garcia-Sayan, the latter on his mother's side, Felipe is, on his father's side, both the great grand son of Peruvian President of the Council of Ministers and Foreign Minister Eugenio Larrabure y Unanue, as well as the great great great grand son of one of Peru's earliest dignataries, the first President of the Government after independence, Minister of Finance, and Foreign Minister, José Hipólito Unanue y Pavón

A few weeks after, another schoolmate, future music impresario Arturo Rodrigo Santistevan (b. Lima, 1949-d.Lima, 2019), joined the group by playing the tambourine, as well as, on the occasion, did another school friend, the future front man for Traffic Sound, then DJ and businessman, Manuel Sanguinetti Orlandi (b. Lima, 1950), who sang several songs with Larrabure, by providing back-up vocals to each other, in alternance.

== Influences ==
The group was influenced by the arrival of the so-called "British Invasion", which had taken over the United States by storm, the latter a country most of their members had visited on either school-sponsored, family, or personal vacation trips, the two previous summers.

Most notably, it was the sound of the UK group The Kinks, led by the Davies brothers, Dave and Ray, that impressed them the most, which led them into performing covers of almost their entire set of hits, ranging from rockers like "You really got me", "Till the end of the day" and "All day and all of the night", to the blues infested "Com'on now", or power ballads like "Baby, where have all the good times gone" and "Tired of waiting for you".

In the next two years, classics from The Young Rascals, Donovan and the Rolling Stones became a part of their repertoire, including the latter group's first two big US and UK hits, "Get off my cloud" and "Time is on my side" and starting in the summer of 1965, "Satisfaction". The Beatles, by then the world's most successful artists, were also influential, although it was mostly covers they had done themselves of early US rockers, like Chuck Berry's "Rock and Roll Music", which ended up becoming part of "Los Hang Ten's" play list.

In their manner of dress, at least in its early formative stage, the group frequently wore attire consisting of a turtleneck, usually in light blue and white horizontal stripes, under dark suits.

== Recording ==
After developing a fan base consisting of the families and friends of their schoolmates, and of teens who did not attend "Santa Maria" School but who had become their followers and, soon after playing live in several important festivals, executives at "Odeon", then one of the major Peruvian record labels, suggested that they record a single, which soon materialized with their recording of "Till the end of the day", their favorite Kinks composition, as the "A" side, and a blistering, unusual version of Nancy Sinatra's then massive worldwide hit, "These boots are made for walking", on the flip side.

Both sides of the single (the 45 RPM, Odeon 45–9671, was released in November 1966), drew fair airplay, mostly in AM stations, as was the custom in Peru's radio broadcasting, particularly insofar as Rock-oriented music in the mid-sixties is concerned. Conversely, because "Odeon" released only a relatively small print, consisting of 500 copies, the single has become with the passing of time, a coveted music memorabilia item for both Peruvian and Latin American early rock aficionados alike. The musicians who played on that recording were the original 5 members, plus Rodrigo, who played the tambourine and left the group, soon after.

== Changes, ulterior disbandment and legacy ==
In the spring of 1967, Freddy Rizo-Patrón left "Los Hang Ten's" to create another band, a super-group, (Traffic Sound). He contacted Sanguinetti to sing lead, as well as dovetailed his efforts with those made simultaneously by the members of two other bands, namely lead guitarist Guillermo (Willito) Barclay Ricketts (b.Lima, 1948-) himself the nephew on his mother's side of Peru's first Cardinal Juan Landazuri Ricketts ( born in Arequipa in 1913 as Guillermo Eduardo Landázuri Ricketts, d. Lima, 1997), then bass man Guillermo (Willy) Thorne Valega (b. Lima, 1950–d. Lima 2019, the grandson of banking executive Rollin Andres Avelino Thorne Sologuren), drummer Luis (Lucho) Nevares and, finally. sax player Jean Pierre Magnet Vargas Prada (b. Lima, 1949-) their combined efforts, thus leading to the final creation of Traffic Sound.

In the meantime, the "Los Hang Ten's" line-up was immediately re-arranged, as original 2nd rhythm guitar player de Orbegoso switched to lead guitar, thus replacing José Rizo-Patron, who also chose not to continue, opting instead to dedicate his time fully to his university studies. At the same time, another schoolmate, Jaime Sabal Saba (b. Lima, 1951-) was added to play bass Comversely, a former child schoolmate, – who by then was attending another high school, Juan Geronimo de Aliaga Fernandini (b. Lima, 1951-), the direct descendant, on his father´s side, of Spanish Conquistador Geronimo de Aliaga and the nephew, on his mother´s, of the first ever female Mayor of Lima, Peruvian mining heiress Anita Fernandini de Naranjo, was then promptly recruited to play the 1st rhythm guitar position left vacant by Freddy Rizo Patron once he joined "Traffic Sound".

Finally, in mid 1967, drummer Garcia-Sayan recruited his close fiend and future UN official, as well as Nicaraguan Ambassador to Brazil and Peru Guillermo Felipe Perez-Arguello (born Lima, 1950-), to sing some additional material, mainly of early rock and R&B provenance. He is the nephew on his father's side of the fifth Secretary-General of the United Nations and also President of the Council of Ministers and Foreign Minister of Perú Javier Pérez de Cuellar (1920-2020) and, on his mother side, the oldest great grandson of the Woman of the Americas, 1959 Nicaraguan chapter laureate Doña Angélica Balladares Montealegre de Arguello Vargas (1872-1973)

One of Pérez-Argüello's school mates while attending a boarding school in Chosica, a town located an hour from Lima, Jesús Emmanuel Arturo Acha Martinez, a then 14-year-old high school senior of Argentinian and Spanish extraction who was the week-end guest of the Spanish businessman Tomas Datorre Compes, in turn a neighbor of the Garcia Sayan's family estate, attended in late 1967 at least one of their practice runs,

Until about February 1968, "Los Hang Ten's" continued playing, mostly at week-end festivals and ad hoc venues but, with their college and university education just around the corner, they all parted along different ways, some taking up higher studies in North America and Europe.

While the remaining band members all attended Peruvian universities, one of them in particular, Juan Geronimo de Aliaga, stayed the course for the next two years, eventually playing rhythm guitar for The Beatnicks, a rock ensemble fronted by Andres and Ramon Carrillo Valdes, the latter a future Peruvian and UN diplomat who is currently the Director of the Nebrija University Foundation in Madrid, Spain.
