= Country Club Lima Hotel =

Hotel in Peru

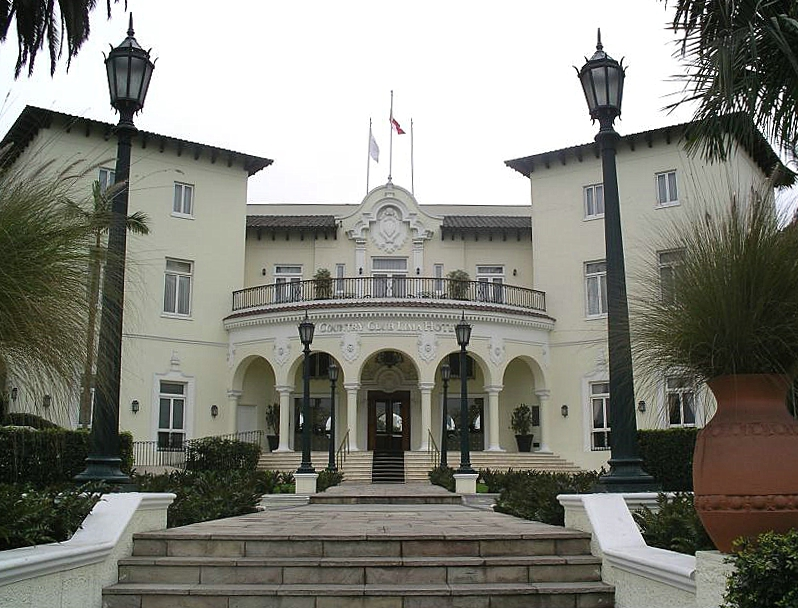
- Interactive map of the Country Club Lima Hotel area

General information
- Architectural style: Californian colonial
- Location: Ca. Los Eucaliptos 590
- Construction started: August 1925
- Inaugurated: February 8, 1927

Design and construction
- Architect: T.J. O'Brien

Website
- www.countryclublimahotel.com

The Country Club Lima Hotel is a five-star hotel in San Isidro District, Lima, Peru. It was inaugurated on February 8, 1927, as the most exclusive country club in Lima before being reorganised as a hotel. It is part of the Cultural heritage of Peru.

The hotel has housed a number of important personalities of the 20th century, including the Duke of Windsor and his wife, French President Charles de Gaulle, U.S. President Richard Nixon, writer Ernest Hemingway, actors Ava Gardner and John Wayne, musician Mick Jagger, among others.

== History ==
In 1925 the Sociedad Anónima Propietaria del Country Club was formed with a capital of Lp. 150,000, with the purpose of building developing the adjoining area of 1,300,000 m^{2} acquired from the Conde de San Isidro, Lobatón, Matalechuzas and Orrantia estates. The sale of the land was calculated at S/. 15 per urbanised m^{2} to reinvest part of the profits in building's construction.

In 1926 Lima Country Club was founded, an independent company from the previous one, which contracted the preparation of the architectural project for the club's premises. The project's execution was entrusted to the American architect T.J. O'Brien, who completed the project and inspected the construction, whose materials were imported from the United States and Great Britain.

The premises were inaugurated on Sunday, February 8, 1927, by President Augusto B. Leguía. There was a lunch for the President, his Cabinet of Ministers and a series of political, intellectual and artistic personalities of the city. Up until the 1970s, it was the meeting point for the Peruvian elite and the city's British colony, also receiving important guests from other countries, such as the adbicated Duke of Windsor and his wife, French President Charles de Gaulle, U.S. writer Ernest Hemingway, and actress Ava Gardner, among others.

After being negatively affected during the economic crisis of the 1980s, it was acquired by the Consorcio Inmobiliario Los Portales and ICA in 1996, who invested in the hotel's renovation, being reinaugurated on July 21, 1998. It was subsequently declared part of the Cultural heritage of Peru by the Ministry of Culture and the National Institute of Culture.

It was again renovated from 2015 to 2017. In 2020, due to the COVID-19 pandemic in Peru, the hotel remained open as it adopted the biosecurity measures mandated by the Peruvian government.

The hotel restaurant, Perroquet, has won first place for "Best Hotel Restaurant" in several international awards for several years. The hotel's traditional English bar is recognized for having one of the best pisco sours in the city, and in 2012, 2013 and 2022 it was awarded as the best bar in Lima according to the SUMMUM awards.

== In popular culture ==
The hotel is featured in two novels by Alfredo Bryce, Un mundo para Julius and No me esperen en abril, being a prominent part of the latter's story.

Peruvian saxophonist Jean Pierre Magnet, member of Traffic Sound, started his career in the club.

== See also ==
- Embassy of China, Lima, located behind the hotel.
- Delfines Hotel & Convention Center, located next to the hotel.
