= Begonias Tower =

Building in Lima, Peru

Coordinates: 12.0920905°S 77.0261471°W

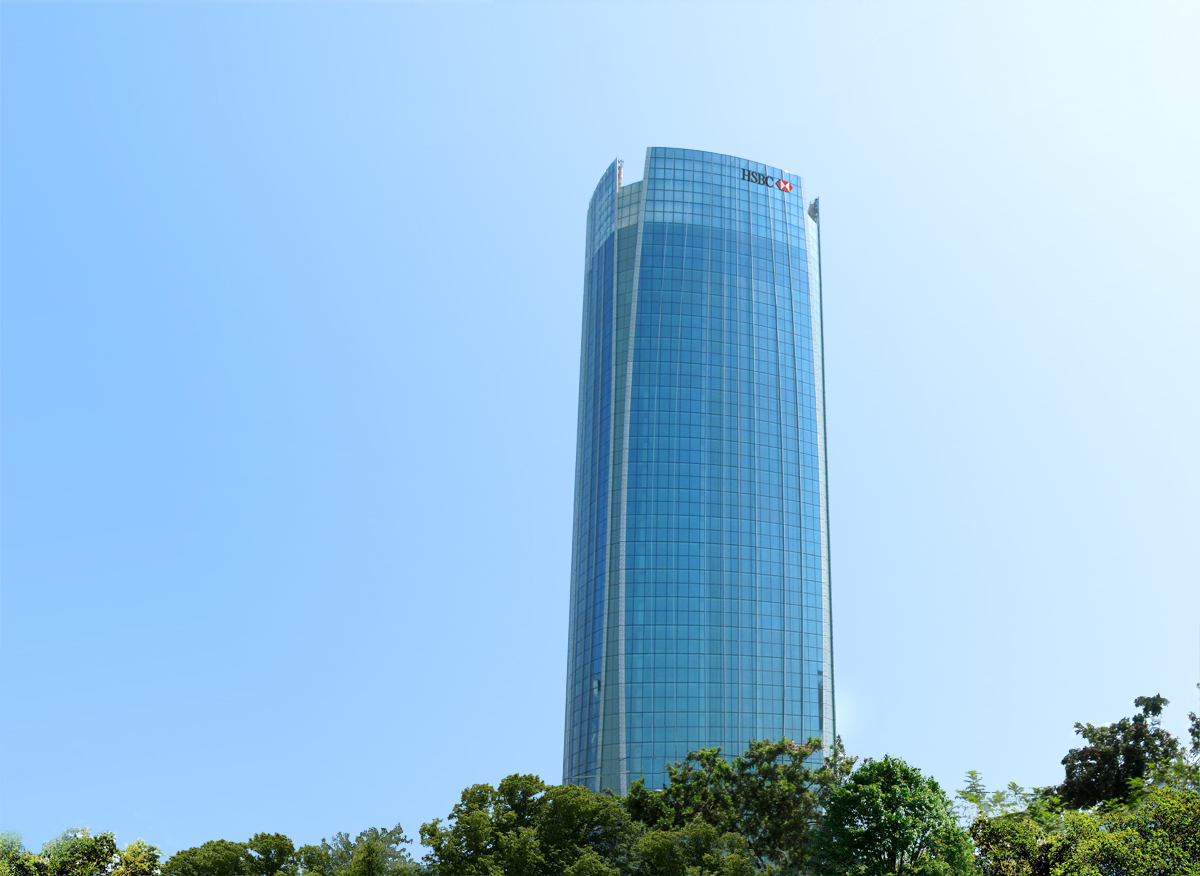
- Interactive map of the Begonias Tower area

General information
- Inaugurated: 2013
- Cost: US$ 50 million
- Owner: Grupo Brescia

Height
- Height: 120 m

Technical details
- Floor count: 26

Design and construction
- Architect: Bernardo Fort Brescia
- Main contractor: Arquitectonica

Begonias Tower, also known as the HSBC Tower, is a skyscraper located in San Isidro District, Lima. It serves as the main headquarters of HSBC Perú, a subsidiary of British banking company HSBC.

== Description ==
It is owned by the Brescia Group, as is the Banco Continental Building. It houses a group of offices including those of Compañía de Minas Buenaventura, McKinsey & Company, Huawei, among others. Its construction finished in 2013. It has a height of 120 metres, 26 floors with 8 basements.

== See also ==
- The Westin Lima Hotel & Convention Center, located across the street
