= Chocavento Tower =

Coordinates: 12.0976°S 77.0207°W

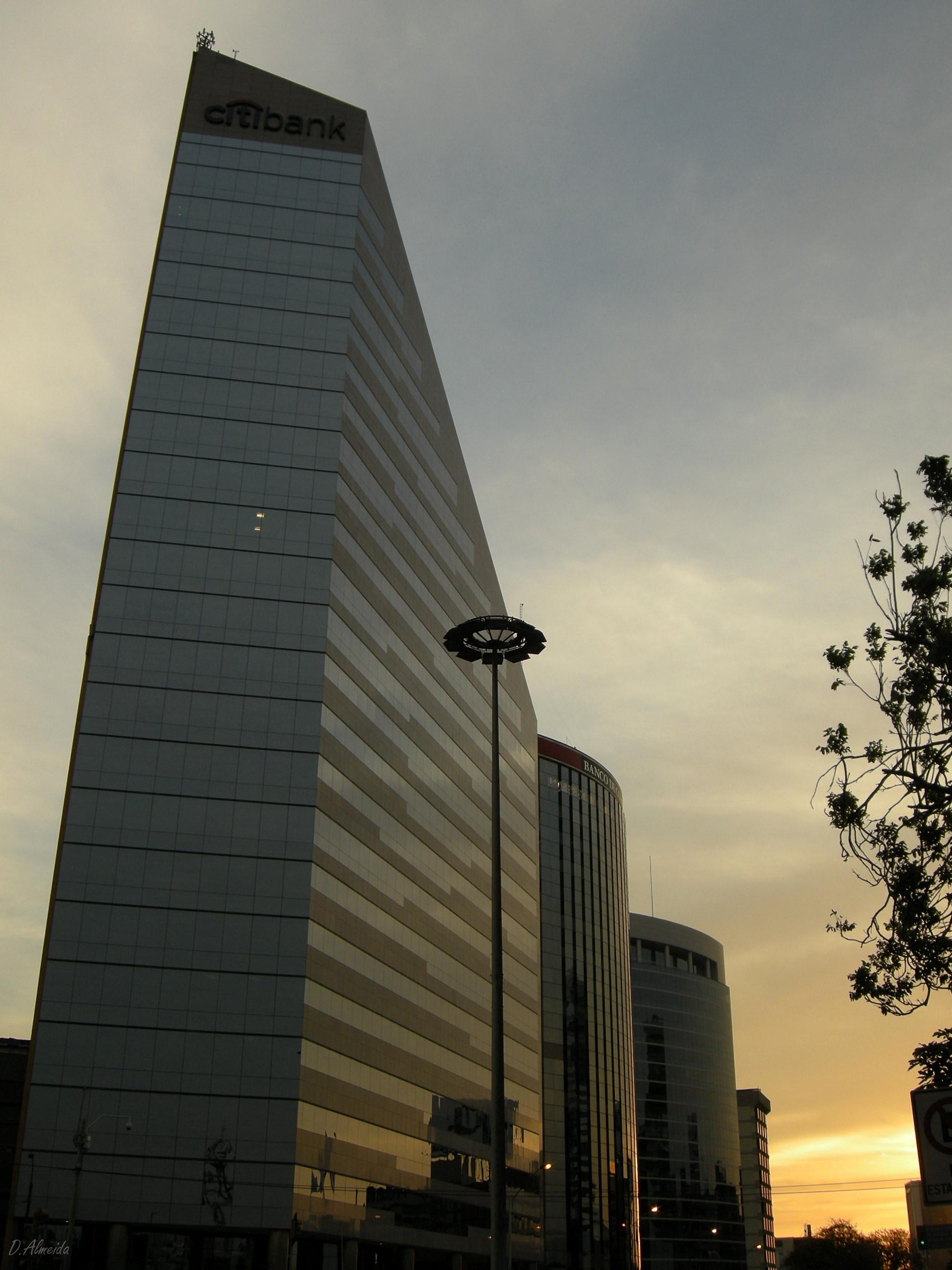
- Interactive map of the Chocavento Tower area

General information
- Status: Completed
- Type: Office
- Location: Lima, Peru
- Completed: 2001
- Cost: $15.3 million

Height
- Roof: 107 m (351 ft)

Technical details
- Floor count: 25

Design and construction
- Architect: Diego Sánchez Gálvez
- Structural engineer: Hans Hollein
- Main contractor: Cosapi

The Chocavento Tower (Edificio Chocavento) is a high-rise office building located in the San Isidro district of Lima, Peru, built in 2001. At a height of 107 meters, is the third highest building in Peru, surpassed by Lima Civic Center at 109 meters, the Westin Libertador Hotel at 120 meters and the Banco Continental (BBVA) Building at 132 meters. The Chocavento building has 25 storeys above ground and five below ground. Its construction cost US$15.3 million.
