= Edificio BBVA =

Building in Lima, Peru

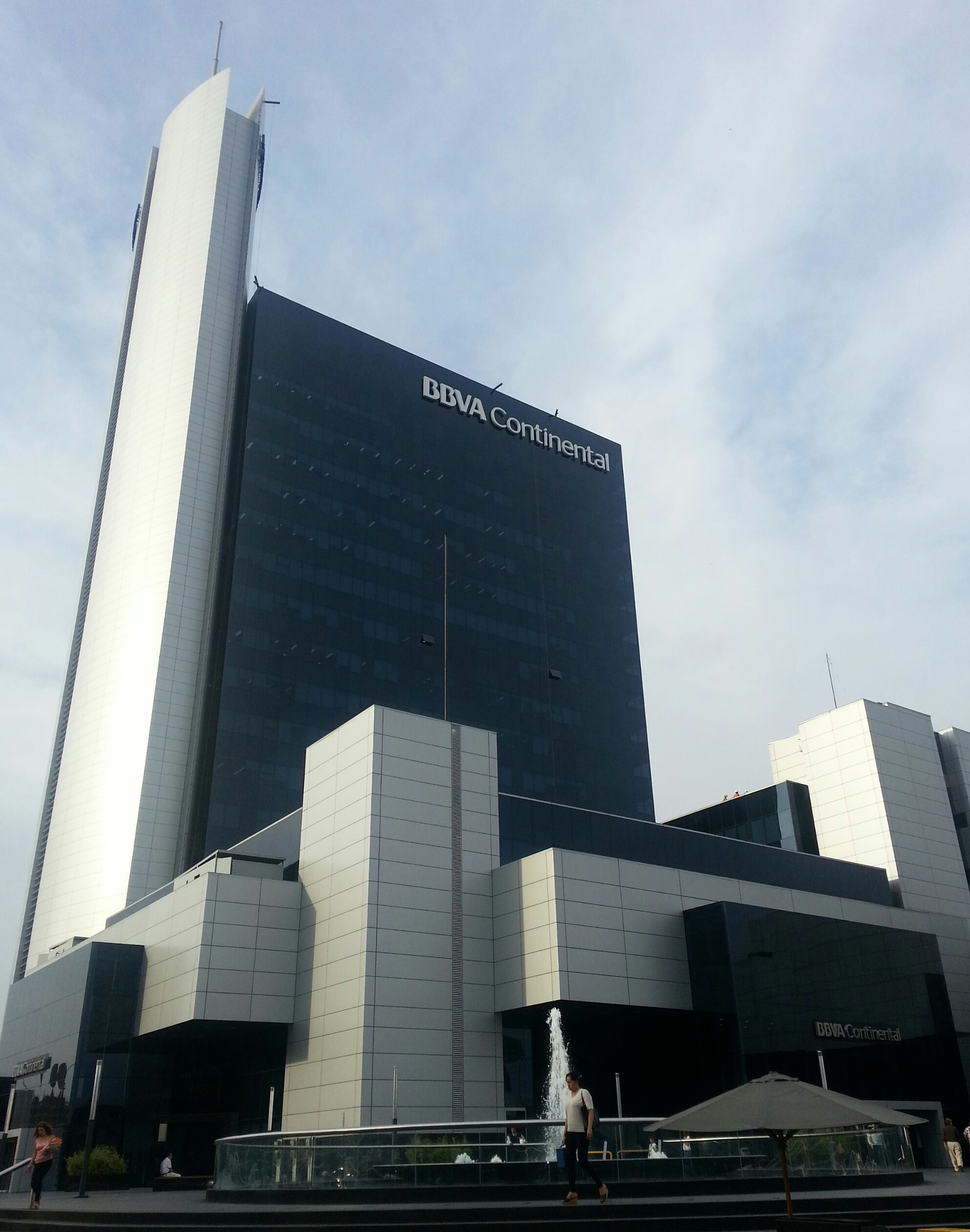
- Interactive map of the Edificio BBVA area

General information
- Location: Rep. de Panamá 3055
- Year built: 1979–1981
- Inaugurated: 1981
- Height: 137 m

Technical details
- Floor count: 19
- Floor area: 64,860 m^{2}

Design and construction
- Architects: Víctor Smirnoff, Víctor Ramírez, José Kanashiro

The BBVA Building, also known as the Banco Continental Building, is a building located in Republic of Panama Avenue 3055, in San Isidro District, Lima. The second tallest building in Peru, it serves as the main headquarters of BBVA Perú, a subsidiary of Spanish financial company Banco Bilbao Vizcaya Argentaria (BBVA).

== History ==
The building was designed by architects Víctor Smirnoff, Víctor Ramírez and José Kanashiro. Construction started in 1979, with the building being inaugurated in 1981. The building's orange façade was remodeled from 2011 to 2012, and a tower with an antenna was erected next to the building at the same time.

== See also ==
- Torre Banco de la Nación

== Gallery ==
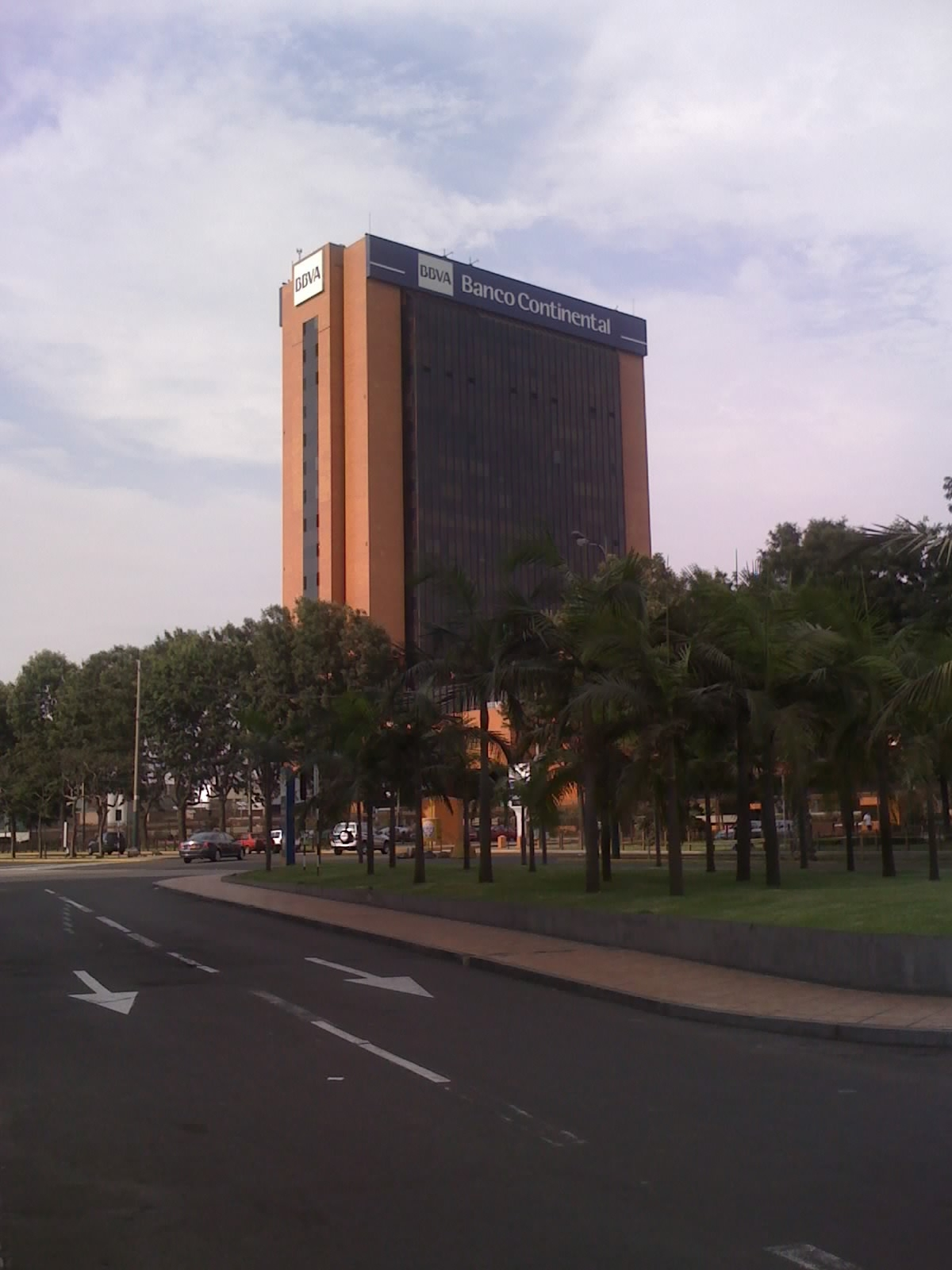
The building's former façade

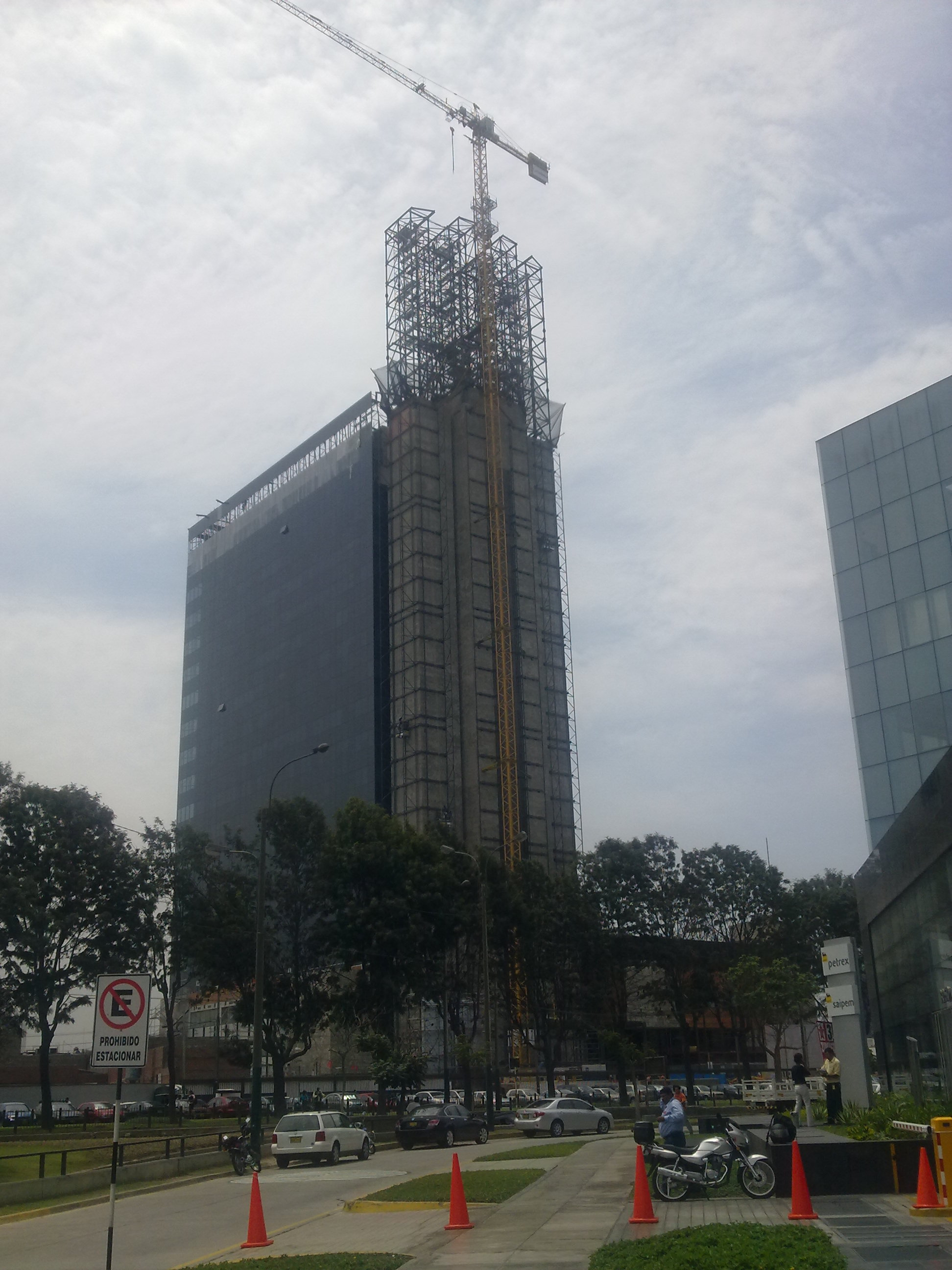
The building being remodeled in 2011

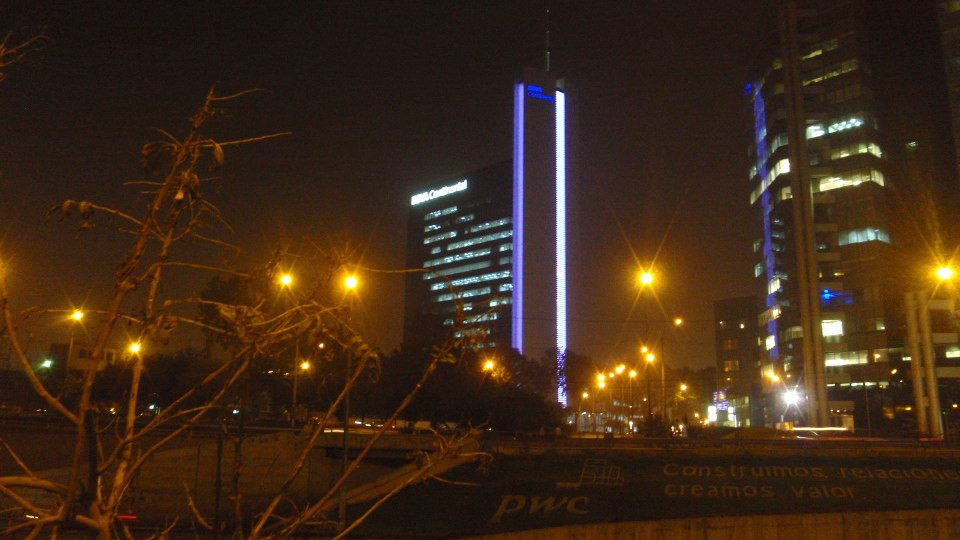
The building at night
