= Delfines Hotel & Convention Center =

Hotel in Peru

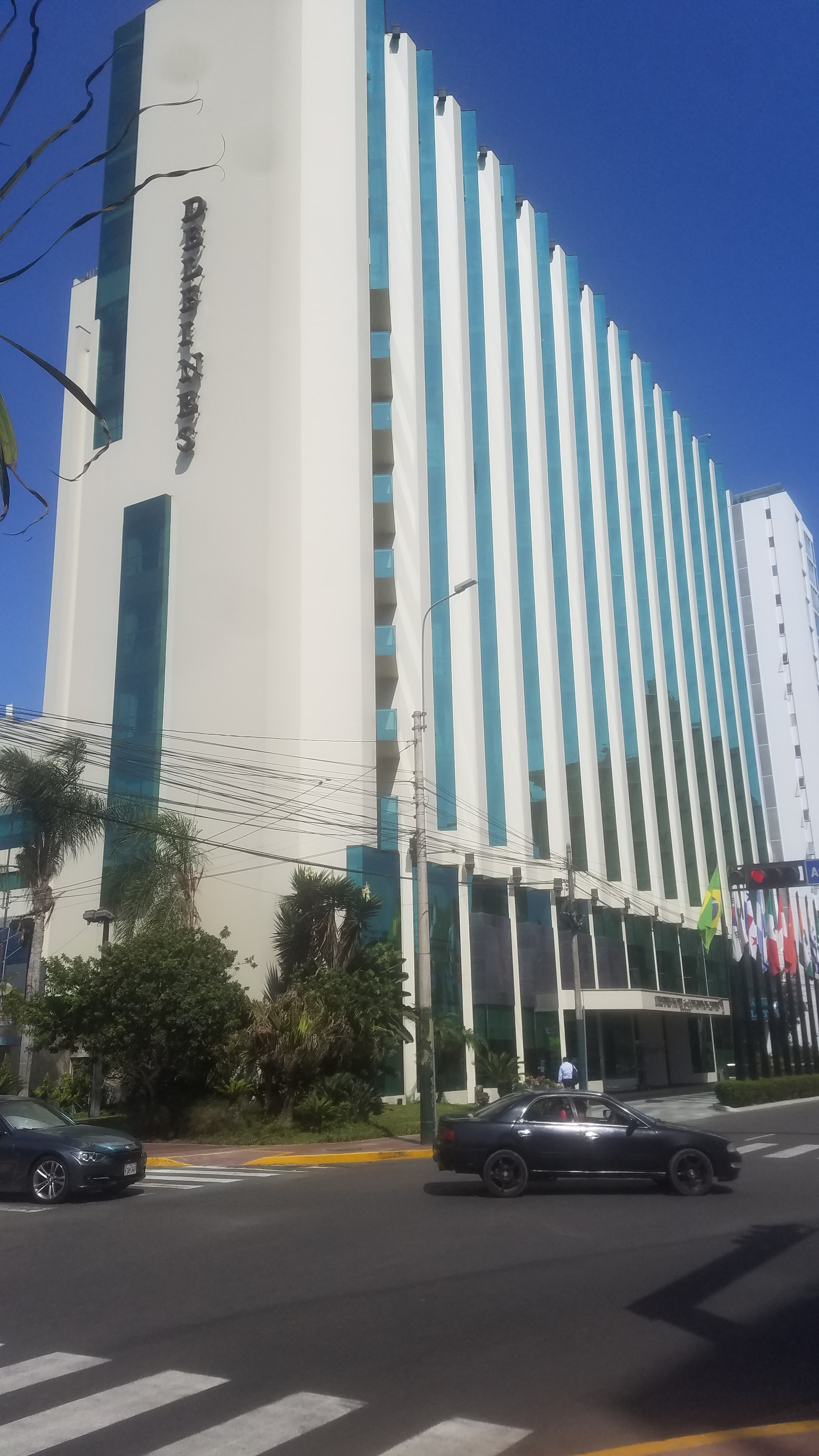
- Interactive map of the Delfines Hotel & Convention Center area

General information
- Location: Calle Los Eucaliptos 555
- Opened: July 15, 1997
- Owner: Jacques Levy Calvo

Technical details
- Floor count: 14

Other information
- Number of rooms: 206

The Delfines Hotel & Convention Center, formerly known as the Delfines Hotel & Casino and commonly known as the Hotel Los Delfines, is a five-star hotel in San Isidro District, Lima, Peru. From its opening in 1997 until 2010, the hotel was best known for its two bottlenose dolphins, Yaku and Wayra, who gave the hotel its name.

== History ==
The hotel, owned by Jacques Levy Calvo—a Peruvian businessman and banker of French-Jewish descent—and his siblings, opened on July 15, 1997, intended to attract foreign businessmen visiting the city. Its name came from the two dolphins that were trained by Levy's (then) wife, María Elena Llanos. At the time of its opening, it was the first hotel able to host more than 1,000 in an event hall.

In 2008, the hotel's "Salón Mediterráneo" event hall was one of the locations where meetings of that year's summit of the Asia-Pacific Economic Cooperation were held.

=== Dolphins ===
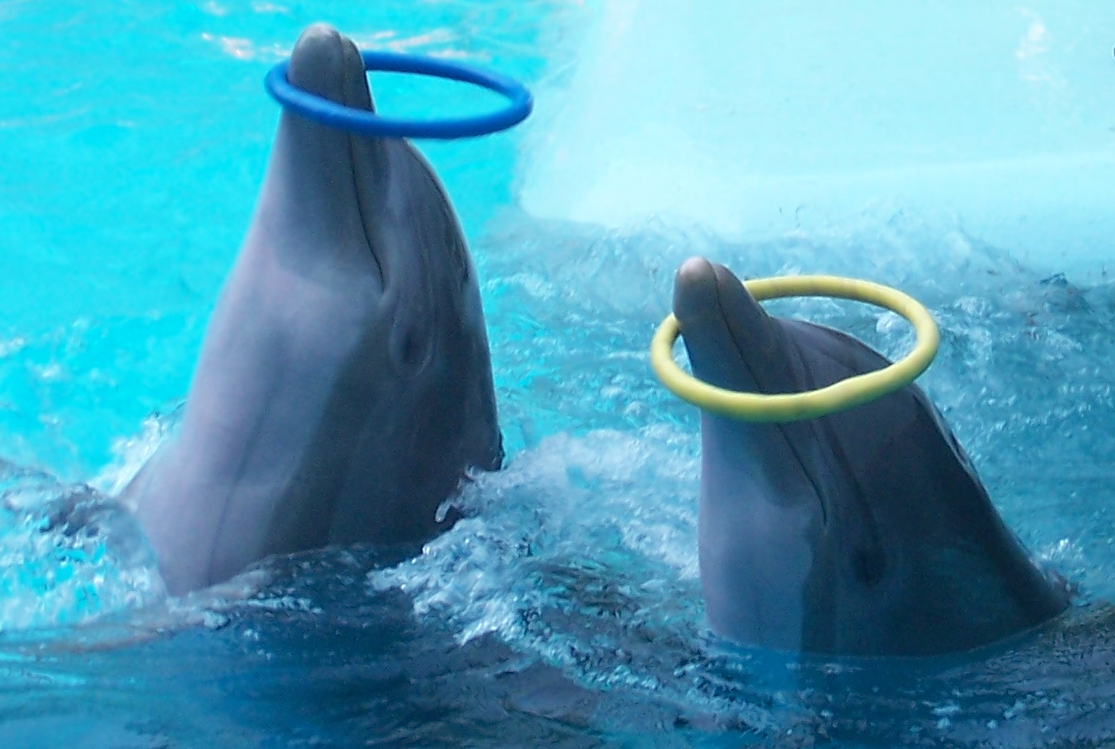
The dolphins performing in 2007.

Yaku (born c. 1988) and Wayra (born c. 1992) are two male and female bottlenose dolphins that served as the hotel's namesake and main attraction from 1997 to 2010. Born off the coasts of Cuba, they were smuggled to Mexico, where they became known as "Yoyo" and "Laly" until their arrival to Peru, where they were moved to the hotel and renamed to the Quechua words for "water" and "air", respectively.

The dolphins' arrival to Peru in 1997 after their purchase the year before led to an immediate response by animal welfare groups in the country, with the Judiciary of Peru ruling in favour of the hotel, concluding that the pool where they were kept was built prior to the creation of any regulations regarding the maintenance of captive dolphins. Consequently, the dolphins remained in the hotel, accessible to its guests and reportedly exposed to the show lights and street noise.

In 2010, both dolphins were moved from the hotel to another pool in a hill near La Herradura, a beach in Chorrillos District. The new site's poor conditions were condemned by local media, with its small size (12 m in diameter and 3.5 m deep) being highlighted. All visits ceased to be allowed in 2011.

During the entirety of her captivity, Wayra became pregnant four times with ultimately no calf surviving due to the conditions they lived in. The one calf she gave birth to is alleged to have been crushed by her due to the small size of the hotel pool.

Both dolphins were reportedly moved to Dolphin Cove Jamaica, a dolphinarium in Jamaica, on July 18, 2014. These claims have since been disputed, however, by former caretaker Ursula Behr, who was once denied a visit to the dolphins in June 2014. María Elena Llanos, Levy's ex-wife, also denounced the lack of transparency and possible abuse in the animals' transport, highlighting that Yaku's cardiac issues could be fatal if not treated properly.

== See also ==
- Country Club Lima Hotel, located next to the hotel
