= Traffic Sound =

Peruvian rock band

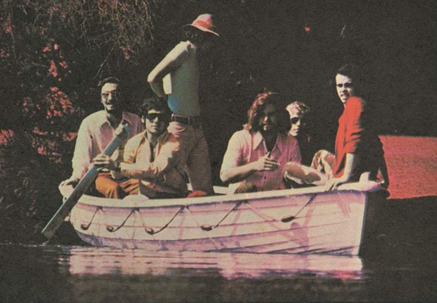
- Traffic Sound

Background information
- Origin: Peru
- Genres: Peruvian rock, folk rock, psychedelic rock, Latin rock
- Years active: 1967–1972 (Reunions: 1993)
- Labels: MAG Records; SONO RADIO Records
- Past members: Manuel Sanguinetti; Jean Pierre Magnet; Willy Thorne (musician); Willy Barclay; Freddy Rizo Patrón; Luis Nevares

Traffic Sound was a Peruvian rock band founded in 1967 by Manuel Sanguinetti Orlandi (vocals, b. 1950-), Freddy Rizo-Patrón Buckley (rhythm guitar, b.1952-), Jean Pierre Magnet Vargas Prada (sax, b. 1949-); Guillermo "Willito" Barclay Ricketts (lead guitar b.1948-) himself the nephew on his mother's side of Peru's first Cardinal Juan Landazuri Ricketts ( born in Arequipa in 1913 as Guillermo Eduardo Landázuri Ricketts, d. Lima, 1997); Willy Thorne Valega (bass, b. 1950-d. 2019), grandson of noted banker and industrialist Rollin Andrés Avelino Thorne Sologuren, and Luis "Lucho" Nevares (drums, b-1950-). Manuel and Freddy had met in school and played in Los Hang Ten's, with the latter and his older brother Jose originally coming up with the idea of founding "Traffic Sound". Simultaneously, Magnet joined "Los Drags" as Barclay and Thorne played in "Los Mad's" with Nevares and, a while later, Thorne again playing in the short-lived (1965-66) Peruvian band "Ides of March" (not to be confused with the US band founded in 1966 The Ides of March). As noted earlier, they all met in the summer of 1967 and created Traffic Sound

The name was chosen because of their penchant for a traffic light, placed as a souvenir in the attic of the Rizo-Patróns house where they held their practices after a wild night in Lima.

== Albums ==
After a year of continued rehearsals and private shows and with the guidance of their manager, Jorge Manuel Vegas (b. Iquitos, Peru, December 20, 1944, d. Oslo, Norway April 17, 1987 ), the band tried their luck at Peruvian psychedelic emporium The Tiffany with great success and recorded his first album "A Bailar Go Go" in 1968 with label MAG. It contained versions of songs by The Doors, Cream, Jimi Hendrix, Iron Butterfly and The Animals. In later albums they included their own music with a fusion of Andean and Afro-Latin sounds. They held gigs in Peru, Chile, Argentina and Brazil.

Their second album "Virgin" (1969), all original material contains Peruvian Psychedelia hit, "Meshkalina". The lyrics referenced to the Inca civilization of Peru:

In 1970, Traffic Sound recorded another LP named "Traffic Sound" (a.k.a. III, or Tibet's Suzette), in which they blended psychedelia spirit with an Andean folk sound, and more closely approached progressive rock.

In 1971 Braniff International Airways organized the first South American tour of a Peruvian band, and Traffic Sound was well received in demanding markets such as Argentina and Brazil.

After the tour they switched to bigger label Sono Radio and released four singles. At this point Willy Thorne left the band and was replaced by Miguel Angel Ruiz Orbegoso, (aka, Zulu) on bass and keyboards, with whom they recorded their last LP, "Lux". During a strike at Sono Radio the master tapes disappeared and were only found in 1996. This album is different to the previous, the Andean influence is more evident and some political concerns were expressed.

The band held a memorable concert at the Teatro Segura in Lima together with the Contemporary Orchestra of Peruvian jazz pianist Jaime Delgado Aparicio in 1971 and disbanded in 1972.

== Aftermath ==
Saxophonist Jean Pierre Magnet began a successful solo career.

In 1973, bassist/keyboardist Zulu was asked by IEMPSA to record his own album (label ODEON). After three releases, a mention in Billboard magazine and his music being heard among much of Latin America and the Latin market in New York, he retired because of a devoted desire for preaching the Bible.

Singer Manuel Sanguinetti founded Radio Doble Nueve, Peru's rock radio station, in 1979.

In 1993, Traffic Sound members got together again for a concert at Muelle Uno, Miraflores, and launched new versions of their old hits, a London remasterization CD of "Virgin" for Europe. Since 2005 they have met several times (at Hotel Los Delfines, Asia beach and The Dragon Racing Club of Punta Hermosa). Repsychled Records has since re-released "Virgin".

Two of their songs, "Lux" and "Yesterday's Game" were used in episodes of American TV series Life on Mars.

They returned in 2005. The presentations were at luxurious clubs and hotels in Lima (Hotel Los Delfines, Asia, Club de Regatas Lima and El Dragon de Punta Hermosa).

Then, from 2015 thru 2017, the group was reunited again with Willy Barclay Jr. on second guitar and Zulu on bass at the "Teatro Peruano Japonés", Lima, Peru, to a full house. They then played at "Teatro Fénix", Arequipa, and at the "Gran Teatro Nacional", Lima.

Their song “You Got To Be Sure!” was used in the end credits of Plur1bus Season 1 Episode 8, the Vince Gilligan 2025 television series on Apple TV.

== Discography ==
Albums

- A Bailar Go Go (1968)
- Virgin (1969)
- Traffic Sound, a.k.a. III, a.k.a. Tibet's Suzettes (1971)
- Lux (1971)
- Yellow Sea Years (2005)
- Greatest Hits (2005)

Singles

- Sky Pilot-Fire (1968)
- You Got Me Floating-Sueño (1968)
- I'm So Glad-Destruction (1968)
- La Camita-You Got To Be Sure (1971)
- Suavecito-Solos (1971)
