= La Herradura, Lima =

Beach in Peru

Coordinates: 12.1742°S 77.0337°W

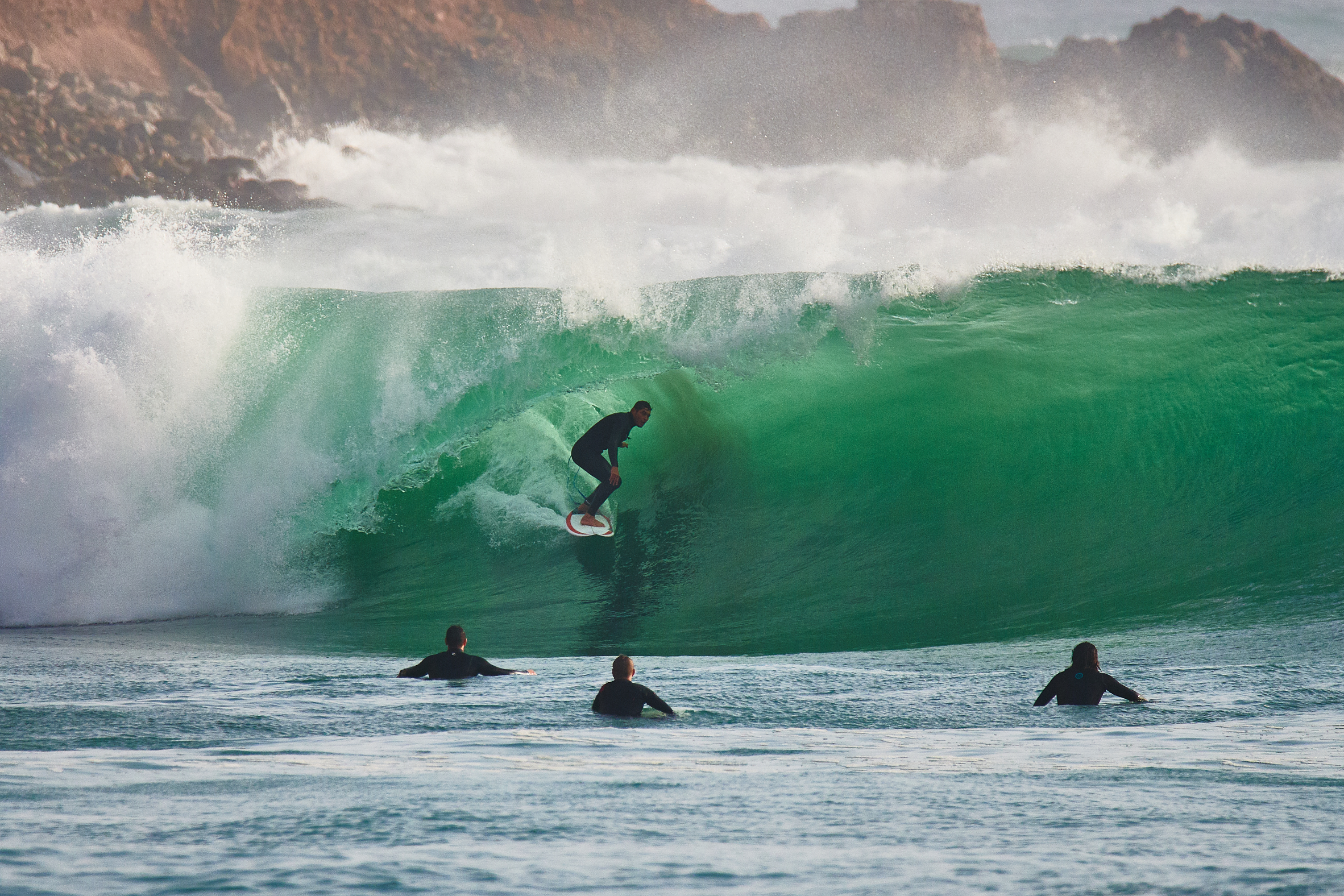
Surfers at the beach.

La Herradura is a beach located in the Chorrillos District of Lima, Peru. It has been used as a balneario since the beginning of the 20th century and for surfing since the 1960s. Until the 1980s it was one of the most popular beaches in Lima, visited especially by the city's wealthy families. The construction of the road to La Chira beach changed the configuration of the beach and the shore, which was previously sandy, was filled with stones.

Since December 28, 2016, La Herradura has been part of the National Reef Registry (RENARO), a registry of protected waves in the country covered by the law on the preservation of reefs appropriate for sports (law no. 27280).

== Overview ==
La Herradura is located in a place that receives a greater number of hours of sunshine per year compared to the rest of the balnearios in Lima. At the beginning of the 20th century, it had a sandy shore, which differentiated it from other spas on the nascent Costa Verde with stones or boulders. Since the construction of the road to La Chira in the 1980s, dynamite blasting changed the configuration of the beach and the shore was filled with stones.

=== Surf activities ===
The wave is strong, long and breaks to the left with 3 sections: El Point, La Segunda and La Tercera. The waves can reach up to 4 metres high. It is not suitable for beginners.

Since the 1960s the beach has been used for surfing. There are two versions about the first surf session on the beach. According to Magoo de la Rosa, in 1962 or 1963 the surfer Raúl Risso entered the sea alone to test the waves. According to Óscar Tramontana Figallo, the first session occurred in 1965 when five surfers entered: Fernando Arrarte, the brothers Francisco and Carlos Aramburu, Manolo Mendizábal and Felipe Pomar.

==== Championship ====
Since 2008, the Quiksilver Pro Copa Ripley surf championship has been held on the beach, later called Quiksilver Pro La Herradura and in 2017 King of La Herradura. In addition to rewarding the most outstanding surfers, the championship aims to raise awareness to the population about the importance of conserving Peruvian reefs.

== History ==
La Herradura beach has been used as a balneario since 1908. With the construction of the La Herradura tunnel in 1910, the tram of the National Electric Tram Company (CNET) had La Herradura beach as the end point of its route. At the end of 1912, the company went bankrupt and the trams stopped running. The only way to access the place since then was on foot or with a vehicle.

In 1937 the El Suizo restaurant was built. In the middle of that decade the Palm Beach Club was built. Then, in the 1950s, the Las Gaviotas building was built. In the 1980s, the location where the Kon Tiki restaurant was located was reopened as the La Maquina del Sabor salsódromo.

On January 31, 1963, the Caplina, an oil tanker, got stuck 120 metres from the beach, where it could be easily seen.

In the early 1980s in Lima, the surf was affected by the construction of the road from La Herradura beach to La Chira beach. The construction of the work in 1983, carried out under the order of the then mayor Pablo Gutiérrez Weselby, without any technical study to support it, affected the cliff, the seabed, the width of the beach, the surf and the ecosystem of the area. The dynamite blasts carried out generated rocks that ended up on the seabed. Due to the above, on June 14, 1990, the Association for the Conservation of Beaches and Waves of Peru (ACOPLO) was formalized, bringing together a group of surfers and promoters of environmental conservation. ACOPLO became the second association in the world dedicated to the protection of wave breaks, after the Surfrider Foundation, created in 1984.

In 2004, a GREMCO project sought to build a marina on the beach. Based on the mobilizations of local surfers and the negotiations between the international organisation Save The Waves and the real estate company, the project was stopped.

In 2011, the Metropolitan Municipality of Lima during the administration of Mayor Susana Villarán invested more than S/.11 million with the objective of restoring and modernizing the beach boardwalk.

From 2010 to 2014, a dolphinarium located at the beach's surroundings housed two bottlenose dolphins that were transferred from a hotel in the city's financial district and whose captivity was a matter of local controversy.

== Protection status ==
On December 28, 2016, Directorial Resolution No. 1306-2016 MGP/DGCG was issued that protects the La Herradura surf based on a request established in a letter from the National Board Sports Federation (FENTA) in May 2016. The protection of the surf was the result of the 'Do it for your Wave' campaign organized by Carolina Butrich of the Peruvian Society of Environmental Law (SPDA), FENTA, companies such as Quiksilver and civil society made up of Peruvian neighbors and surfers, like Claudio Balducci and Diego Villarán.

== See also ==
- La Herradura Formation
- Costa Verde (Peru)
- Marine pollution
- Beach cleaning
