= Ramón Stagnaro =

Peruvian guitarist (1954–2022)

- Born: 10 May 1954; Lima, Perú
- Died: 16 February 2022 (aged 67) Los Angeles, California, U.S.
- Occupation: Guitarist
- Instruments: Guitars (electric, acoustic), charango, tres Cubano, tiple, bass guitar
- Spouse: Angelica G. Stagnaro 06/22/1993 - Present

Ramón Stagnaro (May 10, 1954 – February 16, 2022) was a Peruvian guitarist and producer who had a career of 40 years, and who had toured or recorded with many great artists such as Alex Acuña, Eva Ayllon, Diana Ross, Gino Vannelli, Celine Dion, Pedro Eustache, Jean Pierre Magnet, Alejandro Sanz, Enrique Iglesias, Dariush Eghbali, Raquel Bitton, Nelly Furtado, Ricky Martin, Andrea Bocelli, Roberto Carlos, Shahyar Ghanbari, Siavash Ghomayshi, Googoosh, Javad Tabani, Faramarz Aslani, Vangelis, Josh Groban, Jon Varto, Homayoun Shajarian and many many more. He appears on Yanni's live concert video, Tribute.

== Death ==
Stagnaro died on February 16, 2022, at the age of 67. A posthumous album, Por Nuestro Amor, was released on July 27, 2022 by the global music collective, Kolektivo containing 12 mostly unreleased songs all featuring Ramon's compositions and masterful guitar work in various Latin music styles.
