= Radio Doble Nueve =

Lima; Peru
- Frequency: 99.1 MHz

Ownership
- Owner: Frecuencia Modulada Radio Doble Nueve 99.1

History
- Founded: April 15, 1979

Links
- Webcast: Listen live
- Website: doblenuevelive.com

Radio Doble Nueve is a Peruvian radio station based in Lima, founded by Traffic Sound member Manuel Sanguineti on April 15, 1979. It broadcasts on 99.1 MHz. The station specializes in various styles of English-language rock, as well as other genres such as indie, alternative rock, pop, power pop, and reggae. According to Pedro Cornejo, it is the only radio station specialized in this genre in all of Peru.

== History, musical content, and programming guidelines ==
The station began broadcasting on April 15, 1979, initially with a repertoire focused on songs from the 1950s to the 1970s, covering genres such as rock and roll, rockabilly, surf rock, beat, and garage rock. In the early 1980s, it began incorporating productions from the new wave, post-punk, power pop, synth-pop, neo-psychedelia, gothic rock, and alternative movements. In 1984, weekly and annual airplay charts were implemented.

The station's music selection is primarily based on U.S. modern rock charts and, currently, also the international program Passport Approved. While prioritizing English-language content, the programming includes bands from various countries, such as the United States, England, and Canada. The schedule consists exclusively of songs in English, with periodic adjustments according to trends within the rock spectrum. On Sundays, the programs Nostalgia (1950s to 1970s), Resurrection Sunday (1980s and 1990s), and Radio Reggae were aired.

The station is recognized for pioneering the dissemination of international rock news in Peru, often ahead of other local radio stations. Examples include playing "Rock Lobster" (The B-52s) in 1979, while other stations only played it in 1983, and the early inclusion of songs such as "New Year's Day" (U2) and "Should I Stay or Should I Go" (The Clash). In the mid-1980s, it also introduced genres such as gothic rock and neo-psychedelia with bands like The Cure, Echo & The Bunnymen, The Sisters of Mercy, and The Mission. This practice of adapting to new trends continues to the present day.

== See also ==
- Radio Zeta Rock & Pop
