= T Tower =

Building in Lima, Peru

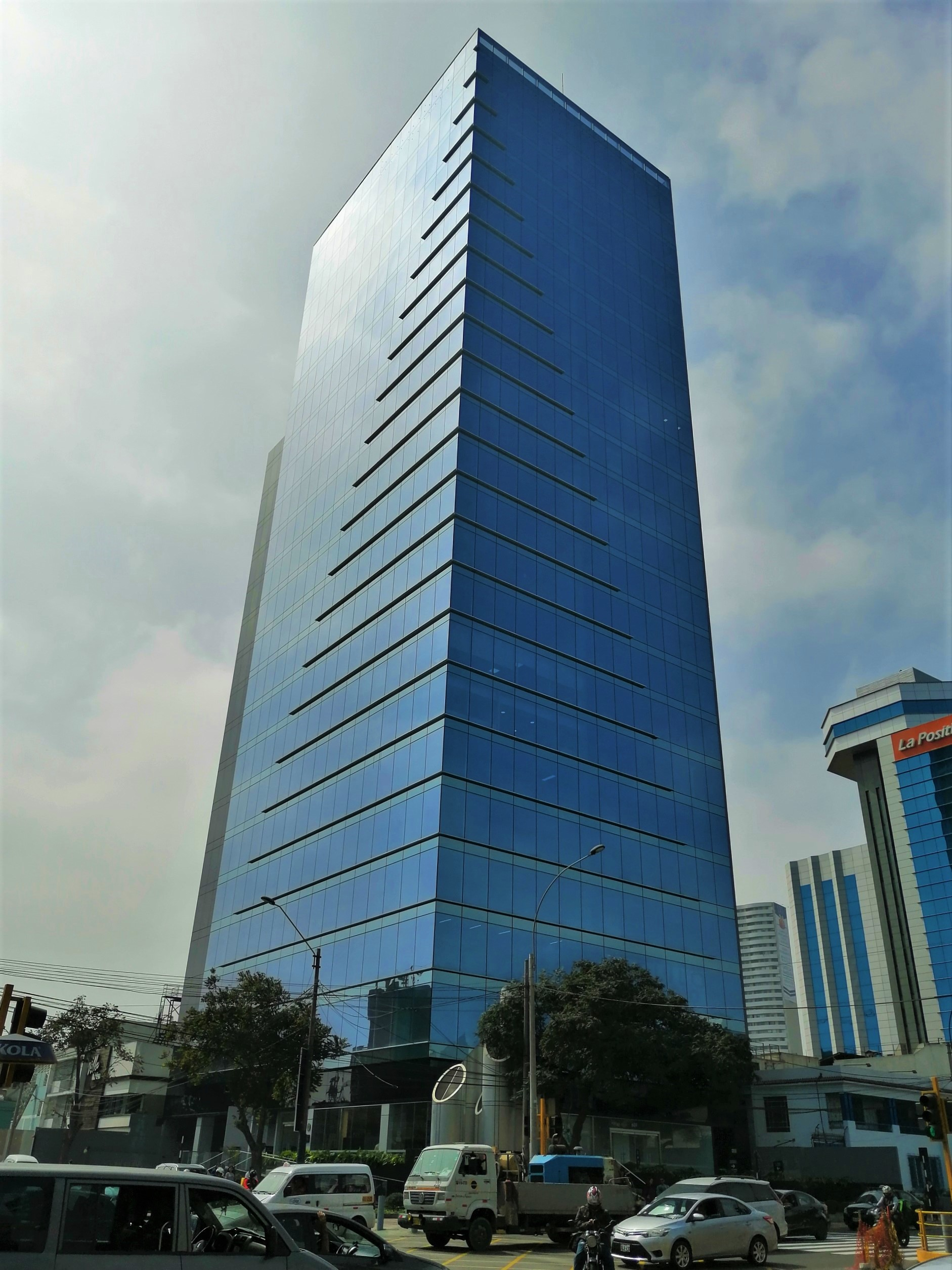
- Interactive map of the T Tower area

General information
- Location: San Isidro, Lima
- Coordinates: 12°05′28″S 77°01′35″W
- Construction started: 2015
- Construction stopped: 2018
- Cost: S/.115 million

T Tower is an office building located in San Isidro, Lima, Peru.

Construction began in 2015 at a cost of over S/.115 million and the building was inaugurated in 2018, has a height of 101 meters corresponding to the line of the façade and has 24 floors and a semi-covered rooftop. It is located in front of Javier Prado avenue in the corporate centre of San Isidro.

== See also ==
- List of tallest buildings in Peru
