= Dolphin Cove Jamaica =

- Interactive map of Dolphin Cove Jamaica
- Location: Ocho Rios, St. Ann; Montego Bay, St. James; and Lucea, Hanover
- Coordinates: 18.4171°N 77.1304°W
- Owner: Too Cool Ltd; Dolphin Cove Negril Ltd.
- Slogan: Experience of a lifetime
- Operating season: year round
- Website: dolphincoveja.com

Dolphin Cove Jamaica is a marine attraction in Jamaica at which guests can swim and interact with dolphins, sharks, and stingrays in their natural environment. Visitors may also interact with other species including iguanas, snakes and a variety of birds as well as other marine creatures in the Jungle Trail Walk. Dolphin Cove has been the recipient of many awards.

The company operates three facilities on the island: Ocho Rios, Montego Bay, and Lucea, which is claimed to be the largest natural dolphin lagoon in the world.

== History ==
When it opened in 2001, Dolphin Cove Ocho Rios was the first attraction of its kind in Jamaica. The second park opened in Montego Bay in 2005 at the Half Moon Resort and is reserved for guests of the resort. The third facility at Lucea opened during 2010.

In 2014, the company reportedly received two dolphins from a hotel in Peru, whose captivity had been the subject of controversy.

In 2015, Dolphin Discovery bought these locations, and now they are partners. On March 31, 2025, The Dolphin Company, owner of Dolphin Discovery and Dolphin Cove, filed for Chapter 11 bankruptcy protection to deal with its debt and financial challenges.
