= Inkaterra =

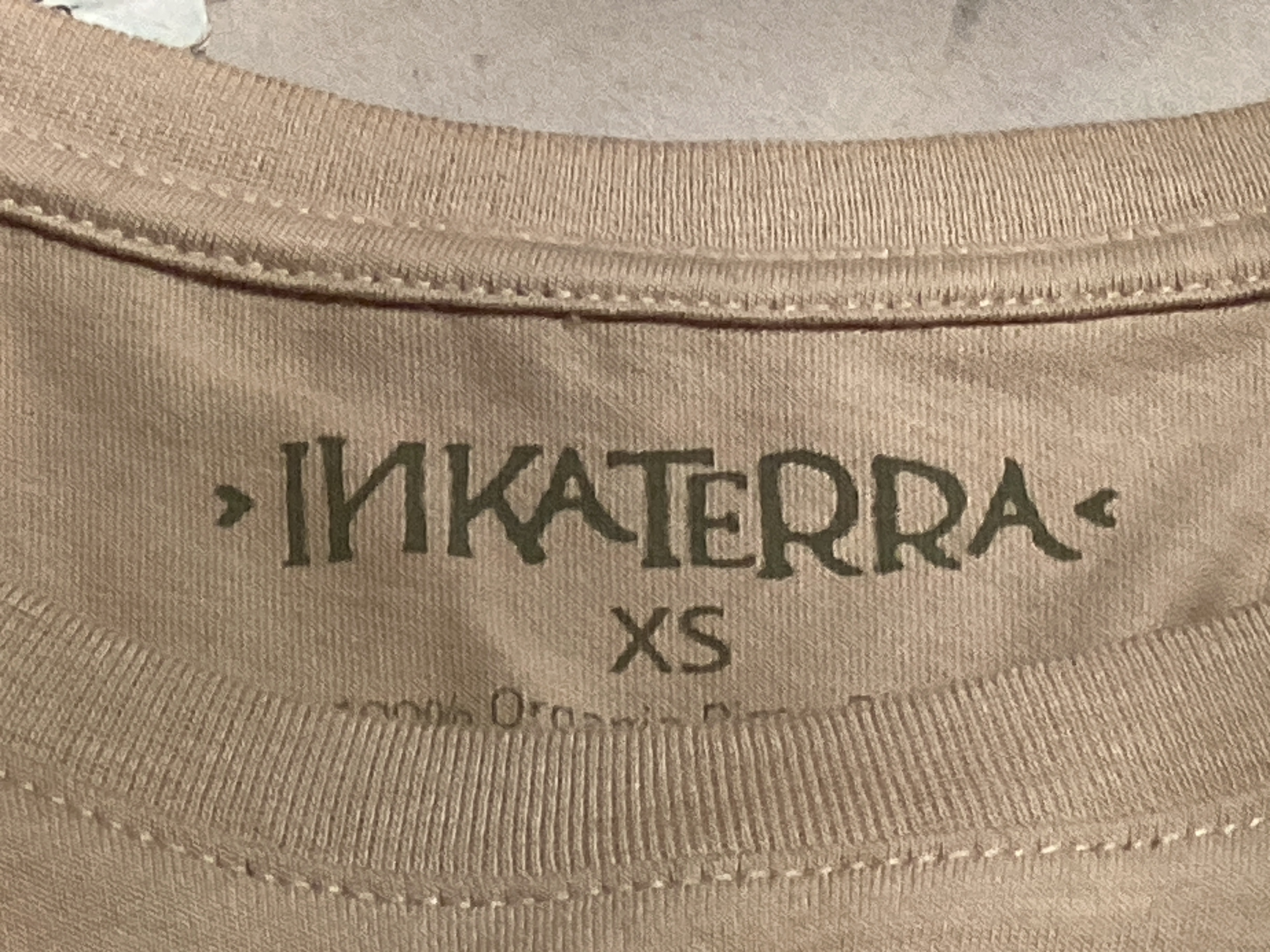
Logo of the brand

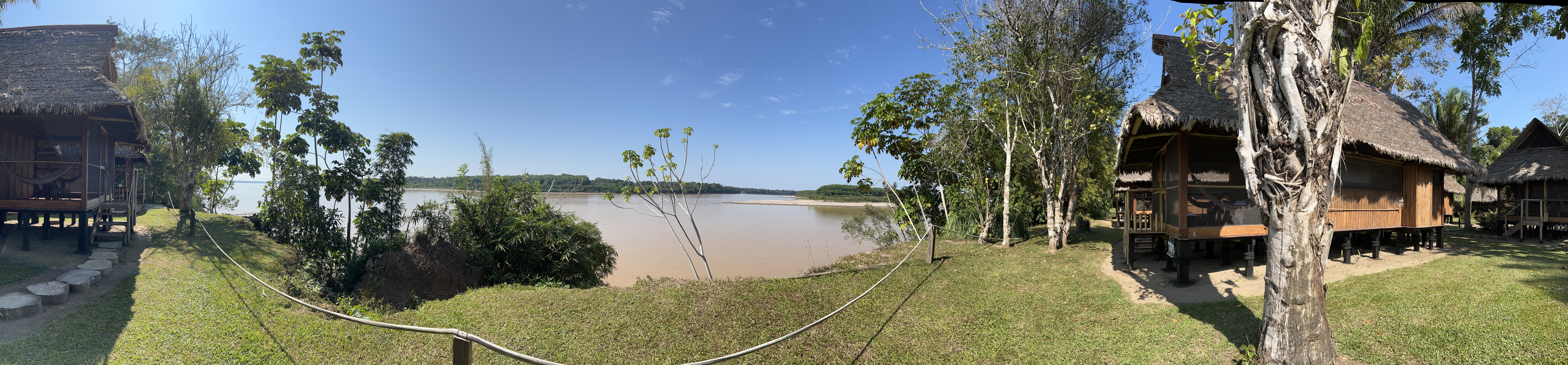
A view of its cabins

Inkaterra is a Peruvian eco-tourism company. Founded in 1975 by José Koechlin, the company owns and operates hotels at Machu Picchu Natural Reserve, the southeastern rain forest of the Amazon in Puerto Maldonado, Tambopata, the Sacred Valley, and a restored 16th century manor at Cusco.

== Gallery ==
Madre De Dios

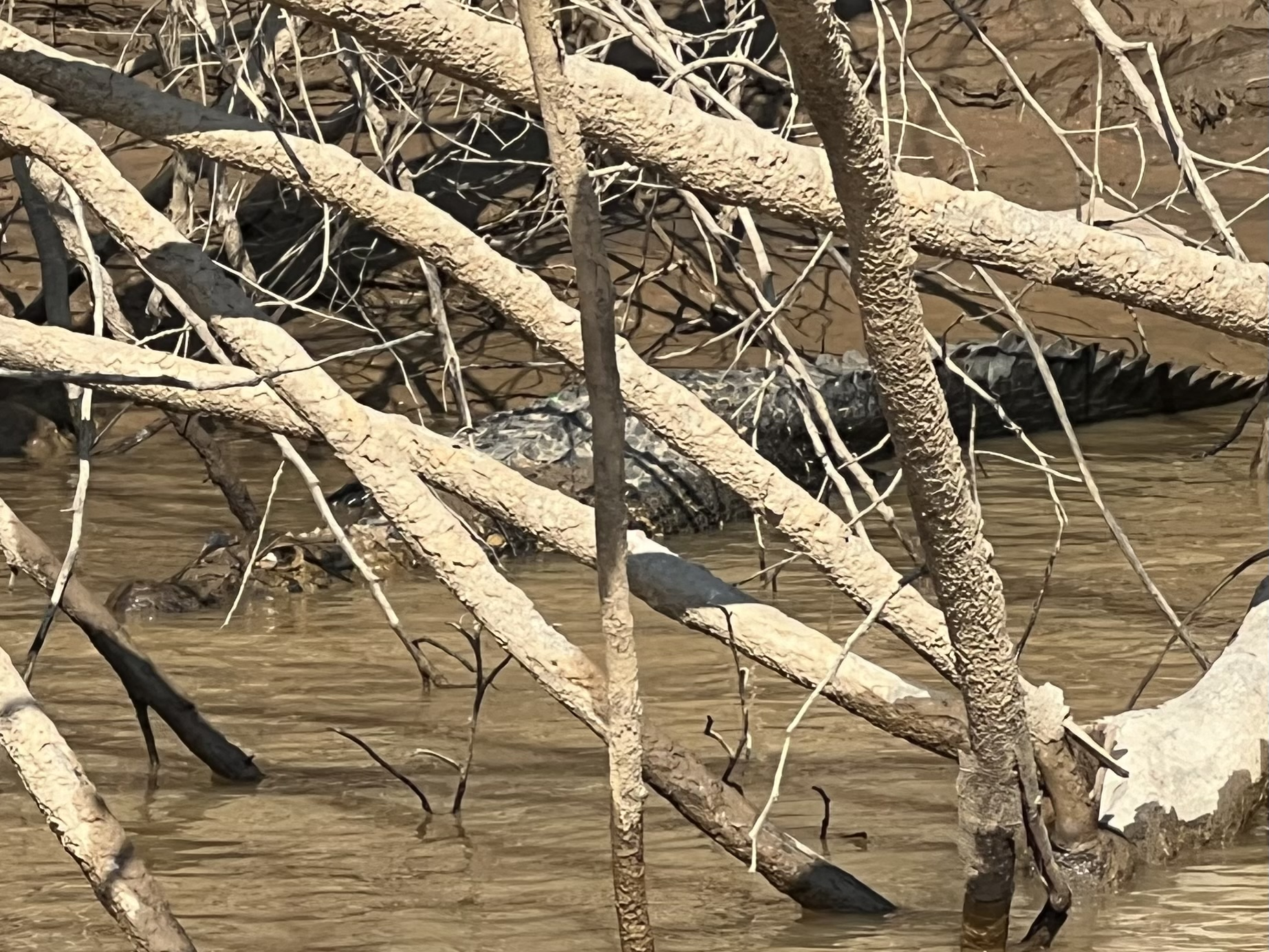
Black caiman found during one of its many tours

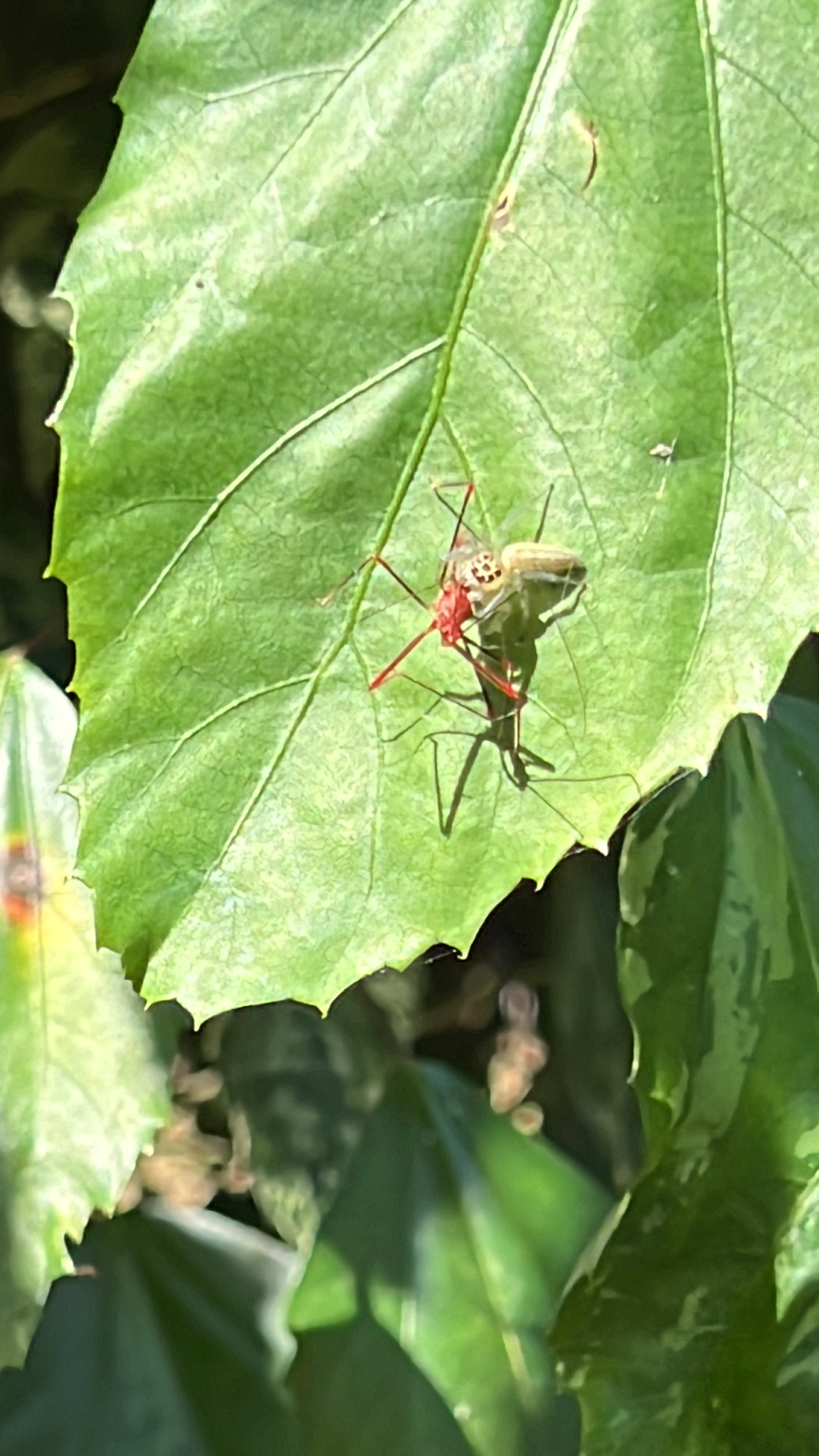
A jumping spider hunting an assassin bug at the front of one of the cabins

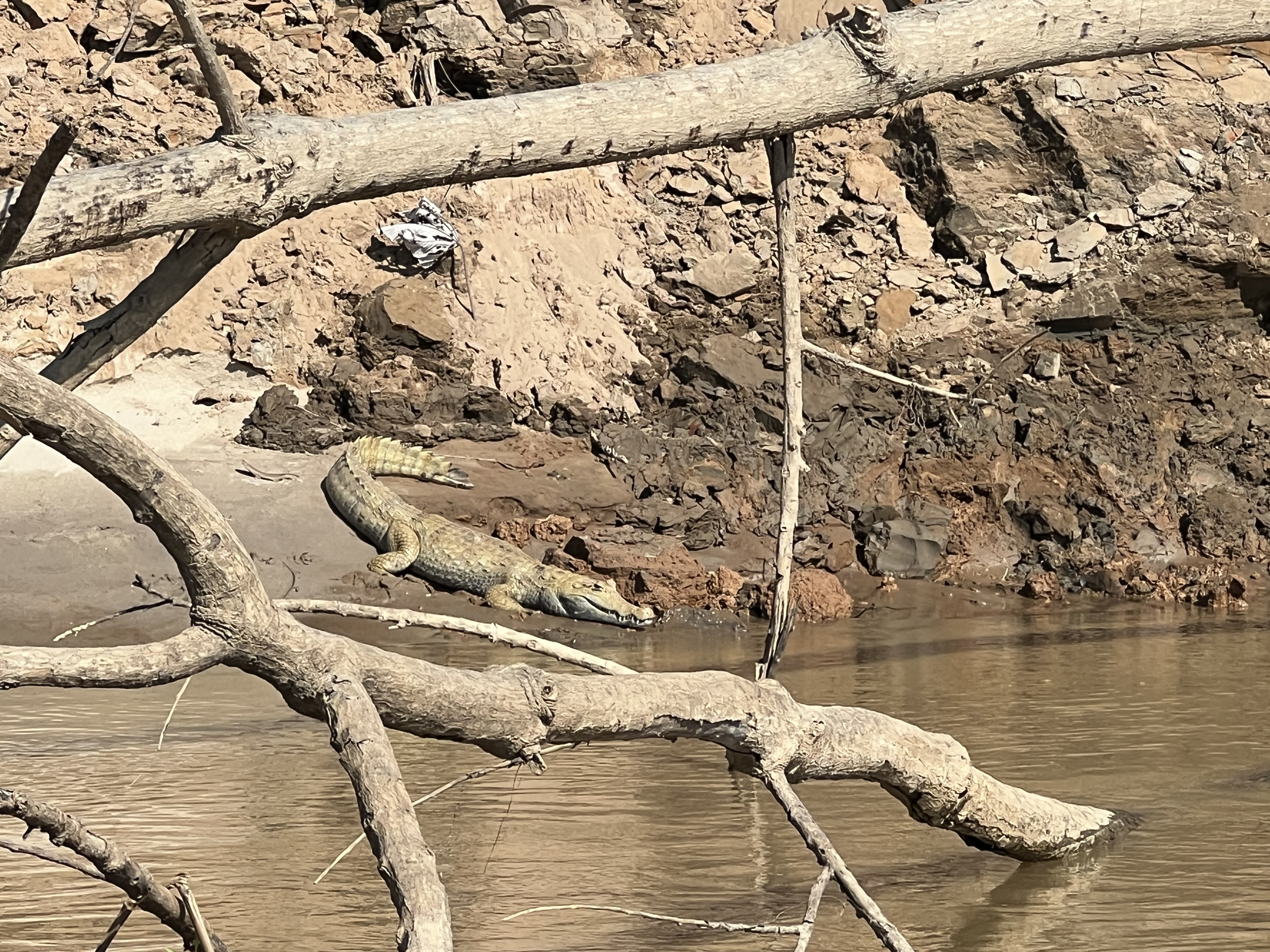
Spectacled caiman found from a boat ride to a destination, likely from of its many tourist attractions

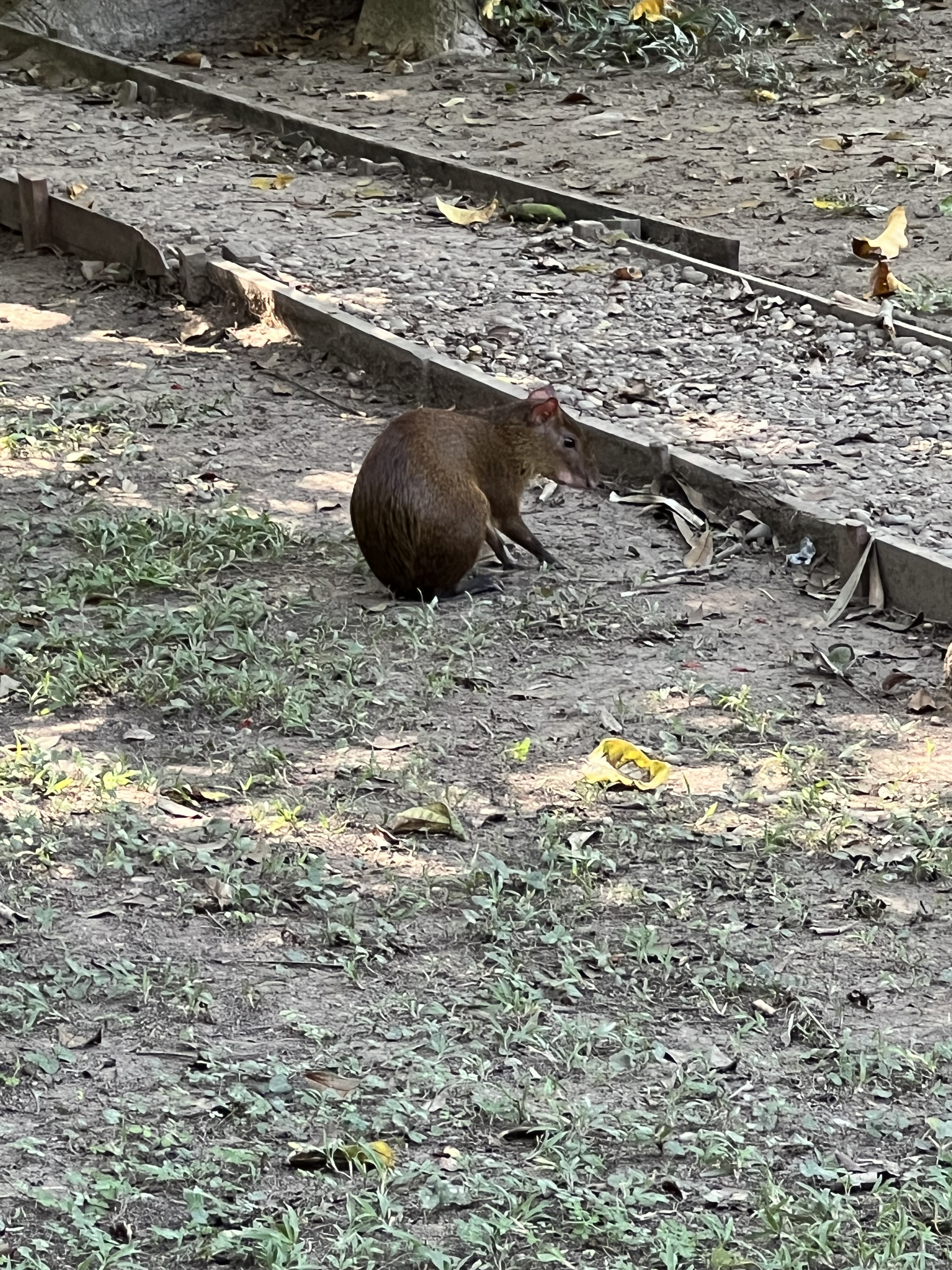
A Central American agouti feeding at the front of its many log cabins
