= The Westin Lima Hotel & Convention Center =

Building in Lima, Peru

Coordinates: 12.09159°S 77.02456°W

Hotel Westin Libertador
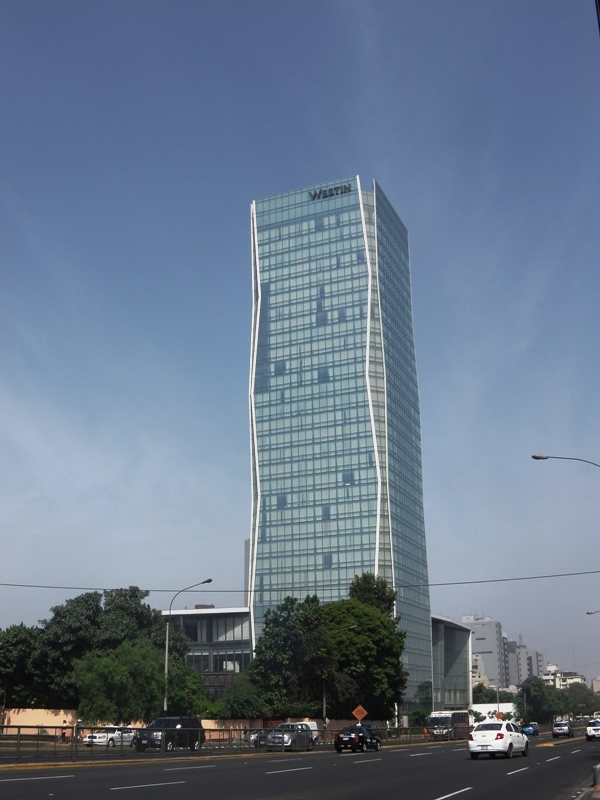
- Interactive map of the Hotel Westin Libertador area

General information
- Location: Las Begonias 450
- Inaugurated: 2012
- Cost: US$ 130 million

Height
- Height: 118,55 m

Technical details
- Floor count: 30
- Floor area: 72,000 m²

Design and construction
- Architect: Bernardo Fort-Brescia

Other information
- Number of rooms: 301

Website
- Official website

The Westin Lima Hotel & Convention Center, also known as the Hotel Westin Libertador, is a five-star hotel in San Isidro District, Lima. The hotel is owned by the Grupo Brescia and operated by Westin Hotels & Resorts.

== History ==
The building's construction started in 2008, lasting forty months and costing US$ 130 million in total. It was officially inaugurated by then president Alan García in 2011.

== Overview ==
The building has a height of 118,55 metres and occupies an area of 72,000 m^{2}. It has thirty floors and 301 rooms.

== See also ==
- Begonias Tower, located across the street
