= Jean Pierre Magnet =

- Born: Jean Pierre Magnet Vargas Prada; September 11, 1949 (age 77); Lima, Peru
- Genres: Rock, jazz, jazz fusion, Peruvian folk
- Occupations: Musician, record producer
- Instrument: Saxophone
- Formerly of: Traffic Sound, PeruJazz, Wayruro, Gran Banda, Serenata de los Andes
- Website: jeanpierremagnet.com

Jean Pierre Magnet Vargas Prada (born in Lima, Peru on September 11, 1949) is a saxophonist, composer, music producer, and director.

== Early life ==
Magnet is the oldest of three and the son of a French Basque father and Peruvian mother. He started his musical career at an early age while working with his father at Country Club Hotel in Lima, Peru. At 10 years old, he revealed his dream to become a saxophonist to his father who immediately gave him his first saxophone.

During his adolescence, Magnet joined Traffic Sound, a Peruvian rock band in the late 1960s. The band recorded covers of Jimi Hendrix, The Rascals, The Animals, and Iron Butterfly. Traffic Sound recorded four albums: A Bailar Go Go, Virgin, Traffic Sound and Lux, with "Meshkalina" their greatest hit between the 1970s and 1980s.

== Education ==
In 1972, Traffic Sound disbanded. At age 20, Magnet began his studies of music theory and flute at the National Conservatory of Buenos Aires in Argentina, followed by jazz at the University of Southern Mississippi. Afterwards, he moved to San Francisco where he undertook his first gigs as a street musician, striving to accomplish his greatest dream, which was to study at Berklee School of Music of Boston.

== Fusing jazz with Peruvian rhythms ==
In Peru, Magnet organized five jazz festivals, featuring Arturo Sandoval, Ray Barreto, Irakere, Paquito D'Rivera, and Alex Acuña for the first time in Lima, Peru. Magnet was invited to Satchmo's, a jazz club in Peru. He formed Wayruro, a band that played Andean music with other styles.

In 1984 he established the PeruJazz quartet with Manongo Mujica, Enrique Luna, and Julio "Chocolate" Algendones. PeruJazz was the first band to combine African-Peruvian and Andean rhythms with jazz. The band performed at Umbria Festival of Italy in 1987, playing after Sting. PeruJazz performed for two consecutive years at the Montreal Jazz Festival in Canada (1989 and 1990). In 1990, PeruJazz played at the New Music America Festival (Miami) and the Cervantino Festival in Mexico, besides London, Buenos Aires, Santiago, and Hamburg.

In 1997 Magnet founded Gran Banda (Great Band), performing a 1940s big band style which he directed, built on mambo and swing music. In addition to their repertoire of Glenn Miller and Damaso Perez Prado, the band added classic themes and contemporary jazz. Gran Banda provided Magnet with the opportunity to undertake an African-Peruvian and Criollo fusion project featuring Armando Manzanero, the Peruvian rock band Fragil, and Eva Ayllon.

== Serenata de los Andes ==
In 2006, Magnet recorded Serenata Inkaterra in co-production with Inkaterra Hotels. This record was released two years later with 25 musicians, featuring Alex Acuña and Ramón Stagnaro. Serenata de los Andes has united musical styles from Peruvian Andes, recreating a sort of Andean symphony with 6 violins, 7 saxophones, 5 panflutes, 1 harp, 1 guitar, and percussion. The band toured in 2011 at Teatro de Bellas Artes de Bogota, Colombia and Rose Hall, Home of Jazz at Lincoln Center, New York.

== Discography ==
=== Traffic Sound ===
- A Bailar Go-Go (Mag, 1968)
- Virgin (Mag, 1969)
- Traffic Sound (Mag, 1979)
- Lux (Sono Radio, 1971)

=== Wayruro ===
- Wayruro (1996)

=== PeruJazz ===
- PeruJazz en Vivo (Cernicalo Producciones, 2001)
- Mundo Nuevo (Cernicalo Producciones, 2007)

=== La Gran Banda ===
- Jean Pierre Magnet y La Gran Banda en Vivo (2007)
- Eva Ayllon, Jean Pierre Magnet y La Gran Banda – Le Cantan al Peru en Vivo (2007)
- Eva Ayllon, Jean Pierre Magnet y La Gran Banda – Del Peru para el Mundo (2007)

=== Serenata de los Andes ===
- Serenata Inkaterra (2006)
- Serenata de los Andes en Vivo (2009)

=== Jean Pierre Magnet ===
- Arroz con Mango (2007)
- Criollo (2003)
- Mi Peru
