= San Isidro District, Lima =

District of Lima, Peru

San Isidro
- District
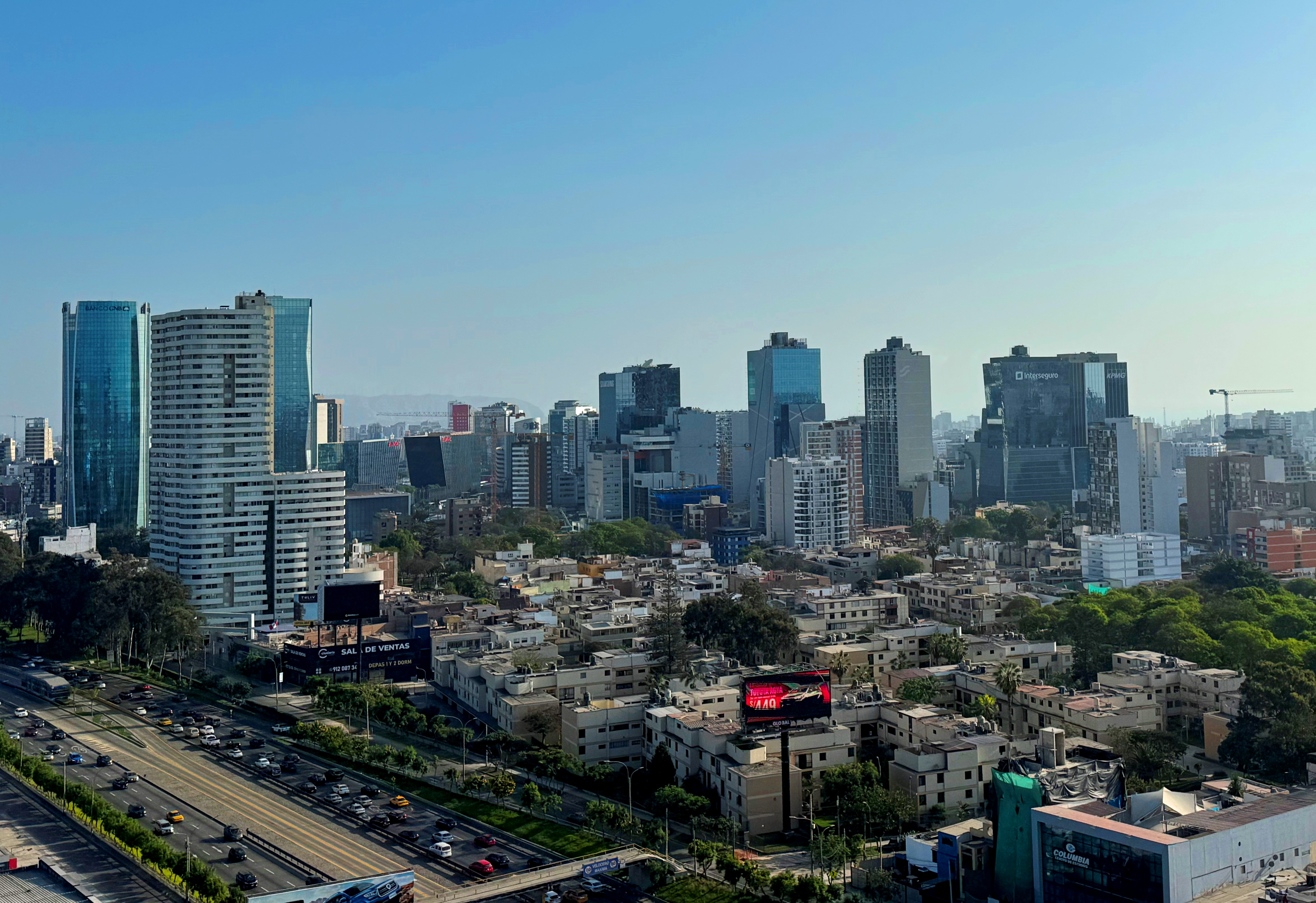
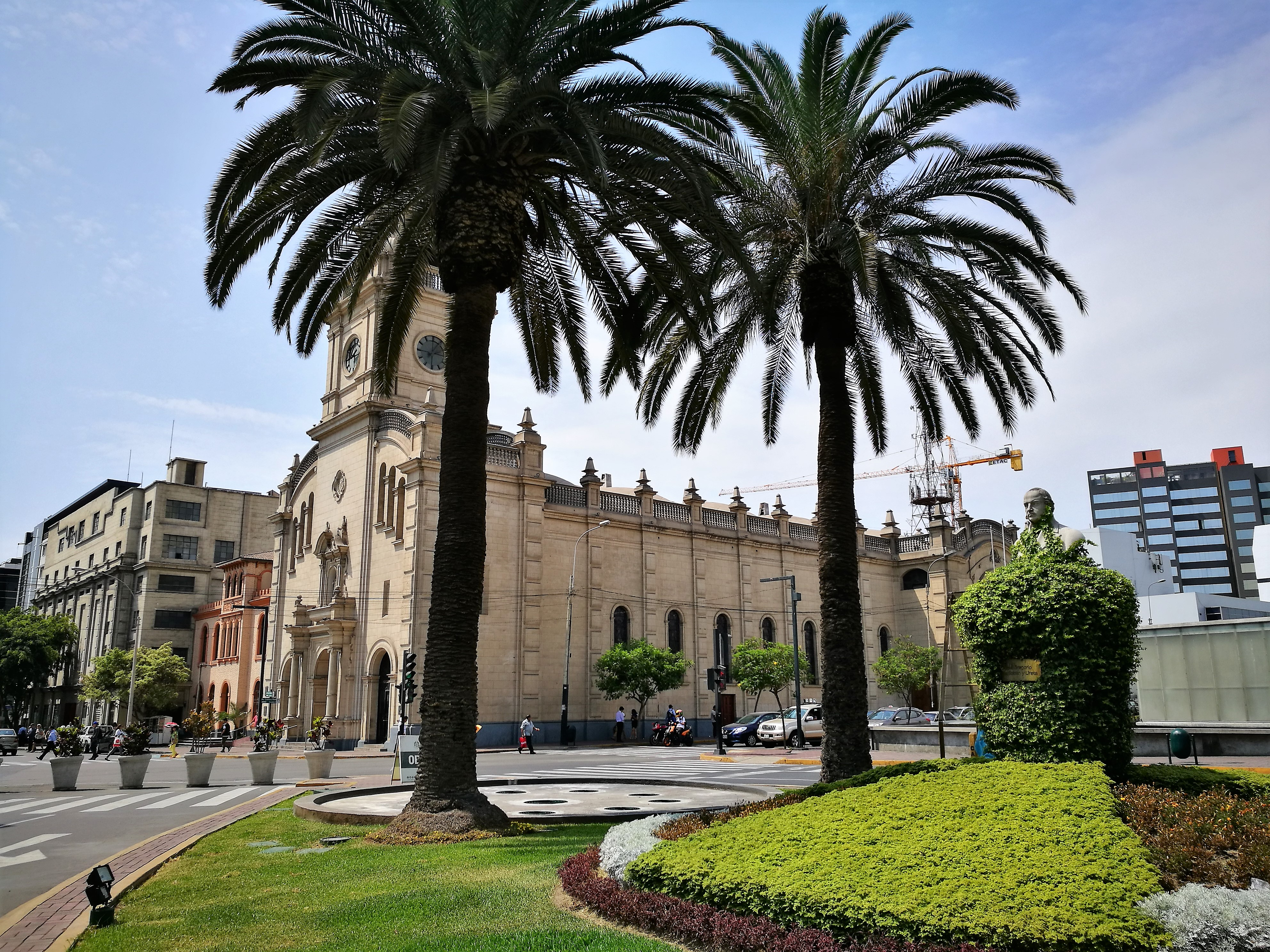
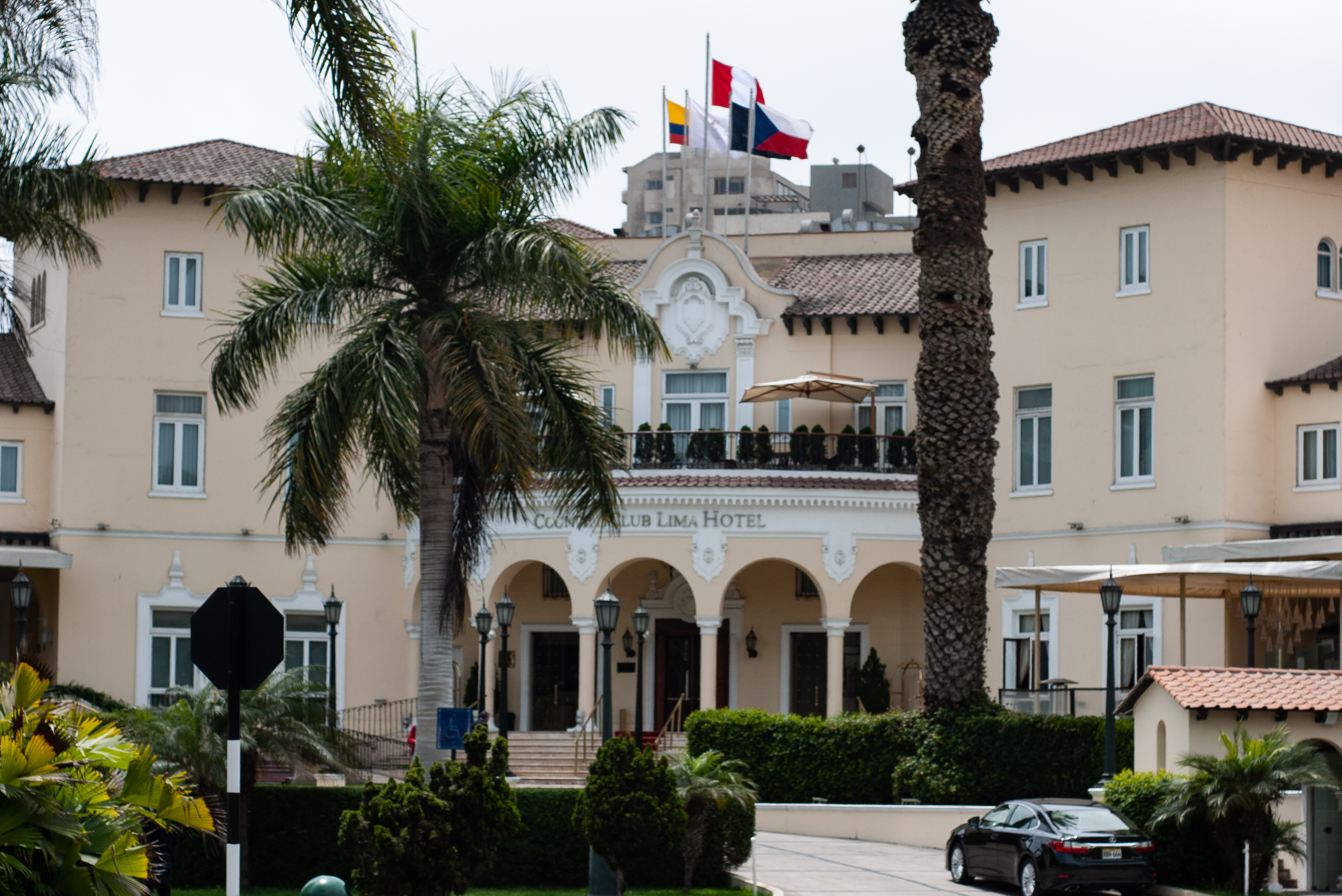
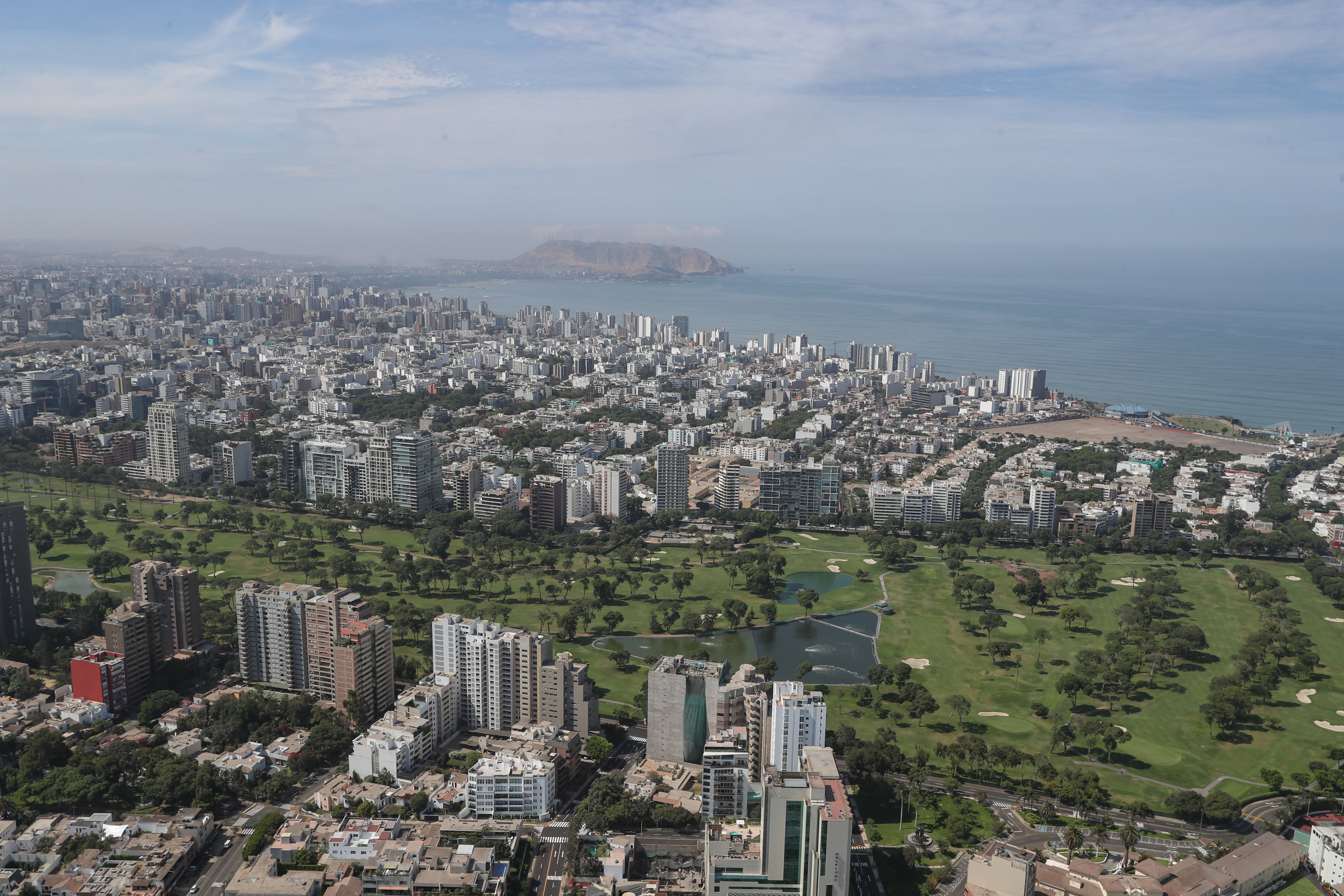
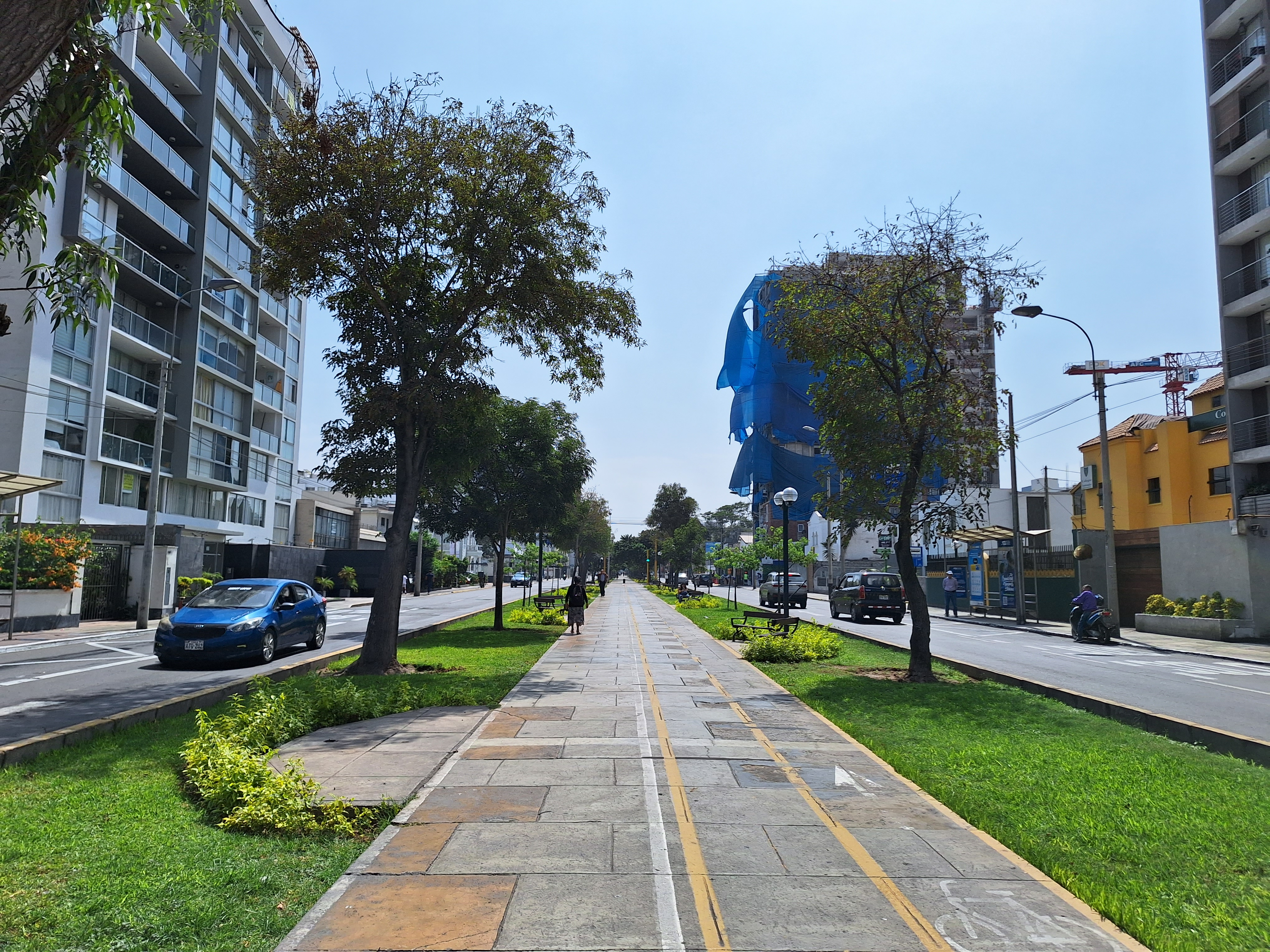

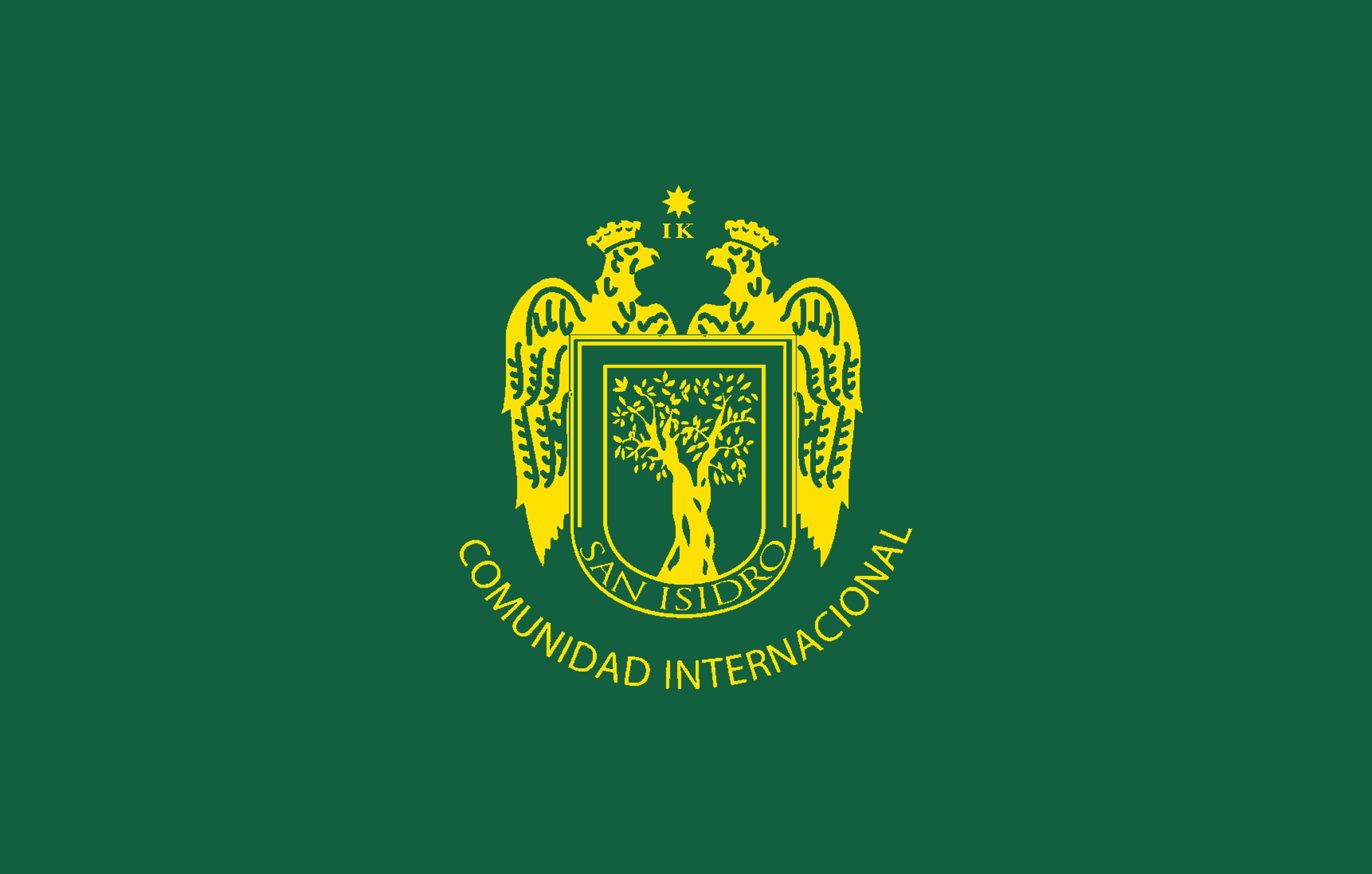
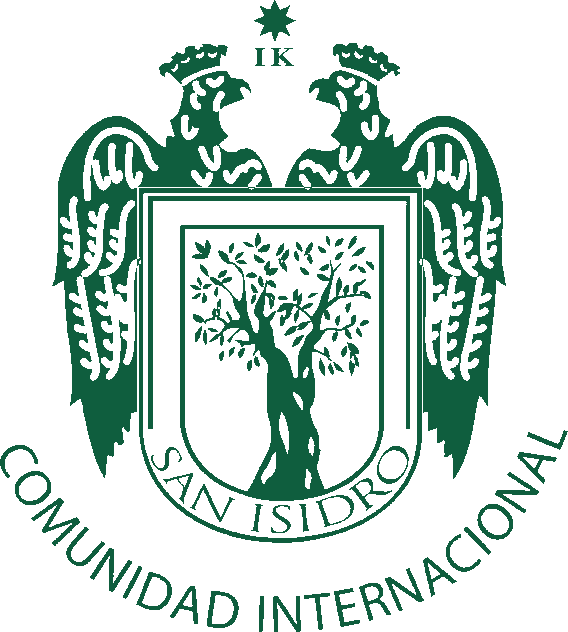
- Flag Coat of arms

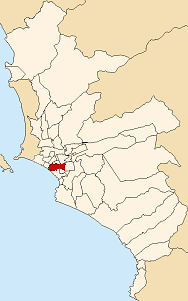
- Location of San Isidro in Peru
- Coordinates: 12°05′57″S 77°02′05″W
- Country: Peru
- Department: Lima
- Province: Lima
- Created: April 24, 1931

Government
  - Mayor: Nancy Vizurraga

Area
  - Total: 9.36 km^{2} (3.61 sq mi)
- Elevation: 109 m (358 ft)

Population (2024)
  - Total: 70,000
  - Density: 7,500/km^{2} (19,000/sq mi)
- Time zone: UTC-5 (PET)
- UBIGEO: 140124
- Website: www.munisanisidro.gob.pe

San Isidro (Spanish: [ˌsan iˈsidɾo]; lit. 'Saint Isidore') is a district of Lima, Peru. Created in 1931, it is an upscale part of the city's west central area, with about 600 meters of coastline. In recent years, it has become a major financial quarter, as many banks and businesses left downtown Lima to set up their headquarters in modern office blocks. It is inhabited by mostly upper middle and upper-class families.

== Etymology ==
The district takes its name from Isidro de Cortázar y Abarca, 5th Count of San Isidro, who acquired the Limatambo hacienda. After this purchase, it became known as Los condes de San Isidro.

== History ==
During the Viceroyalty of Peru, when the first land distribution was made, the Huallas region was awarded to Nicolás de Ribera y Laredo, founder of the City of Kings (Lima) and the Lima City Council.

In 1560, Antonio de Ribera, attorney general, mayor, and field marshal to Gonzalo Pizarro, brought the first olive trees that gave rise to the El Olivar Grove. This estate, before taking the name of its owner, the Count of San Isidro, who acquired it in 1777, bore the names of its previous owners, including Martín Morón, Pedro de Olavarrieta, Tomás de Zumarán, and Antonio del Villar. Its last colonial owner was Isidro de Cortázar y Abarca, Count of San Isidro and the first ordinary mayor of Lima.

In 1853, it passed into the hands of José Gregorio Paz Soldán, and finally, into the hands of the Moreyra and Paz Soldán family.

=== 20th century ===
In 1920, the San Isidro Limited Urban Development Company was formed, entrusting the urbanization project to the sculptor and urban planner, Manuel Piqueras Cotolí, who conceived a varied and irregular plan with the aim of creating a picturesque neighborhood. He also hoped it would present an architectural appearance of some unity and character.

The district was officially created on April 24, 1931, San Isidro, along with Orrantia and Country Club neighborhoods, was separated from Miraflores.

Following a process of urban development during the 1980s and 1990s, the district became the financial center of the city of Lima, and one of its most dynamic districts.

In 1996, Arcos Dorados SA registered in the country, inaugurating its first McDonald's restaurant in the district on October 18 of the same year. Operating through Unimak, a company headed by businessman Roberto Lukac, it soon began opening more restaurants, with its second location opening soon after at Chacarilla del Estanque.

Following a raid in the Japanese ambassador's residence in the district by 14 members of the Túpac Amaru Revolutionary Movement in December 1996, the district was sent into the international spotlight due to what became known as the Japanese embassy hostage crisis. The 126-day siege concluded on April 22, 1997, through Operation Chavín de Huántar, a military action undertaken by the military unit of the same name.

=== 21st century ===
In March 2004, the 'Promenade of Nations'—a promenade lined with national flags—was inaugurated at Pershing Avenue.

== Geography ==
The district has a total land area of 9.36 km^{2}. Its administrative centre is located at 109 meters above sea level. It is part of Lima's Cono Centro, an unofficial subregion of the city.

=== Boundaries ===
- North: Jesús María, Lince and La Victoria
- East: San Borja
- South: Surquillo and Miraflores
- West: the Pacific Ocean and Magdalena del Mar.

For more than fifty years, its western border has been disputed with neighboring Magdalena del Mar. A judge ordered the councils of both districts to deposit the money of the affected areas' taxpayers in the National Bank of Peru until this long-standing conflict is resolved.

The district has about 600 meters of coastline along the Pacific Ocean.

=== Climate ===
Climate data for Lima
Month	Jan	Feb	Mar	Apr	May	Jun	Jul	Aug	Sep	Oct	Nov	Dec	Year
Record high °F	79	79	79	75	72	68	66	64	66	68	72	75	72
Record high °C	26	26	26	24	22	20	19	18	19	20	22	24	22
Average precipitation days	1	1	0	0	1	2	3	3	3	2	2	0	16
Average rainy days	4	2	3	2	5	11	12	15	13	7	5	3	82
Average relative humidity (%)	85	80	80	85	85	85	85	85	85	85	85	85	84.2
Mean monthly sunshine hours	179.1	169	139.2	184	116.4	50.6	28.6	32.3	37.3	65.3	89	139.2	1,284
Source: Weatherbase (Temperature, precipitation and humidity). and Universidad Complutense de Madrid (Sunlight)

== Demographics ==
According to a 2002 estimate by the INEI, the district has 68,438 inhabitants and a population density of 6,165.6 persons/km^{2}. In 1999, there were 20,598 households in the district.

== Culture ==
San Isidro prides itself on being home to many Peruvian artists. A few museums, as well as the Wak'a Wallamarka, a pre-Inca burying temple which dates back to the 4th century where concerts and exhibitions are held occasionally, showing the cultural heritage of the district.

Notable residents of San Isidro have include painter Fernando de Szyszlo, former presidents Pedro Pablo Kuczynski and Martín Vizcarra, and other politicians such as Javier Pérez de Cuéllar, José Antonio García Belaúnde, and Francisco Tudela, among others.

=== Landmarks ===
- The second and third largest buildings in the country, the Hotel Westin Libertador and Begonias Tower respectively, are located next to each other, the latter belonging to the Grupo Brescia conglomerate. Other tall buildings, such as the T Tower, are also present in the district.
- There are 15 Catholic Churches, synagogues and temples of other religions.
- Lima's most important avenues (Javier Prado and Paseo de la República), intersect in the district.
- The district serves as the financial centre of the country with a total of 21 bank headquarters and 50 agencies.
- Monuments to Peruvian heroes and other world personalities (Gandhi, John Paul II, etc.)
- 58 embassies and consulates are located in the district, including those of Algeria, Australia, Austria, Bolivia, Chile, China, Colombia, Costa Rica, Cuba, Czech Republic, Dominican Republic, Ecuador, Egypt, El Salvador, Finland, France, Greece, Honduras, Hungary, India, Indonesia, Israel, Jamaica (honorary), Malaysia, Mexico, Morocco, Nicaragua, North Korea, Panama, Portugal, Romania, Russia, Saudi Arabia, Serbia, Slovenia (honorary), Spain, Switzerland, Thailand, Turkey, Ukraine and Uruguay.

== Transport ==
The district is serviced by the Corredor Rojo, a bus system that operates at Avenida Javier Prado.

Residents of the city in the district also have access to the Expreso San Isidro, an electric bus service operated by the municipal government since 2026.

== Organizations ==
The International Civil Aviation Organization (ICAO) has its South American Regional Office in San Isidro District.

== Gallery ==
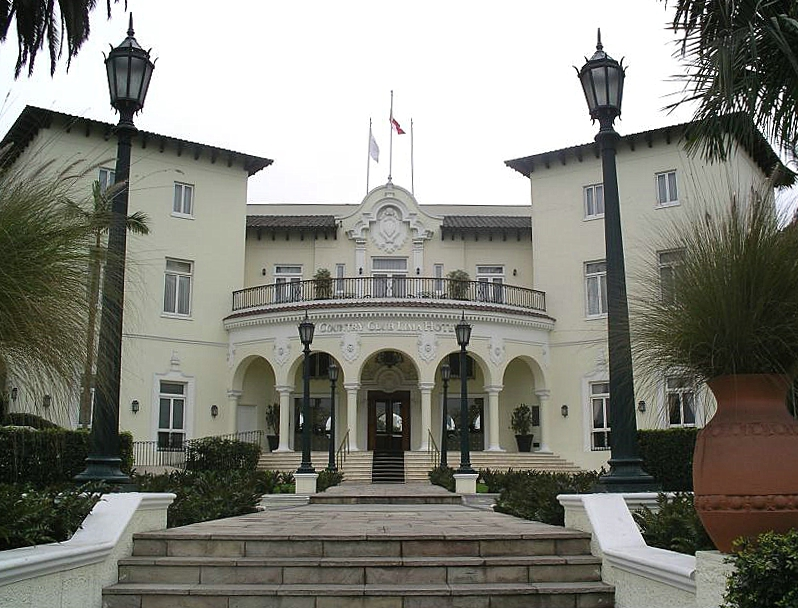
The Country Club, a 5 star hotel

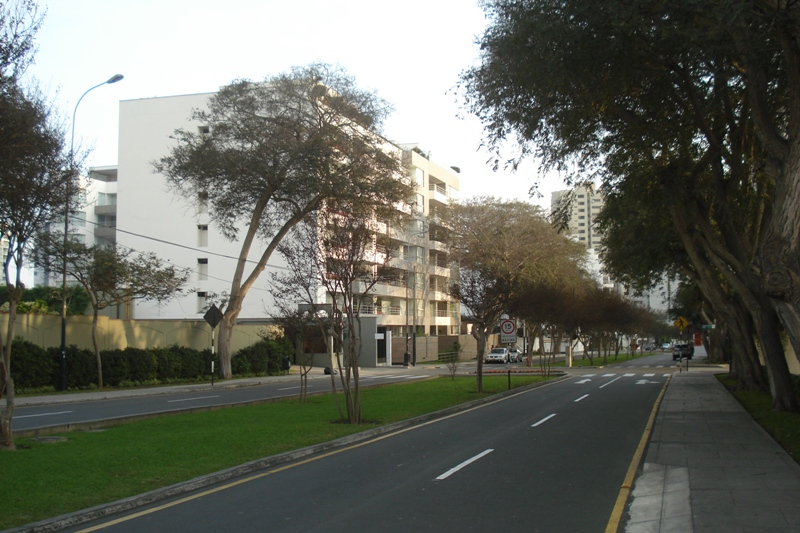
Santo Toribio Avenue

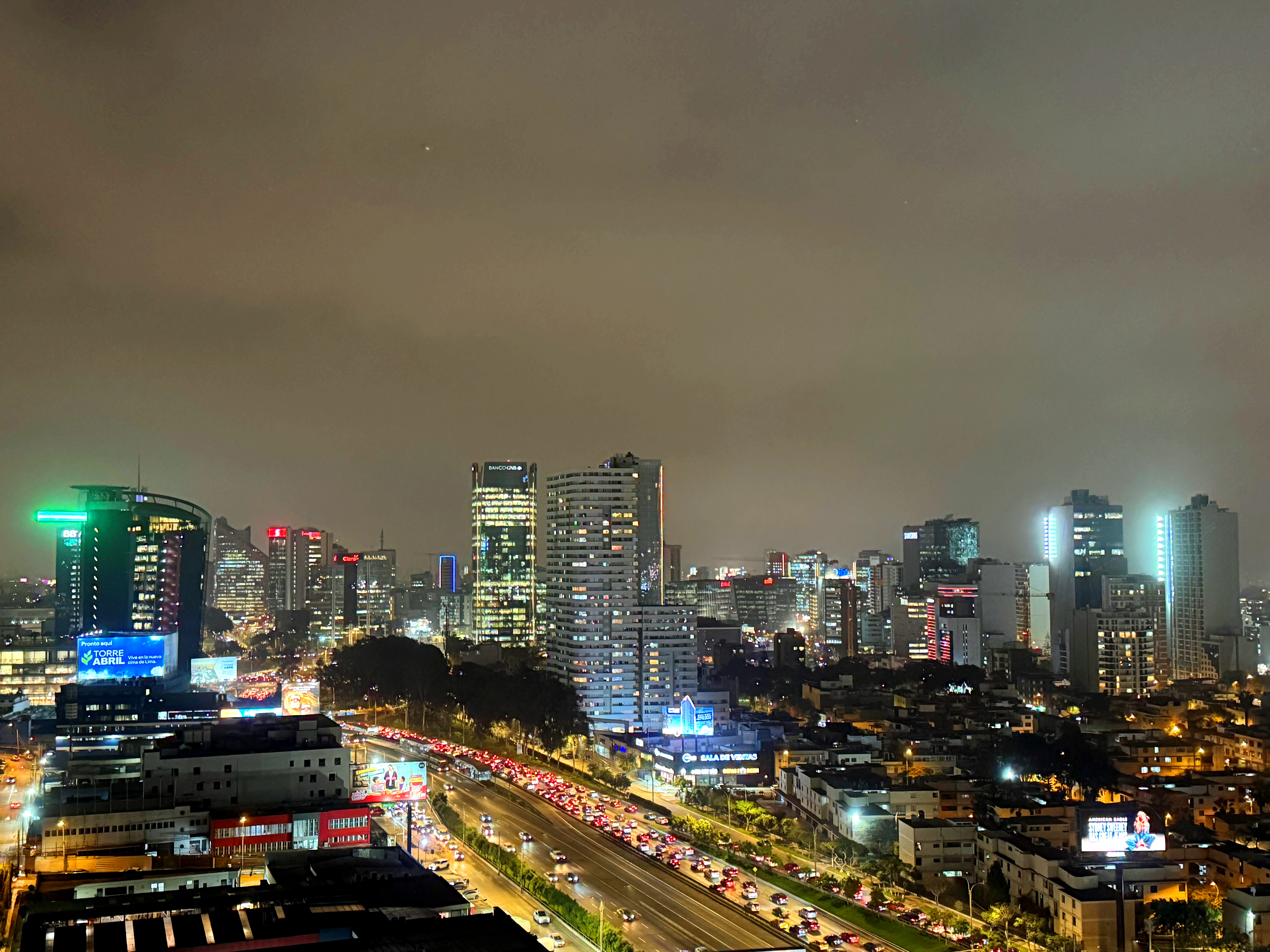
San Isidro District, Lima
