= 1909 Peruvian coup attempt =

1909 coup d'état attempt in Peru

1909 Peruvian coup d'état attempt
- Part of the Aristocratic Republic
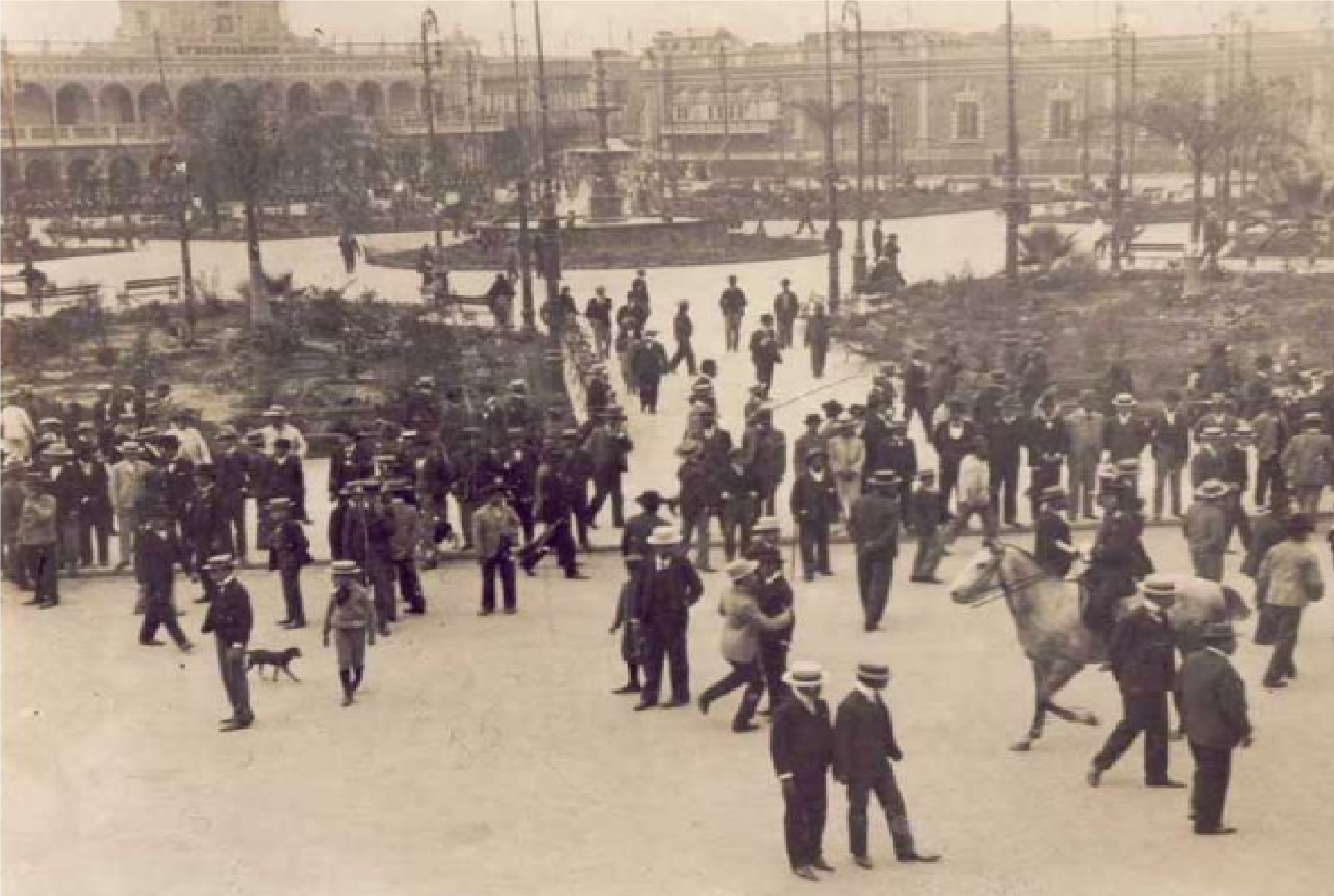
- The Plaza Mayor during the events
Date	May 29, 1909
Location	Central Lima
Result	Government victory: Leguía refuses to resign; Revolution suppressed by the Army

Belligerents
Government of Peru	Rebel Pierolistas

Commanders and leaders
Augusto B. Leguía; Enrique V. Gómez	Carlos de Piérola (WIA); Amadeo de Piérola; Isaías de Piérola

Casualties and losses
- Over 100 people dead in total, including civilians

The 1909 Peruvian coup d'état attempt was an attempted coup d'état carried out on May 29, 1909 by relatives of former president Nicolás de Piérola and supporters of the Democratic Party, known as "Pierolistas" for their support of the former president. The brief episode was motivated by political tensions between the party and Congress and dissatisfaction with the unemployment caused by the Panic of 1907.

== Coup ==
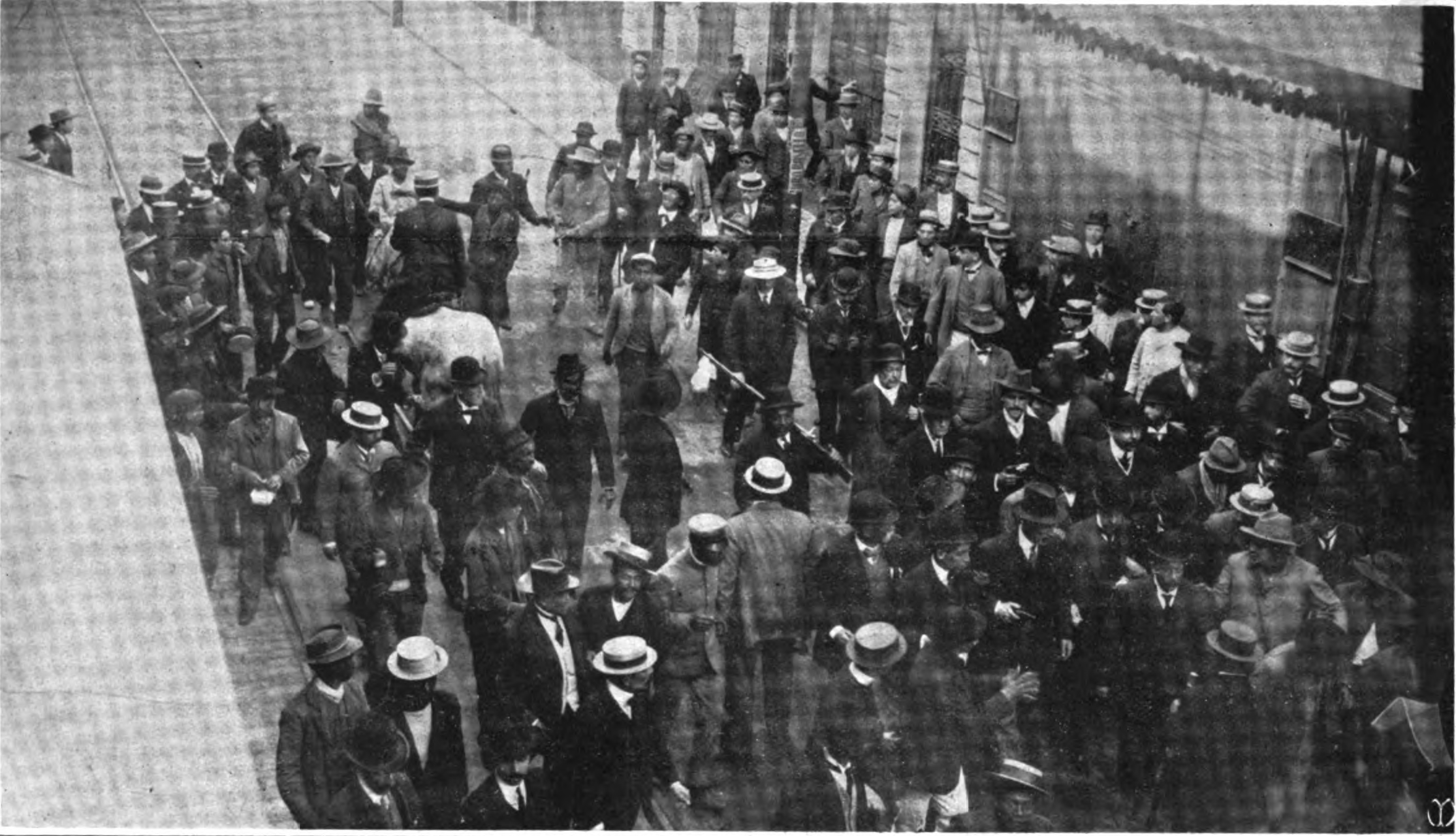
Leguía paraded by the rebels walking through Jr. Unión.

On May 29, 1909, a group of reportedly 36 people (out of 200 conspirators) affiliated with the Democratic Party met at the La Colmena Building in the Plazoleta de la Merced. Of these, 25 people, headed by Carlos, Amadeo and Isaías de Piérola—the brother and two sons of Nicolás de Piérola, former president of Peru—left towards the Calle Palacio soon after 2 p.m., guided by the clock of the Cathedral, arriving at a door of Government Palace.

The sentinel at the gate, Alejandro Champa y Quispe, was fatally shot, while another guard, Pedro Potenciano Choquehuanca, was wounded by four gunshots at the corridor that led to a waiting room. Once the group reached the presidential area, aide-de-camp Eulogio Eléspurucan attempted to stop them but was instead fatally shot, with the group reaching the room where President Augusto B. Leguía was located. Once Leguía was cornered, he was ordered to sign his resignation, but he immediately refused.

While the Palace was being breached, a second—and much smaller—group headed by Orestes Ferro left for the Calle Pescadería, ambushing the guard of the Police Intendancy and disarming the soldiers there, talking over the Prefecture and the Ministry of Government. A third group of a little over 10 men unsuccessfully attempted to move through the Plaza Mayor, being stopped by the guards there.

With Leguía refusing to resign, he was taken with the group out of the building while being shot at from troops in its rooftop led by Major Augusto Paz. Miguel Abraham Rojas, who had accompanied Leguía up to that point, separated from the group, while Manuel Vicente Villarán joined them shortly before leaving the Palace. The small group paraded Leguía along the Jirón de la Unión until they reached Pando street, where the residences of Leguía and Augusto Durand Maldonado were located, and then changed course towards Inquisition Square, with an hour passing by until police intervened.

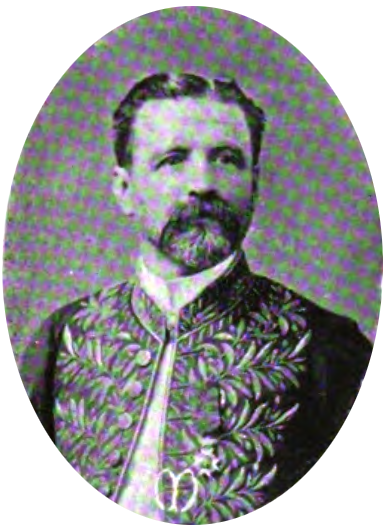
Consul-General Luis Lembcke.

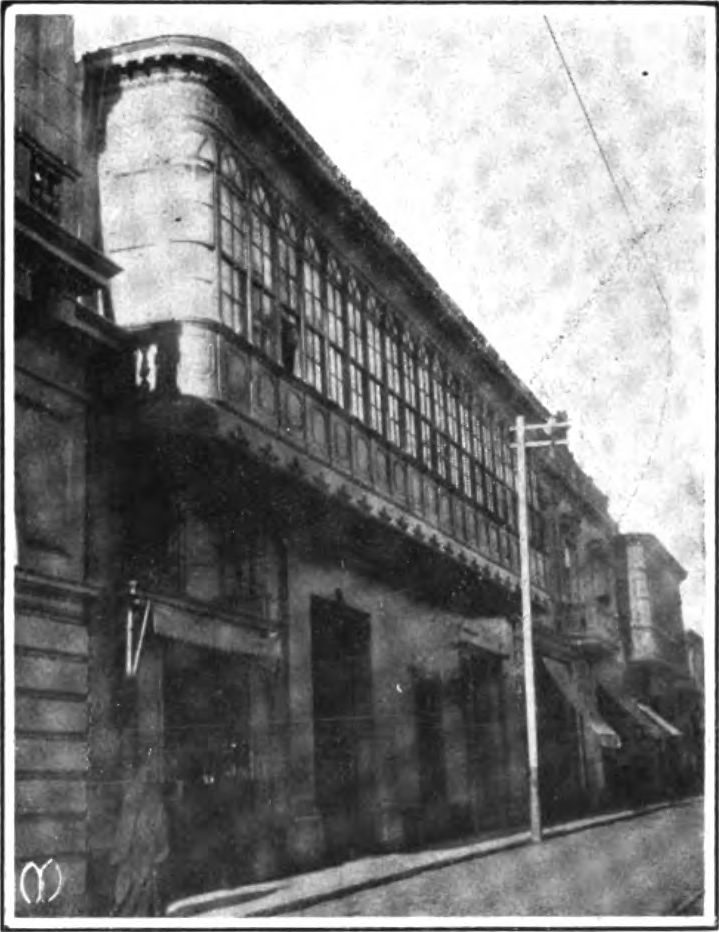
The consulate of Sweden.

Once at the square, the group positioned themselves between the base of the equestrian statue of Simón Bolívar and the main door of the building that then housed the Senate. Again ordered to quit, Leguía calmly refused again. His response (Spanish: No firmo.) became famous after the event. Jorge Corbacho, a witness at the scene, denounced the events to the Army's general staff and demanded their action, which was initially ignored until a cavalry unit under the command of Alférez Enrique V. Gómez finally left towards the square.

Gómez initially returned without having taken action, but later returned and the group fired at the crowd, leaving several dead and wounded. Leguía and Villarán lay on the floor (the former pushed by civilian Roberto Lama, which was later credited with saving his life) while the conspirators escaped to nearby locations, including the Senate. Soon after, Gómez—armed with a revolver—and his men approached the two men. Leguía lay without his hat, his hair uncombed and covered with blood.

Carlos de Piérola was injured by the gunfire, initially staying at the Senate building until 6 p.m. and then being taken to the nearby Swedish Consulate, then serviced by Consul-General Luis Lembcke, to be treated for his injuries. He had been injured three times, and his injuries included a gunshot in the hand.

== Aftermath ==
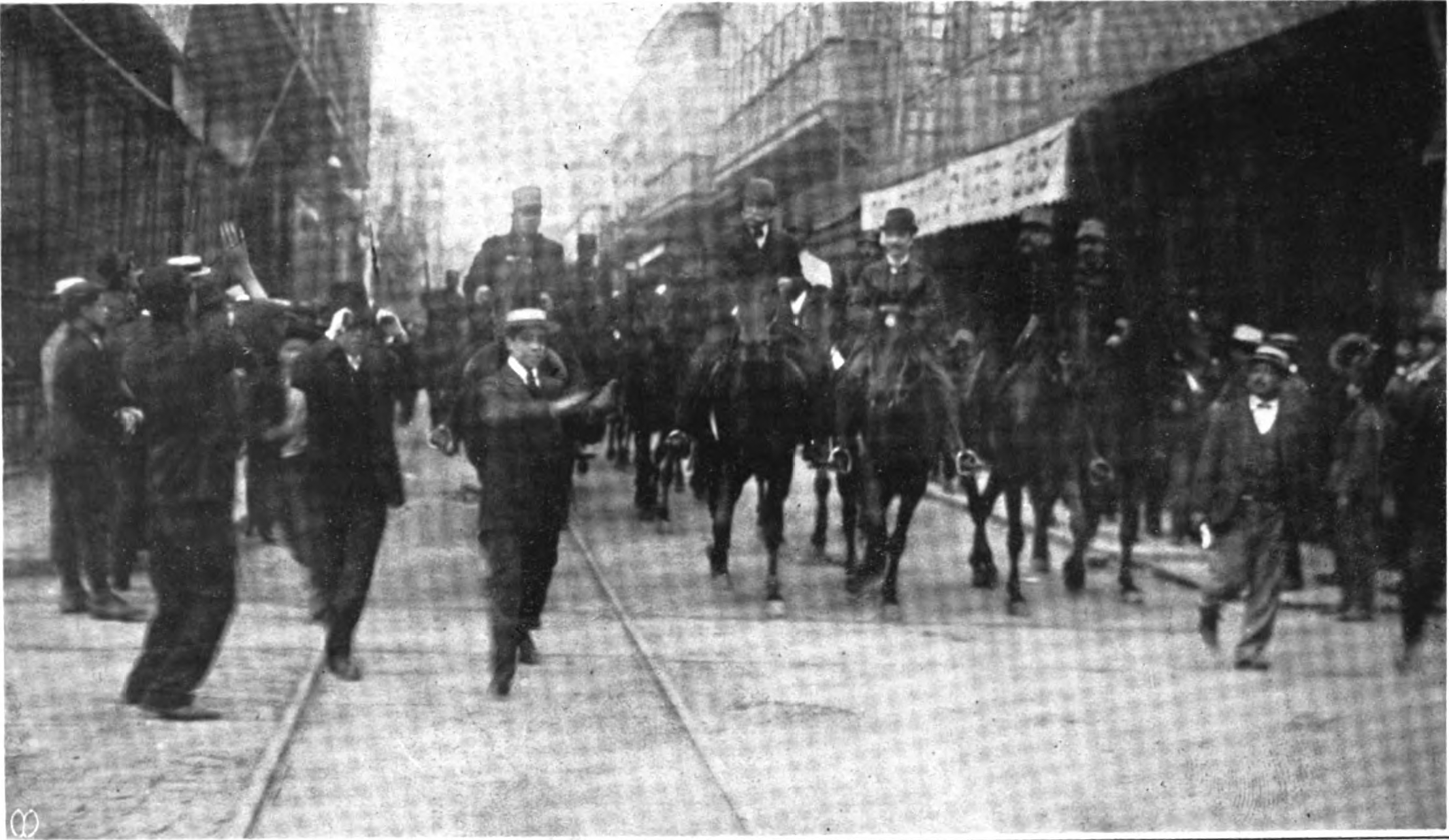
Leguía with his troops after the events at Inquisition Square.

Having triumphed, Leguía, now on a horse and accompanied by high-ranking members of government and the Army, paraded through the city at around 6 p.m., with crowds cheering for him despite having previously shown indifference. Leguía recalled that, among the crowd, was one young man who had been very vocal in his protests against him hours before. Gómez was immediately promoted to lieutenant and soon after to captain by Congress.

A group of curious onlookers, to which some of the fugitives had joined, was executed at random on the same afternoon by the Army in premises of the Senate. Meanwhile, some rebels at the Palace were instead spared by loyalist troops. Writers for the pro-Democrat newspaper La Prensa, as well as its director, Alberto Ulloa Cisneros, were taken to the Intendancy. On that same night, the newspaper's premises were attacked and looted by troops, who destroyed its machinery. Other enemies of the regime, such as Durand, were also persecuted and subjected to trial under the new premiership of Rafael Villanueva Cortez.

Nicolás de Piérola, who was having lunch at the residence of acquaintance Aurelio Sousa Matute Filipinas street (today the 5th block of Jr. Carabaya) during the events, denied having advanced knowledge of the events.

Amadeo and Carlos de Piérola were both jailed at the Lima Penitentiary, while Isaías left for Bolivia. In February of the following year, Amadeo—accompanied by Orestes Ferro and Enrique Llosa—escaped from captivity. Pedro Portillo, then director of the penitentiary, was dismissed from his position.

Eléspuru and Choquehuanca, the guards killed when Government Palace was breached, where honoured with effigies inside the building. Avelino Céspedes, who was wounded during the events and died two days later, was also honoured, with his widow and children financially rewarded.

== See also ==
- 1872 Peruvian coup d'état, also short-lived
