= Lamp of the Three Graces =

Landmark in Lima, Peru

Coordinates: 12°03′05″S 77°02′06″W

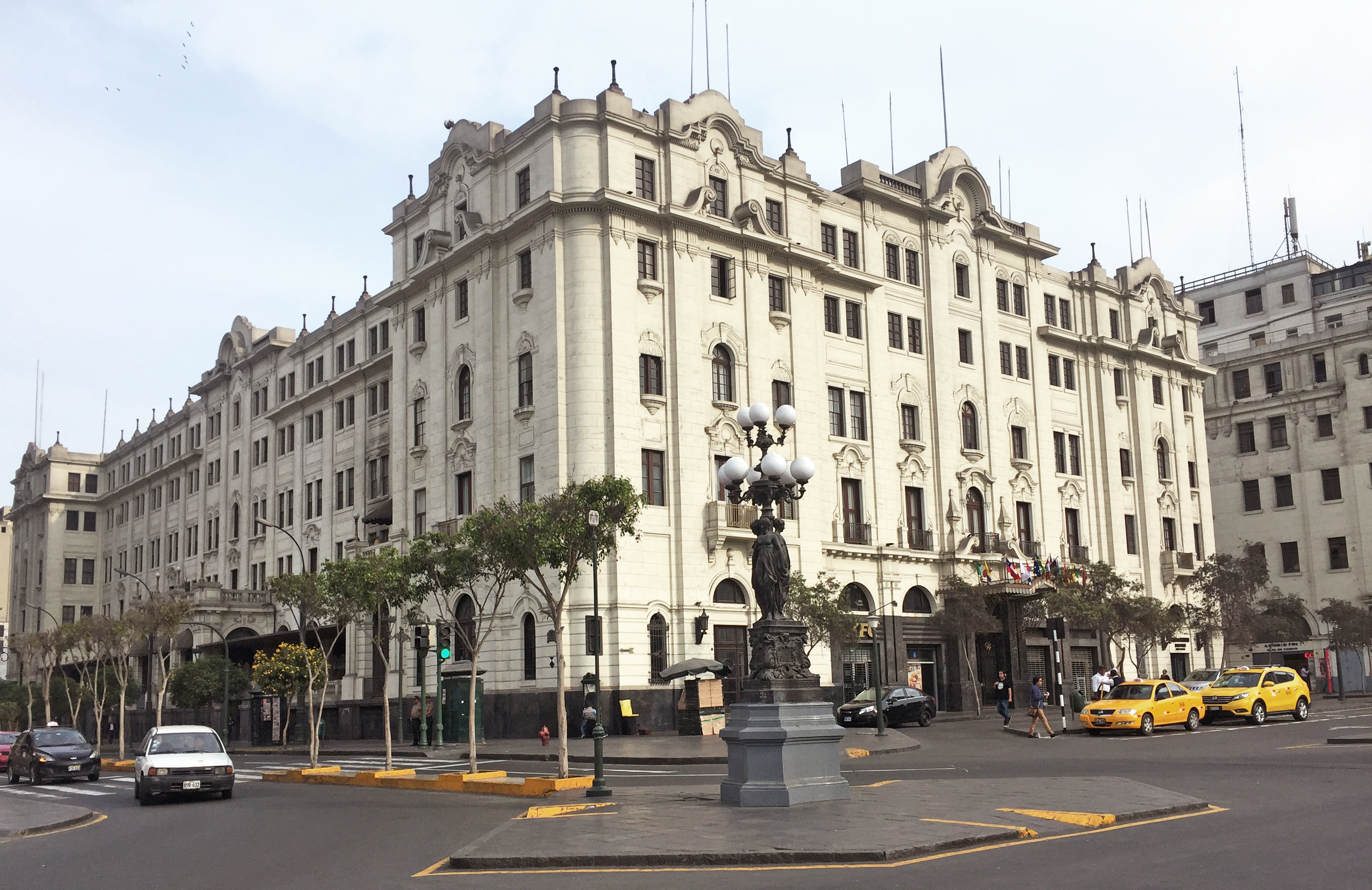
- The lamp (foreground) with the Hotel Bolívar in the background
- Year: 19th century
- Designation: Cultural heritage of Peru
- Location: Lima

The Lamp of the Three Graces (Spanish: Farola de Las Tres Gracias) is a sculpted lamppost next to San Martín Square, in the historic centre of Lima, Peru. It is based on a marble work of Germain Pilon, a French Renaissance sculptor, where the Three Graces are holding the heart of Henry II of France. The sculpture, which has a total height of 4.75 metres (15.6 ft), was declared part of the Cultural Heritage of the Nation in 2018.

== History ==
The sculpture has undergone several moves throughout its history, from its initial location in the courtyard of the old Teatro Principal, where it was possibly installed around 1874, to Union Square, then Merced Square and ultimately its final location in front of San Martín Square in 1915. While the Theatre is considered to be its initial location, an 1872 photograph by Eugenio Courret of the exhibition at the Parque de la Exposición shows an identical statue next to a restaurant built for the event.

The sculpture was restored by the Municipality of Lima in a four-month period in late 2019, under the Mayoralty of Jorge Muñoz Wells.

== See also ==
- The Three Graces (Whitney)
