= Basilica and Convent of Nuestra Señora de la Merced =

Coordinates: 12.0483°S 77.0327°W

Basilica y Convento de Nuestra Señora de la Merced
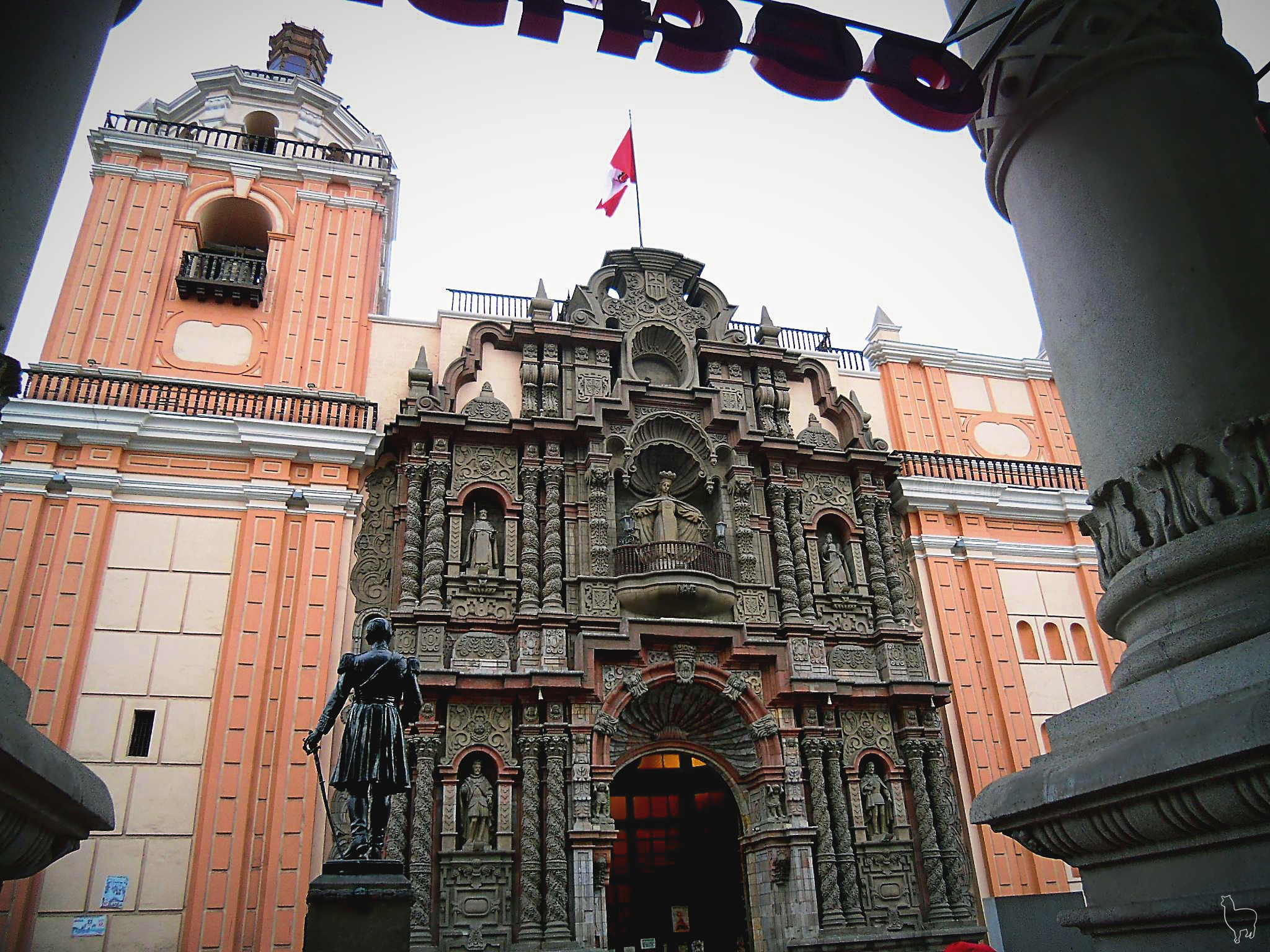
- Façade
- Basilica y Convento de Nuestra Señora de la Merced
- Location: Lima
- Country: Peru
- Denomination: Roman Catholic

History
- Founded: 1535
- Dedication: Virgin of Mercy

Architecture
- Style: Churrigueresque
- Completed: 1765

The Basilica and Priory of Nuestra Señora de la Merced is a Roman Catholic church located in Lima, Peru. It was designed in the Baroque style known as Churrigueresque. The church was built under the supervision of Friar Miguel de Orenes in 1535. The Blessed Virgin Mary of Mercy, the patroness of the Peruvian Armed Forces, is venerated in the Basilica. The Mercedarians, who evangelized the region, helped to develop Lima by building many of the churches preserved today.

== Location ==
The Basilica and convent are located at Jirón de la Unión 621, (formerly called Calle de la Merced), at the intersection of block 6 with the first block of the Jirón Antonio Miró Quesada (Calle Jesús Nazareno), in the historic center of Lima.

== History ==
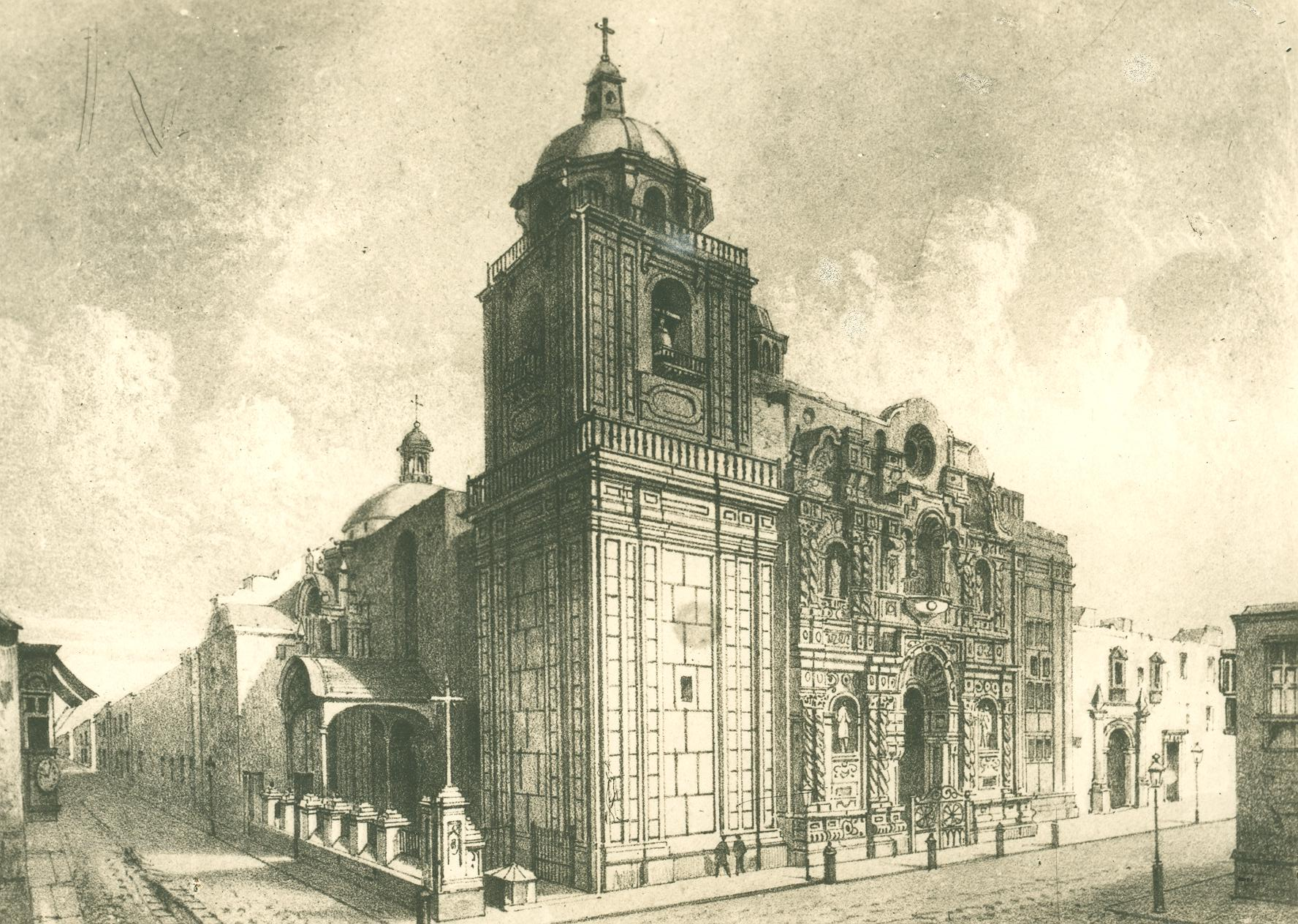
Basílica and convent of Nuestra Señora de la Merced in the 19th century

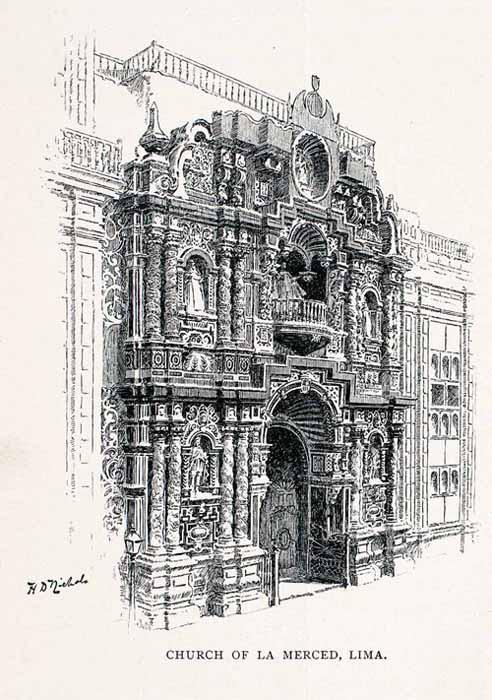
Drawing of the entrance, circa 1891.

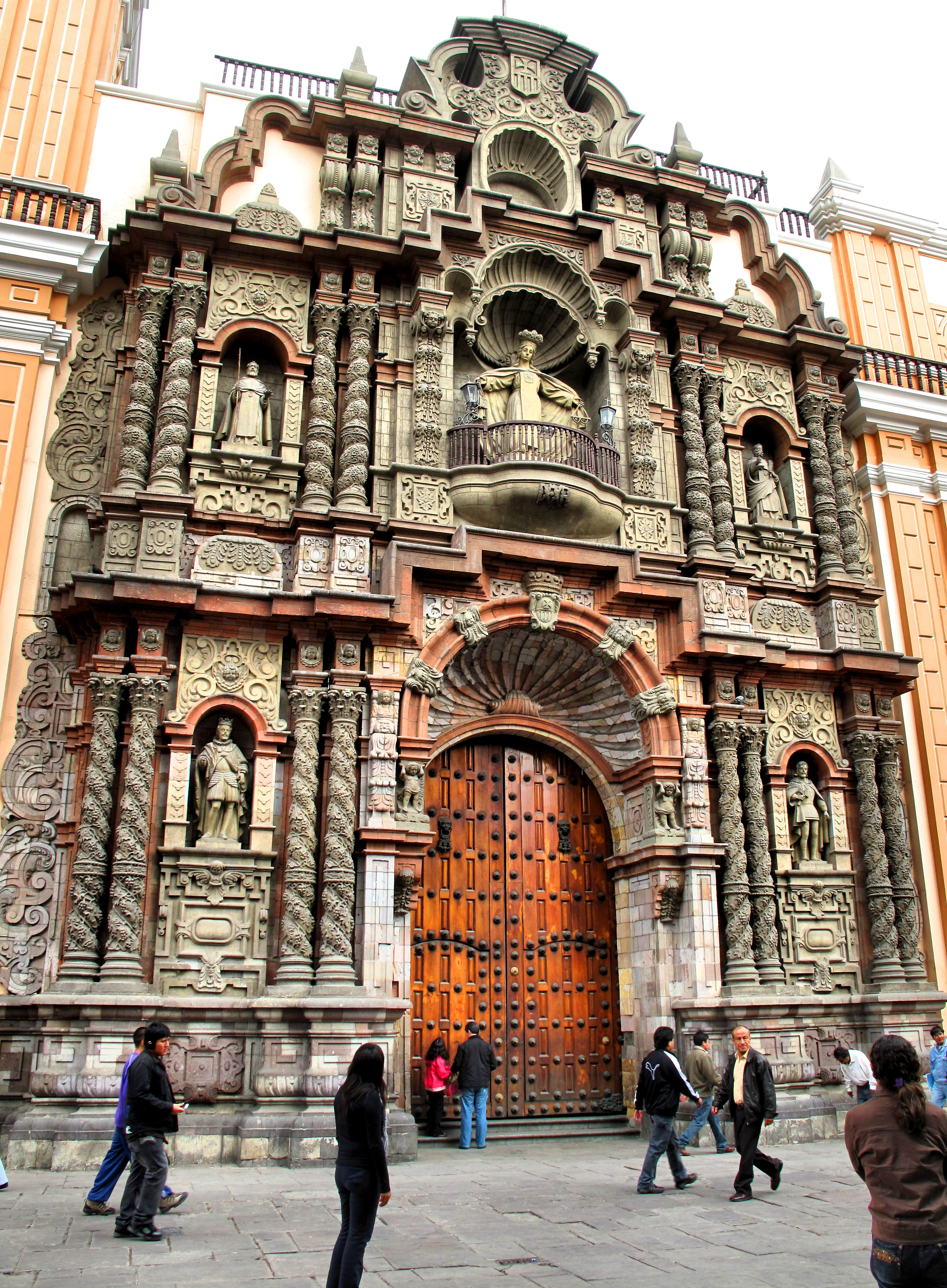
The entrance, in late Spanish Baroque style.

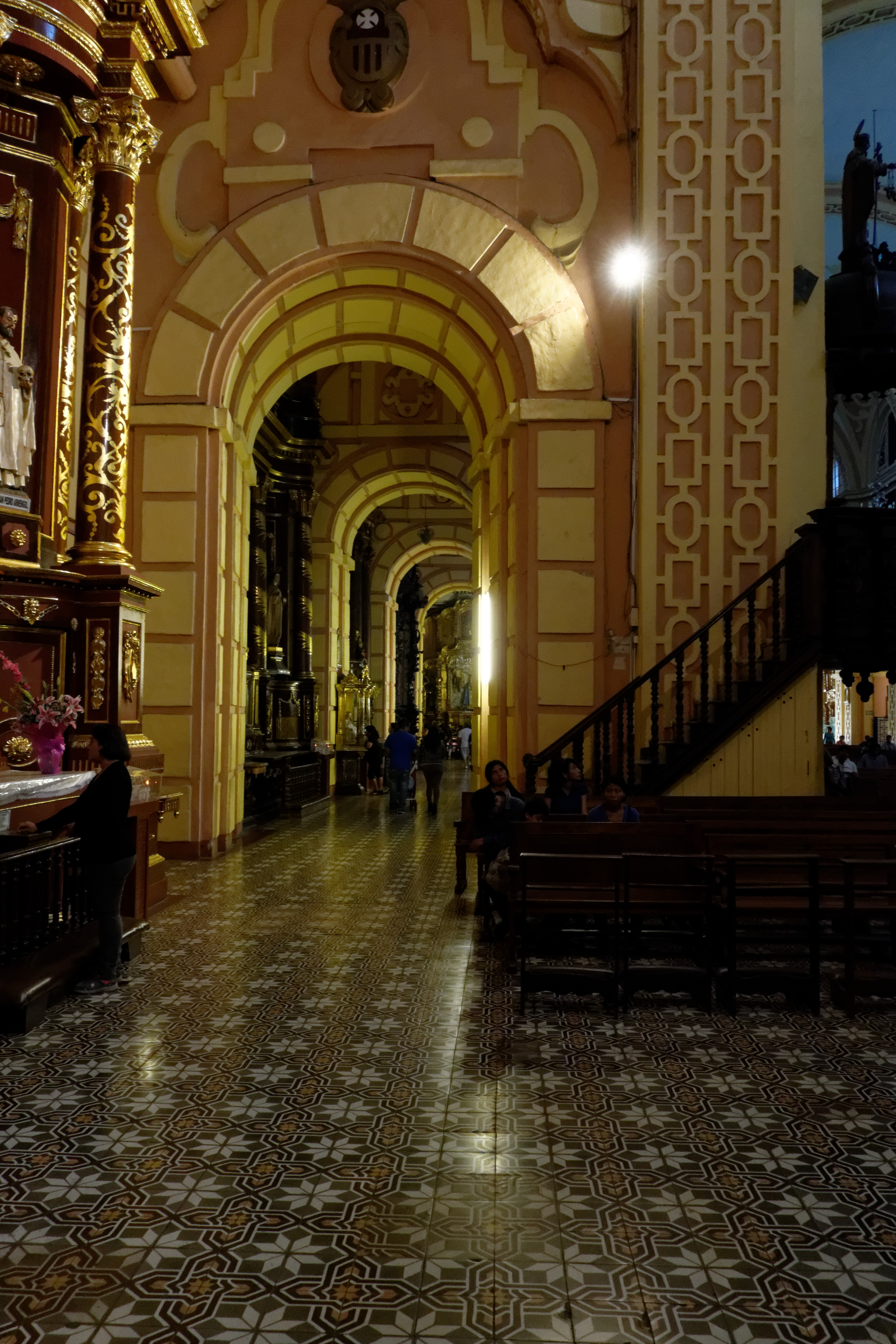
Interior

The convent and the church of Nuestra Señora de la Merced are as old as the city of Lima. According to historic documents, the lands where the convent and the church were built belonged to the Order of the Blessed Virgin Mary of Mercy. On April 13, 1534, Captain Francisco de Becerra donated 6,000 pesos to the Convent of La Natividad de Nuestra Señora (later renamed the Convent of la Madre de Dios de la Merced). Captain Francisco de Becerra and his wife are interred in the church crypt.

The Mercedarians are a religious order that came to Peru to educate the conquered indigenous people. The first church was first made of wood. The current structure is built of adobe and brick. The Baroque entrance was carved in 1591 by Cristóbal Gómez.

In 1589, three years after an earthquake struck the growing city, Alonso de Morales added a square tower to the church, considered to have been the first high-rise structure in colonial Lima. Three years later, the architect Cristóbal Gómez rebuilt the primitive cloister of the convent of Santo Domingo as a model.

The church chapel of La Cofradía de Nuestra Señora de Agua Santa contained many works of art in the style of Juan Gómez de Mora. The convent refectory contained a two vara (about 1.67 m) sculpture of the Virgin of Mercy carved in 1603 by the Sevillian Martín Alonso de Mesa and an earlier (May, 1600) 9 by 5 vara painting by Angelino Medoro.

In 1608, the central nave was remodeled and extended along with two corresponding naves. The redesign resulted in a basilica in the shape of three open naves and a wide crosier. The process involved replacing chapel walls with half domes and summit lanterns, thus creating arches.

This modification of the primitive Isabelline style church from a single nave with lateral chapels, to a three-nave and wide crosier structure significantly transformed the interior of the church. The style was replicated for other Lima churches and spread as an architectural concept throughout South America.

The earthquake of 1609 delayed remodeling work on the church. The work resumed on January 5, 1613, when Alonso de Arenas and Andrés de Espinoza coordinated the construction of the main chapel, two side chapels, and transept. In 1687, another earthquake destroyed parts of the church along with the Mercedarian convent. Francisco Javier Domínguez was charged with the rebuilding effort. In 1696, the current stone entrance was constructed.

Between the earthquakes of 1687 and 1746 that destroyed a significant part of the church and the convent, the following additions were made:

- In 1702, Juan Rojas completed the altarpiece of the Virgin of the Remedies.
- By August 30, 1714, Friar Miguel Adame painted the four evangelists for the chapel of Jesus Nazarene, gilded by Juan José Ramírez Capitán.
- In 1730, the Virgin of Mercy was declared the "Patroness of the Fields of Lima" and taken out for the first time in procession.
- In 1739, engraver Juan Francisco Rosa created the statue of the Lord of Help.

The reconstruction of the church and the convent after the earthquake of 1746 lasted for most of the second half of the 18th century. This reconstruction was also impacted by a devastating fire in the sacristy and other parts of the church on April 24, 1775.

The most important reconstruction work visible today are the following:

- Between 1759 and 1762 - the tower, main staircase, and interior balconies.
- Between 1762 and 1765 - the entrance of Cristóbal Caballero.
- Between 1765 and 1768 - dome ornaments and the sacristy.
- In 1774 - the library.
- In 1775 - further sacristy construction.
- Between 1777 and 1780 - the second floor of the main cloister.
- Between 1781 and 1786 - the portería, altars of the main cloister, and preparation of the paintings of the life of St. Peter Nolasco in the main cloister.
- Between 1783 and 1792 - thirteen of the main cloister paintings on the life of the founder of the order were created by Julián Jayo, under the direction of Friar Gabriel García Cabello. Additional paintings were created in 1786 by Juan de Mata Coronado and in 1792 by Julián Falte.
- Between 1786 and 1798 - the altars of the Virgin of the Costume, St. Raymond Nonnatus, and Jesus Nazarene were built, along with the Chapter Hall. During that same period, the current church bells that announce important religious ceremonies in the church were manufactured and installed.

In 1757, the founder Francisco de León carried the inscription "Be blessed and praised the Sacred Heart of Jesus". In 1775, the founder Pedro Mexía made the "San José", and in 1787, the founder Lima Calero, who resided in Maravillas, oversaw the installation of the main bell (which has a diameter of 1.56m).

Before the proclamation of Independence of Peru, Matías Maestro (who introduced neoclassicism in Lima), rebuilt the altarpiece that was gilded in 1810 by Felix Batlle.

In 1860, the architect Guillermo D'Coudry directed restoration works at the church.

In the early-20th century the façade of the basilica of La Merwced, including the entrance, was covered with a thick layer of plaster resembling a French architectural style. The plaster was removed in 1940 by Emilio Harth-Terr, returning the facade to its original appearance.

=== Reredos and the Virgin of Mercy ===
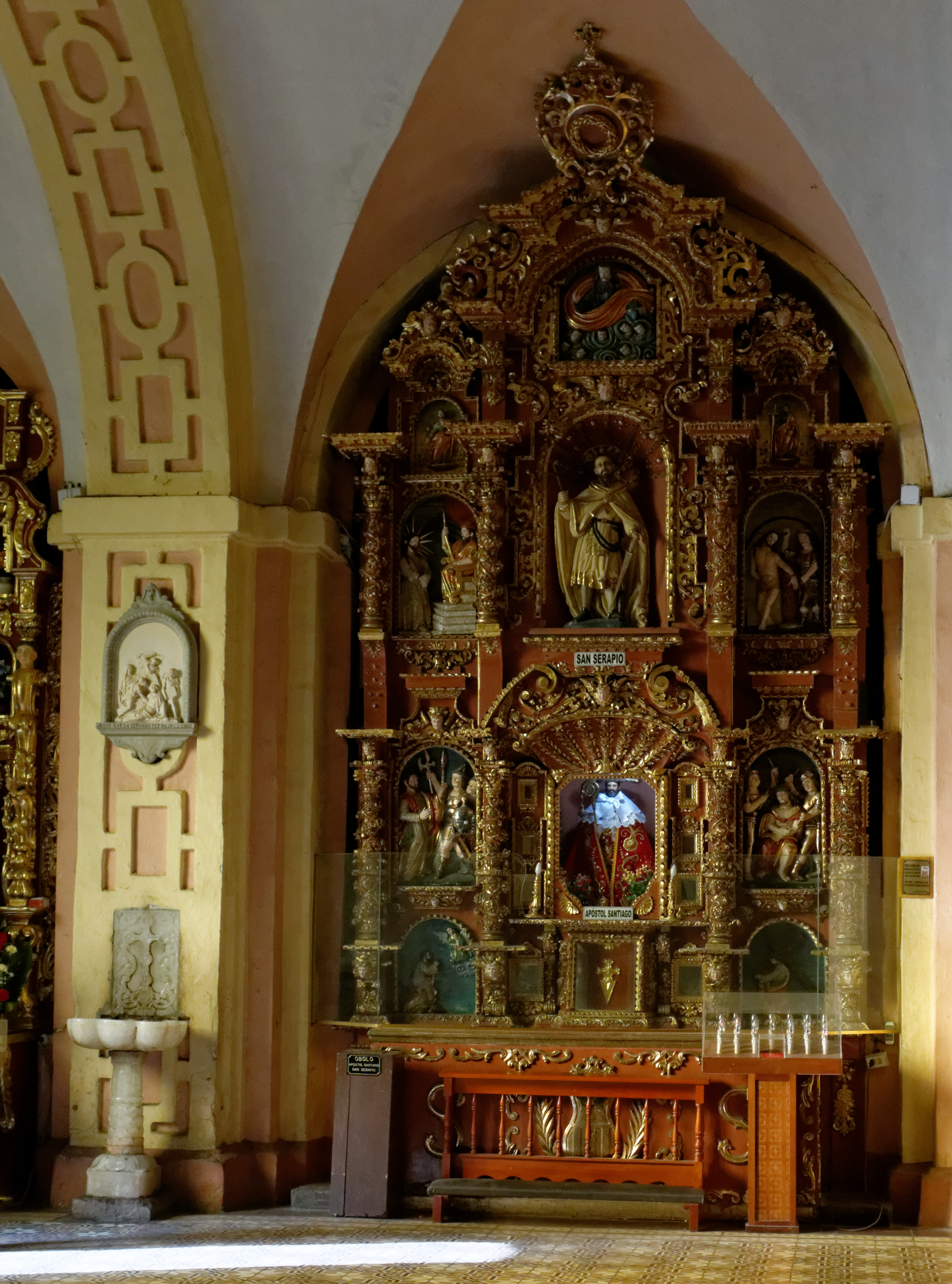
A side reredos

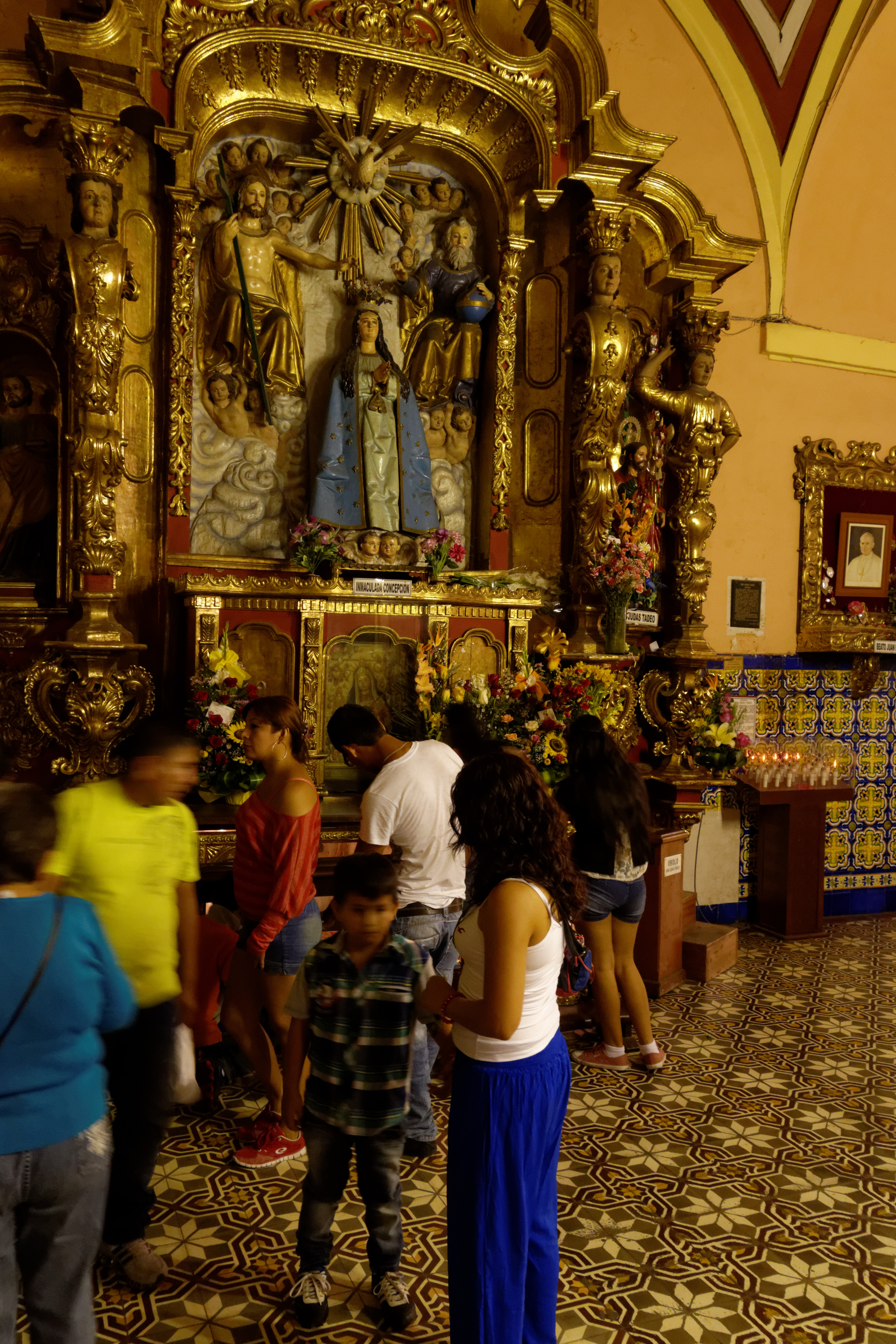
A side reredos and azulejos

The church contains a variety of reredos. The altarpiece is fire-gilded. The center of the altarpiece contains an image of the Virgin of Mercy, declared in 1615 the "heavenly protector of [Lima]." In 1730 the Cabildo named her "Perpetual Patroness of the Fields of Lima,". She also was named patroness of the Arms of Peru by the Constituent Congress in 1823. On September 24, 1921, President Augusto Leguía, together with the Duchess of Goyeneche, bestowed upon her the honorable title of Gran Mariscala (Great Marshal Woman).

The virgin holds the shackles and scapular of her religious order, along with a gold scepter.

The altar of the Holy Christ of Help, a statue made by Juan Martínez Montañés, depicts the supposed conversations of Christ with Priest Urraca.

=== Further information ===
The façade is an example of the Liman Churrigueresque with the statue of the Virgin of Mercy in a central niche surrounded by other images.

The convent now has three cloisters: the main cloister, Cloister of Doctors, and the Novitiate. The main cloister is large and has corner altars that contain baseboards with azulejos. The Cloister of the Doctors is named for a series of reliefs that depict Mercedarians, who were professors of the University of San Marcos. In this cloister, the College of the Virgin of Mercy operated from 1917 to 1972. The main cloister and cloister of the Doctors are separated by a monumental staircase covered by a dome.

The library contains colonial religious books and the chair where the Friar Pedro Urraca sat, now considered a relic. The sacristy hosts the historical Cross of the Conquest brought by the Mercedarians.

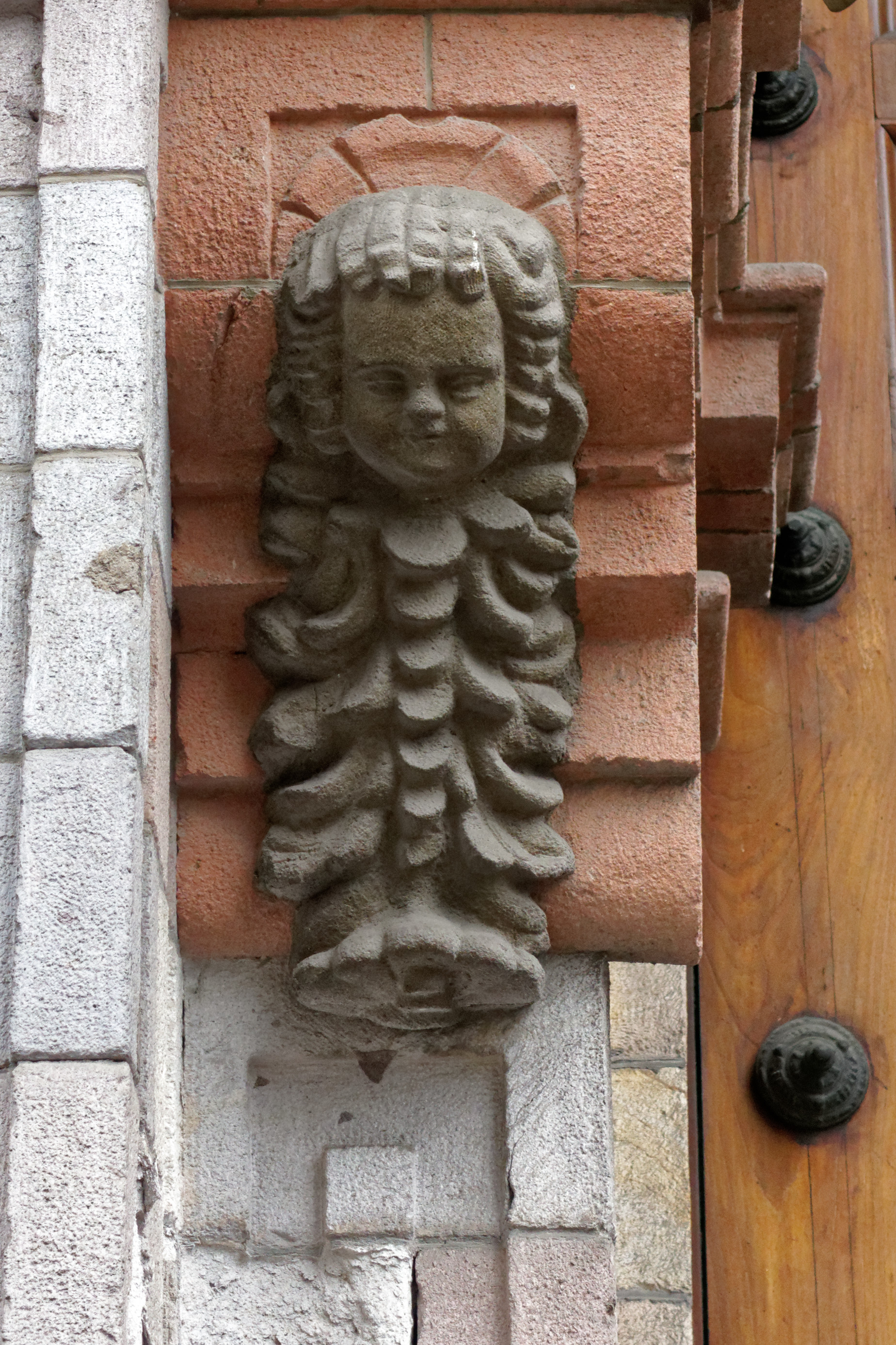
Stone carving

In the Basílica y Convento de la Merced, some niches contain statues depicting the noble indians Lord of Huanca and the Lord of Cachuy and regional invocations of Jesus Crucified.

== Friar Urraca ==
Pedro Urraca was born in Villa de Jadraque in Aragón, Spain, in 1583. At the age of 19, he traveled to Peru. Legends report that the ship he traveled on to Peru was nearly shipwrecked because of a great storm that endangered the lives of the crew. Pedro Urraca offered his life to the Virgin for the safety of the crew and himself. The sea settled and the ship continued to safety in Quito where Urraca began his novitiate. He was next sent to Peru. During his life he wore cilice and iron chains on his body as penance. After thirty years the chains were embedded in the flesh, producing deep sores. Doctors withdrew the chains by order of the confessor. After many years he returned to Spain where he became Spiritual Director for Queen Elisabeth of France, consort of King Philip IV of Spain. Although he was asked to stay at the Court, he returned to Lima and died on August 7, 1657, at the age of 74. His remains are located in the floor of the church, in the nave of the epistle, where an inscription reads: "In this place and under the earth rests the body of the Servant of God Friar Pedro Urraca de the Holy Trinity". His cause for Beatification began in Rome on April 29, 1682. His virtues were proclaimed on January 31, 1981, and he was declared Venerable by Pope John Paul II.

== See also ==
- Plazoleta de la Merced
- 18th-century Western domes

== Bibliography ==
- Collection “Documental del Perú,” Lima Region, Volume XV, Third Edition, April 1973, LA MERCED. Levanta su monumental portada de granito en pleno centro de Lima, pages 42-43.
- "Itinerarios de Lima" by Héctor Velarde, Patronage of Lima, Second Edition, 1990, Iglesia y Convento de La Merced, pages 53–55.
- "Guide to Peru", Handbook for travelers, 6th. Edition, by Gonzalo de Reparaz Ruiz, publisher Ediciones de Arte Rep, Lima - Peru, Book published in English by the Tourism Promotion Fund of Peru - FOPTUR, La Merced. (Church and Convent of), pages 93–95.
