= Centennial of the Independence of Peru =

100th anniversary of Peru

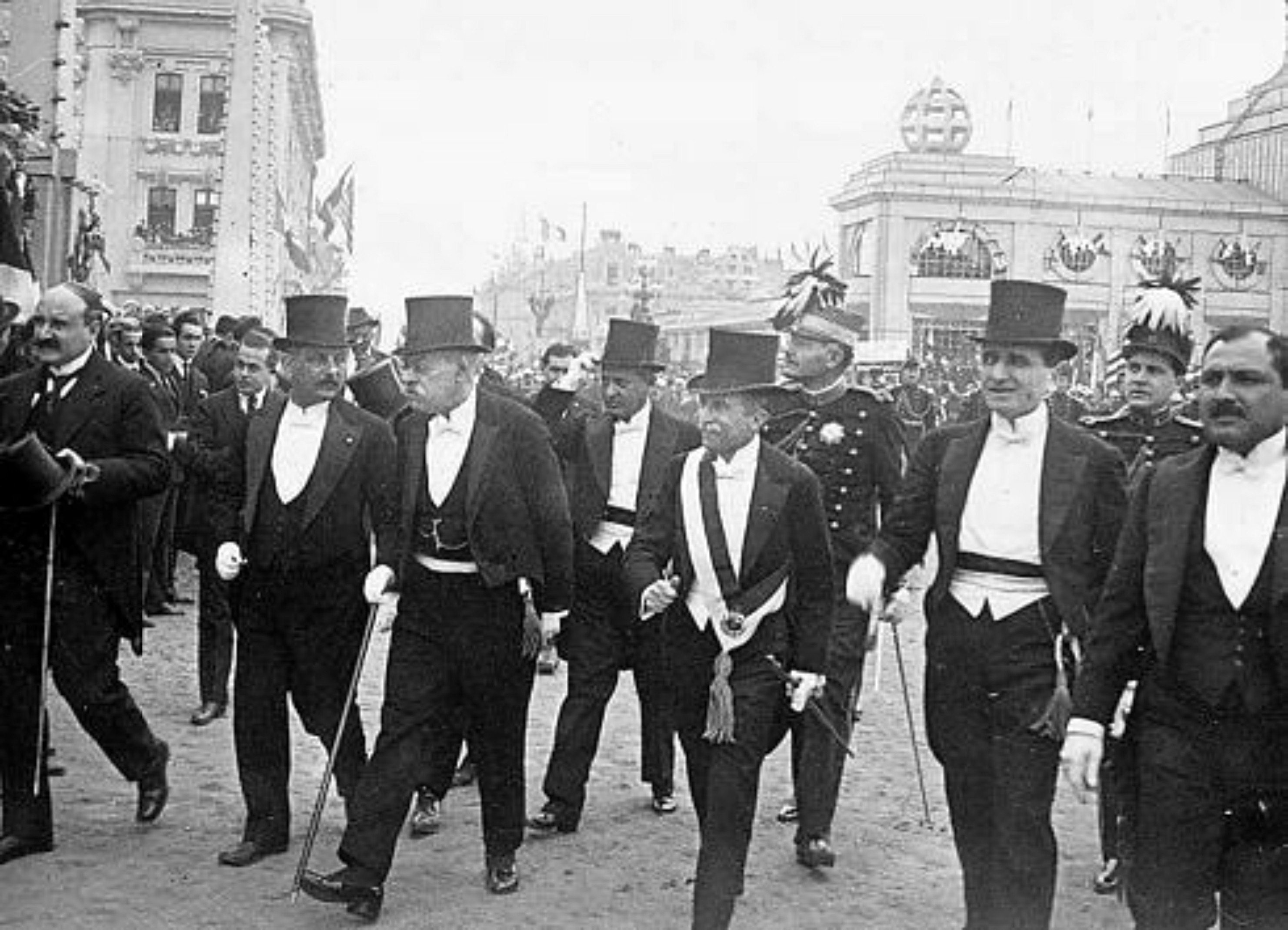
- President Leguía amid celebrations in Lima
- Dates: July 28, 1921 and December 9, 1924
- Location: Peru
- Next event: Sesquicentennial (1971); Bicentennial (2021)
- Major events: 100th anniversary of the adoption of the Declaration of Independence
- Organiser: National Centennial Commission

The Centennial of the Independence of Peru took place on July 28, 1921, as well as on December 9, 1924. To commemorate the hundred years of the country's independence from Spain, large and lavish parties supervised by President Augusto B. Leguía were held.

== Celebrations ==
The city of Lima was decorated for the occasion with electric lights that decorated, among other important buildings, the National Congress, the Government Palace, the Plaza Mayor and the German Tower at the University Park, a gift from the German residents in Lima. Some porticos were also adorned with the coats of arms of the nations with which the emancipation was shared: Ecuador, Colombia, Venezuela, Bolivia and Panama, and which were placed on the avenues most visited by residents and tourists who came for the event.

There were sumptuous parties at the Government Palace, in the clubs, gala horse races, popular festivals, the great military parade, school parades, float parades and a series of inaugurations. One of the most emotional events was undoubtedly the inauguration of the monument to General José de San Martín, in the plaza that has been named after him ever since.

The Municipality of Lima presented the monument of Admiral Bergasse du Petit Thouars, which is in front of the National Radio headquarters and Washington Square. The Peruvian capital was visited by numerous delegations from other countries, motivated by the good international relations that the government of President Leguía had weaved. Subsequently, a book was published in which an account of foreign visits is made, noting not only the number of members of the delegations but also the quality of the characters who came to visit the country.

=== Foreign delegations ===
Saludo al presidente by Daniel Hernández – an oil painting depicting the reception of foreign missions inside the Government Palace by President Augusto Leguía.

Twenty-nine foreign delegations from countries in the Americas, Europe and Asia arrived. Venezuela (whose government mistakenly believed that the Liberator Simón Bolívar had been marginalized from the tributes) and Chile (which was not invited because it had a territorial conflict with Peru) were not represented.

Among the foreign ambassadors and extraordinary envoys were:

Country	Name	Portrait	Head of state
Argentina	Luis Duprat		Hipólito Yrigoyen
Belgium	Paul de Groot		Albert I of Belgium
Bolivia	Abel Iturralde		Bautista Saavedra
Brazil	Silvino Gurgel do Amaral		Epitácio Pessoa
China	Shin Yi Din		Xu Shichang
Colombia	Antonio Gómez Restrepo		Marco Fidel Suárez
Costa Rica	Gregorio Martín		Julio Acosta García
Cuba	Nicolás de Cárdenas y Chappotín		Alfredo Zayas y Alfonso
Denmark	Otto Wadsted		Christian X of Denmark
Dominican Republic	Benjamín Valega		Thomas Snowden
El Salvador	Gregorio Martín		Jorge Meléndez
France	Charles Mangin		Alexandre Millerand
Germany	Hans Paul von Humboldt-Dachroeden		Friedrich Ebert
Guatemala	Paulo Emilio Guedes		Carlos Herrera
Haiti	Victor Kieffer Marchand		Philippe Sudré Dartiguenave
Holy See	Carlo Pietropaoli and Lelio Nicolo Orsini		Pope Benedict XV
Honduras	Gregorio Martín		Rafael López Gutiérrez
Italy	Guglielmo Mengarini		Victor Emmanuel III of Italy
Japan	Gonshiro Nishi		Emperor Taishō
Mexico	Antonio Caso Andrade		Álvaro Obregón
Netherlands	Wilhelm d'Artillac Grill		Wilhelmina of the Netherlands
Nicaragua	Leoncio I. de Mora		Diego Manuel Chamorro
Norway	Harvard Huitfeldt Bachke		Haakon VII of Norway
Panama	Eduardo Chiari		Belisario Porras Barahona
Portugal	José María Pereira		António José de Almeida
Spain	Cipriano Muñoz, 2nd Count of la Viñaza		Alfonso XIII
Sweden	Carlos F. Hultgren		Gustaf V
United Kingdom	Douglas Cochrane		George V
United States	Albert Douglas		Warren G. Harding
Uruguay	José Espalter		Baltasar Brum

=== Foreign gifts ===
Some foreign residents in Lima, with or without the help of their natural governments, made the decision to gift monuments to the city, at the time characterized for its progressive and French-style character. The offerings of these monuments were made in 1921, but not all the gifts were ready that year: some began to be built on that date, but as their execution took time, they were delivered progressively until 1926, in a series of ceremonies. The original idea had been that these gifts would be delivered between 1921 and 1924, that is, between the centenary of the proclamation of the Independence of Peru by the Liberator José de San Martín, which took place on July 28, 1921, and of the Battle of Ayacucho, celebrated on December 9, 1924, which sealed the independence from Spain. The resident colonies in Peru that offered gifts were German, French, Belgian, American, Chinese, Japanese, English, Italian and Spanish. There were also countries that gave gifts. Such was the case of Argentina, which after the ceremony on July 28, 1921, left the Tucuman horses, their harness and the spears. with which the soldiers that the homeland of San Martín had sent to remember the liberating feat, paraded.

Country / Colony	Name	Author	Inauguration date	Location	Image
Belgium	El estibador	Constantin Meunier	1926	Belgium Plaza, Leguía Avenue	
Brazil	Palm trees			Leguía Avenue	
China	Fuente China	Ettore Graziosi and Valmore Gemignani; Gaetano Moretti (architect)		Park of the Exhibition	
Ecuador	Monumento en homenaje a la memoria del Mariscal Antonio José de Sucre	David Lozano	c. 1924	Parque de la Reserva	
France	Estatua de La Libertad	René Bertrand-Boutée	1926	Placita de la Recoleta	
Germany	Torre Alemana	Friedrich Jordan Barkholtz	July 10, 1923	University Park	
Italy	Museum of Italian Art	Gaetano Moretti	November 11, 1923	Neptune Park	
Japan	Monumento a Manco Cápac	David Lozano	April 5, 1926	Manco Cápac Plaza	
Spain	Arco Morisco		July 17, 1924	Parque de la Amistad	
United Kingdom	Estadio Nacional		July 29, 1923	Santa Beatriz, Lima	
United States	George Washington statue	Jean-Antoine Houdon	July 4, 1922	Washington Park, Leguía Avenue	
United States	Fuente de los Atlantes	Gertrude Vanderbilt Whitney	August 6, 1924	Leguía Avenue	

== See also ==
- Sesquicentennial of the Independence of Peru, 1974
- Bicentennial of the Independence of Peru, 2021
- Peruvian culture
