= The Three Graces (Whitney) =

Outdoor fountain and sculpture in Montreal, Quebec, Canada

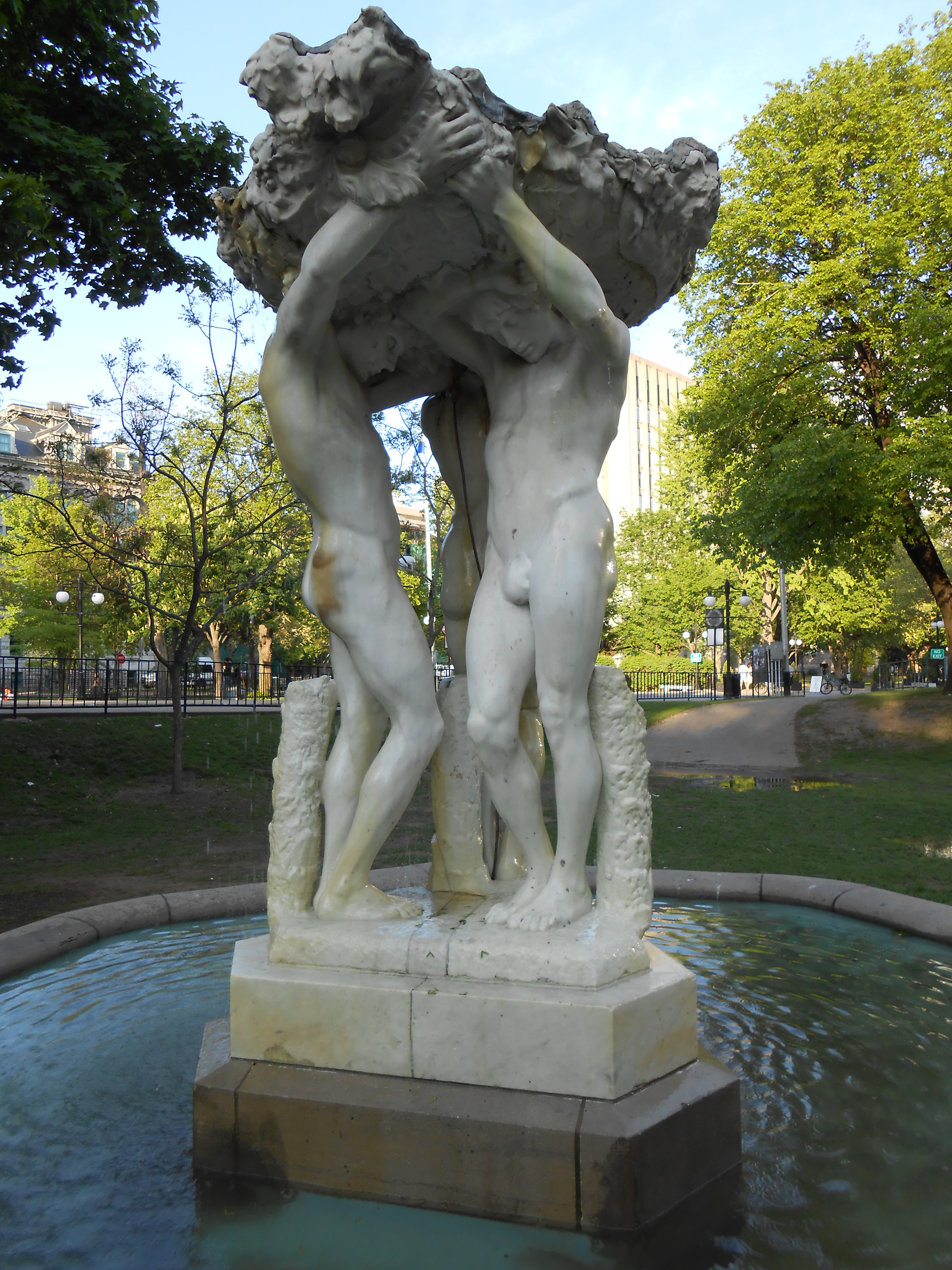
- The sculpture in 2013
- Artist: Gertrude Vanderbilt Whitney
- Year: 1931
- Medium: Fountain; sculpture
- Location: Montreal, Quebec, Canada; 45°30′17″N 73°34′37″W
- Owner: McGill University

The Three Graces, also known as Carytid Fountain Group, Friendship Fountain, The Three Bares, and Three Bares Fountain, is an outdoor fountain and sculpture by Gertrude Vanderbilt Whitney, installed in 1931 at Montreal's McGill University, in Quebec, Canada.

== Description and history ==
Whitney's caryatid figure dated back to 1913 when she won an award for it at the Paris Salon and from the National Association of Women Painters and Sculptors. It had been modeled for the Arlington Hotel in Washington, D.C. The original hotel was demolished in 1912 to make room for a larger hotel, that was to include Whitney's caryatid, but its funding fell through and it was never built. The figure was exhibited at the Panama–Pacific International Exposition in San Francisco in 1915, and a bronze version of it was erected in Lima, Peru in 1924. At the time of the fountain's unveiling, it was draped in a Union Jack and the Stars and Stripes, Whitney, in poor health and in mourning over the death of her husband Harry Payne Whitney, did not attend. She also missed the unveiling of her Titanic Memorial in Washington D.C. three days before.

== See also ==
- 1931 in art
- Lamp of the Three Graces
