= Débardeur du port d'Anvers =

Sculpture by Constantin Meunier

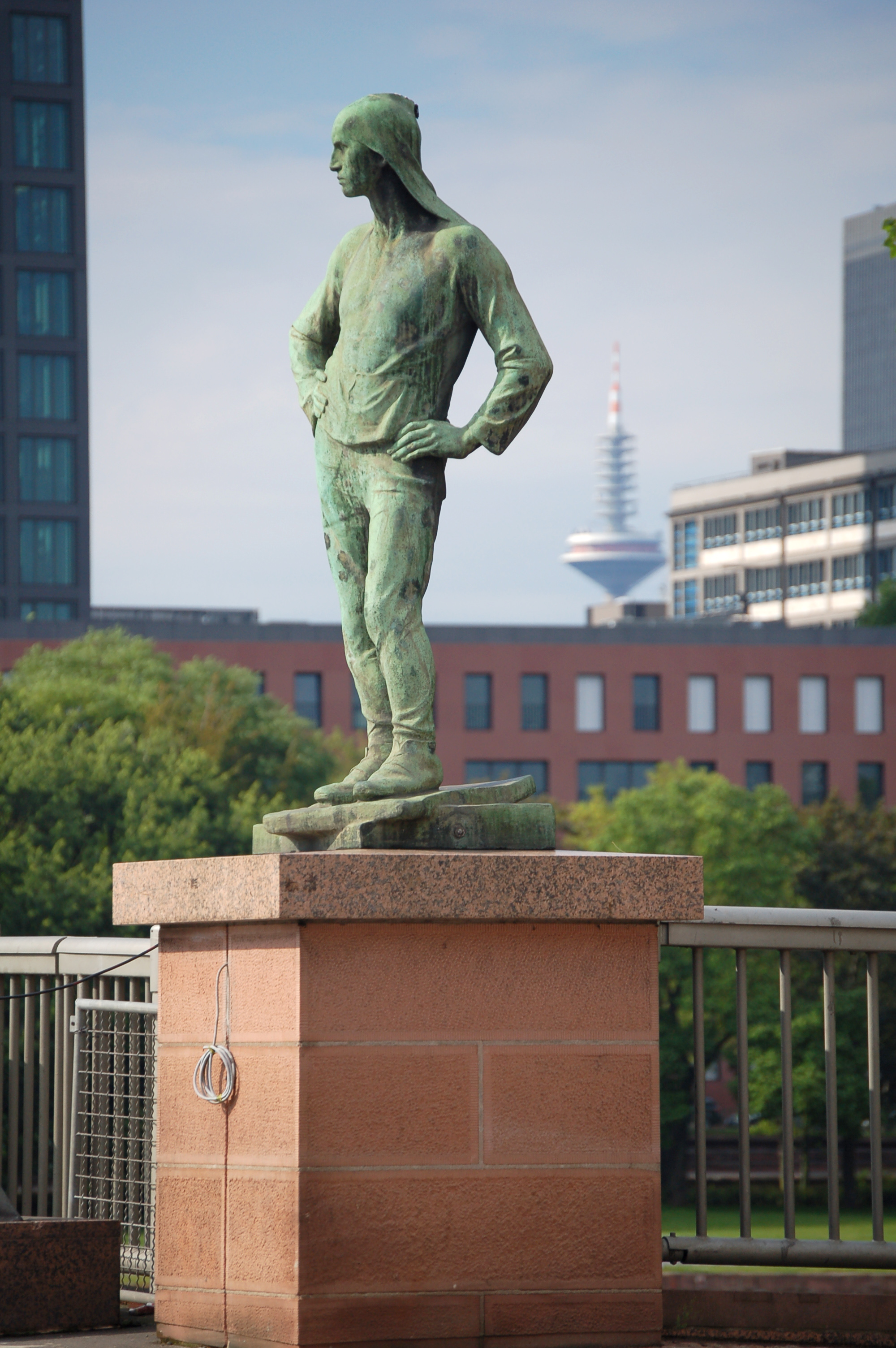
- The statue in Frankfurt
- Interactive map of Débardeur du port d'Anvers
- Location: Frankfurt am Main, Germany
- Material: Bronze
- Completion date: 1890

Débardeur du port d'Anvers, also known as Der Hafenarbeiter, is a bronze sculpture created by Belgian artist Constantin Meunier in 1890.

== Description ==
The figure is slightly larger than life-size, reaching about 2 metres in height, and represents a stevedore in work clothes, in contraposto position. To protect his neck from coal dust and rubbing while carrying jute bags, he wears a kind of hood as neck protection.

== History ==
Débardeur du port d'Anvers is based on a small wax sculpture 48 centimeters high made in 1885 in Brussels in the Salon des XX. In 1889 the plaster statue was presented in Paris at the Salon of the National Society of Fine Arts.

The bronze copy of the first statuette was acquired by the French State in 1890. Other copies in different sizes of the sculpture have been made since 1893, and can be found in Antwerp (where it is considered a symbol of the port city), Stockholm, Dresden, Copenhagen and Lima.

=== Der Hafenarbeiter ===
The original sculpture stands at the southern head of the Friedensbrücke bridge in Frankfurt am Main and is a reminder that immediately downstream of the bridge on its northern side is the former Frankfurt Westhafen, which was in operation from 1885 to 1999. The sculpture is a base of the entrepreneur and then head of the Cassella works, Leo Gans. For a bronze copy in Frankfurt of another Meunier sculpture, Der Sower, located in the Günthersburgpark, provided in 1899 some 150,000 German gold marks.

Since 1910, the sculpture has been in its current location. From 1950 to 1955 it was temporarily placed in front of the Städel Art Institute for construction work on the bridge.

=== El estibador ===
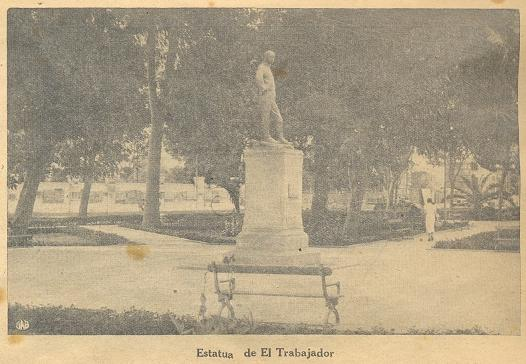
The statue in the 1920s.

In 1921, during the second presidency of Augusto B. Leguía, the Centennial of the Independence of Peru was celebrated and many colonies of foreign residents decided to grant gifts in the form of monuments to the Peruvian State. In the case of the Belgians, a copy of this sculpture called El estibador, or El estibador belga, was made on a granite pedestal two metres high, which was located on the first block of Leguía Avenue, in the Plaza Bélgica, and inaugurated in 1926.

== Gallery ==
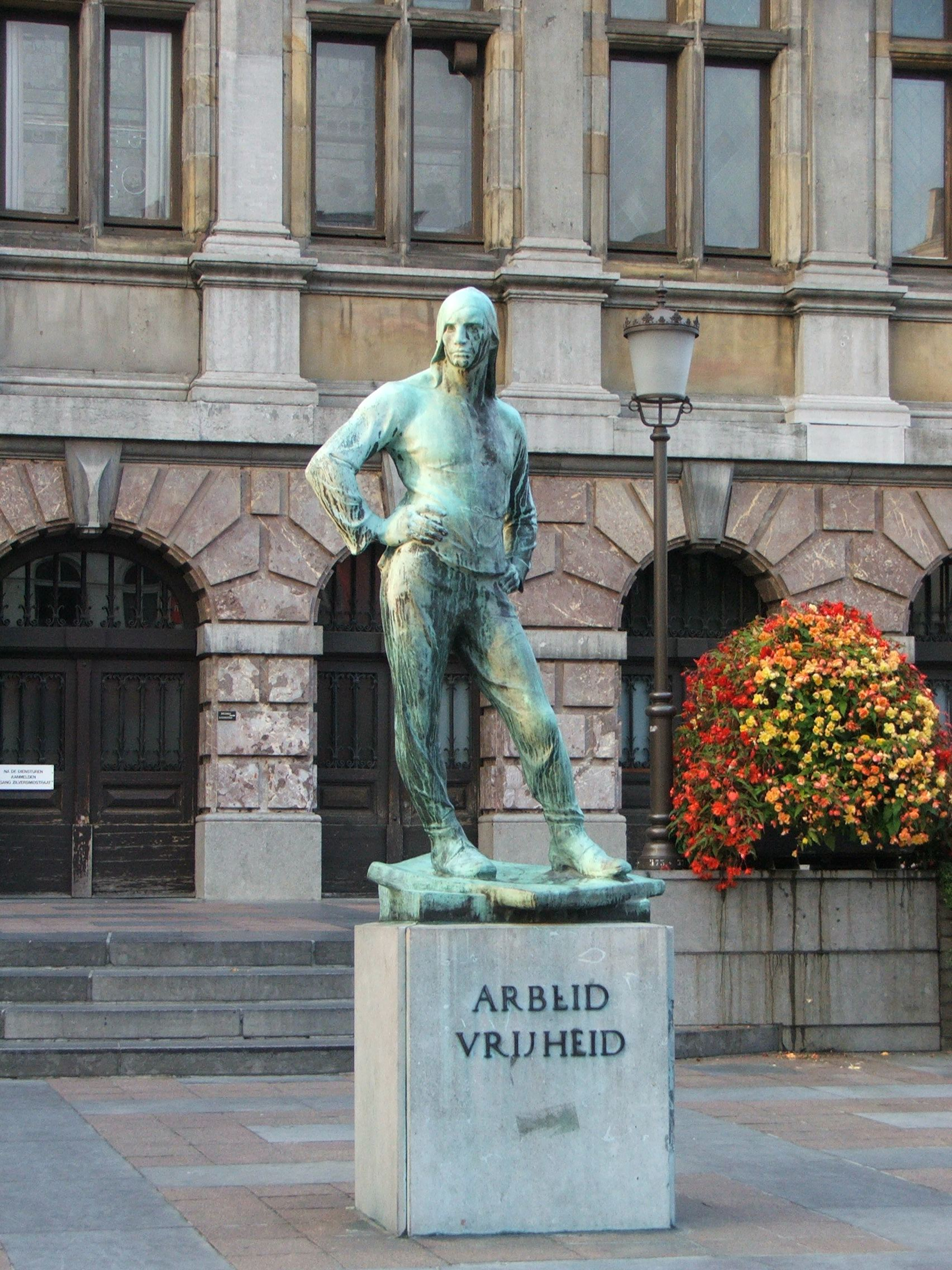
Dokwerker, Antwerp

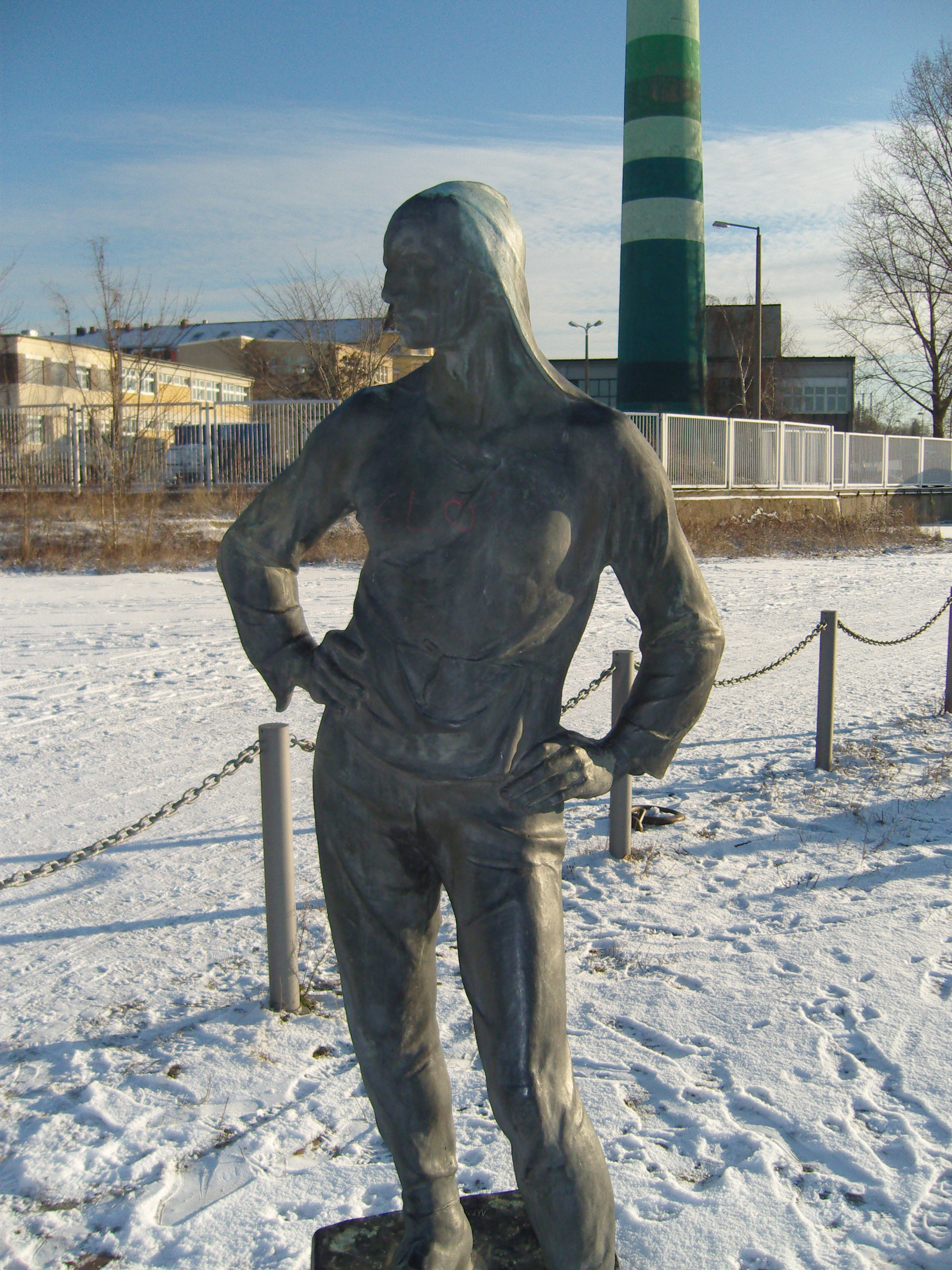
Lastenträger, Dresden

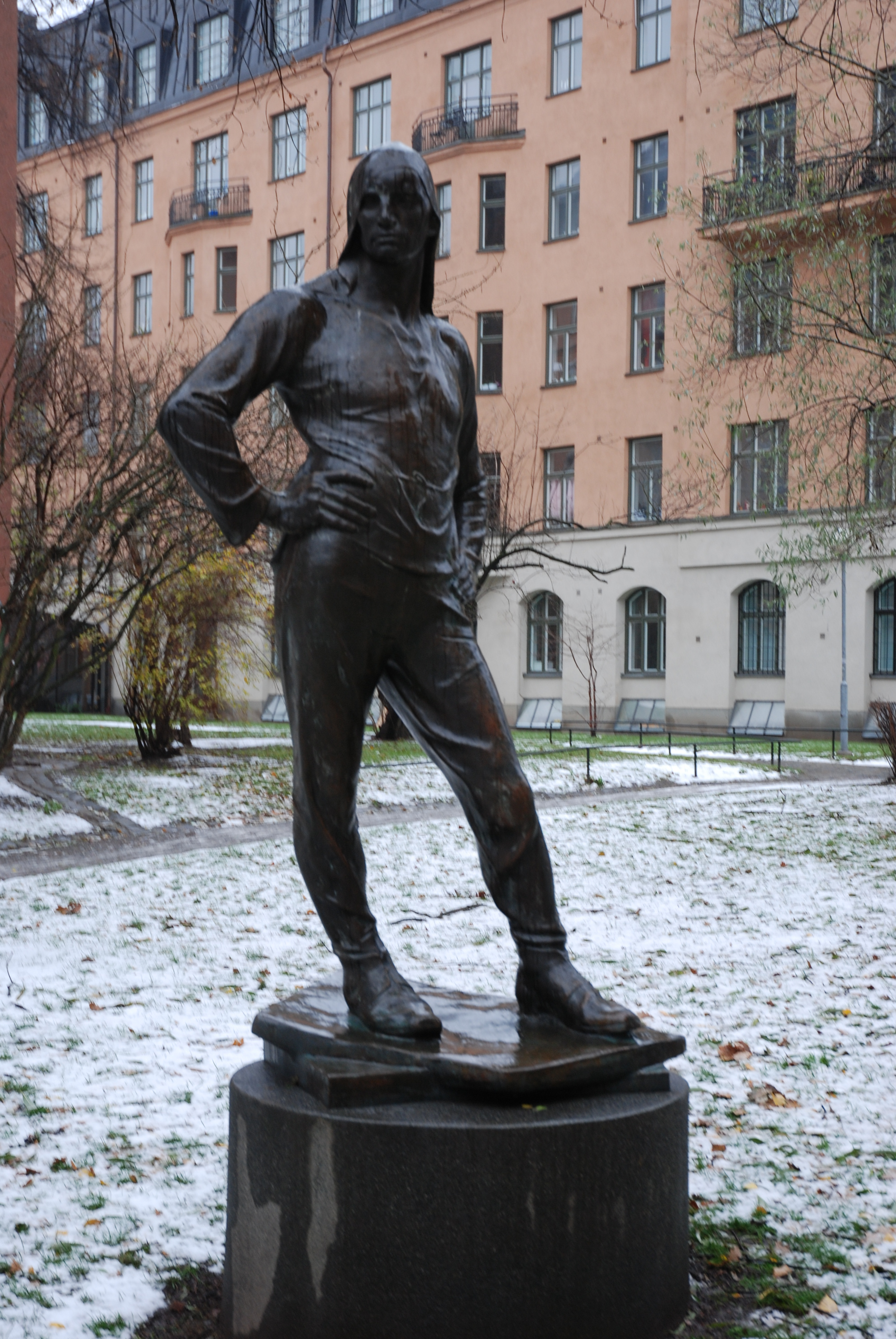
Hamnarbetare, Stockholm

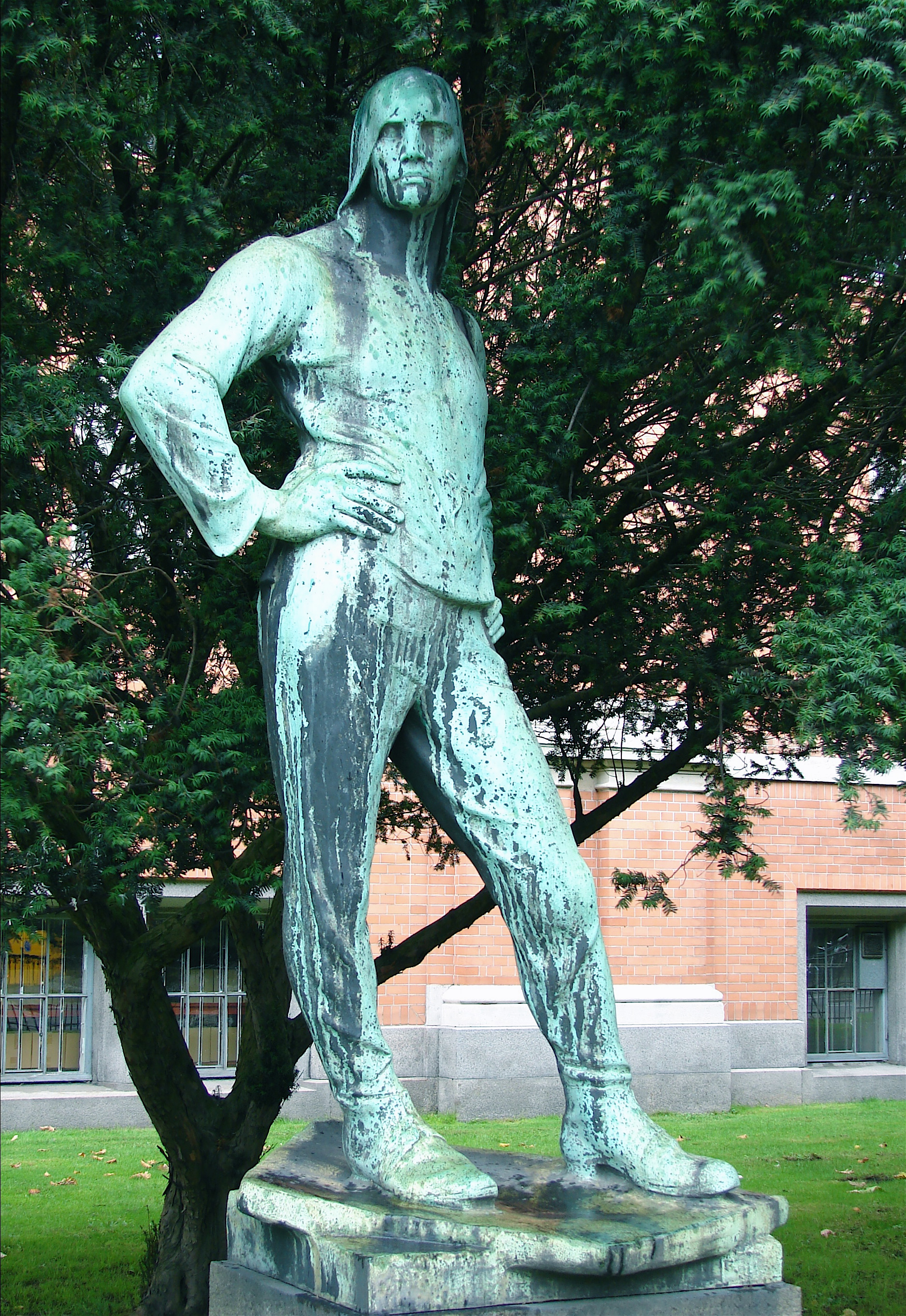
Havnearbejder, Copenhagen

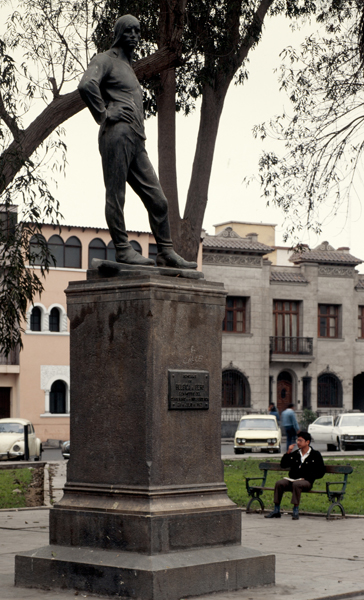
El estibador, Lima
