= Plaza Manco Cápac =

Plaza in Lima

Coordinates: 12°03′50″S 77°01′48″W

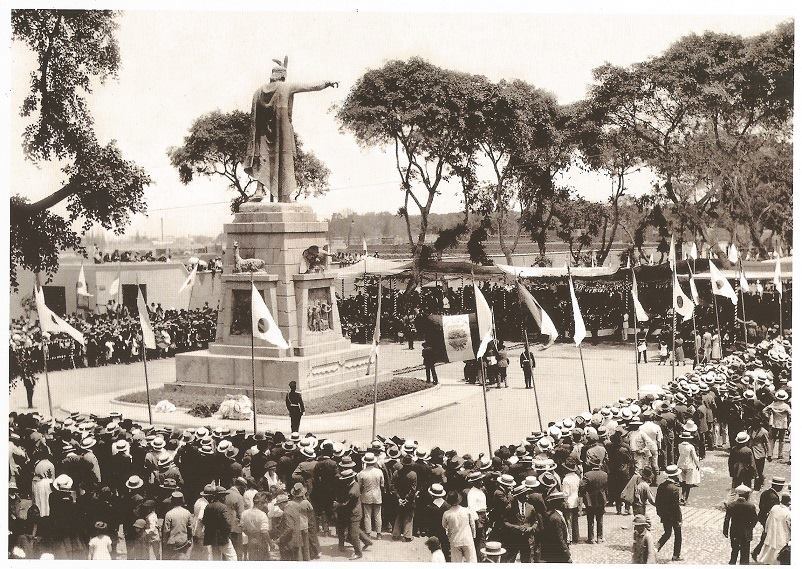
The plaza's inauguration in 1926

The Plaza Manco Cápac, formerly the Plaza Leguía, is a public square in Lima. Formerly named after president Augusto B. Leguía, its current name comes from Manco Cápac, the first Sapa Inca of Cuzco.

== Overview ==
It is located in the district of La Victoria. It is located at the crossroads formed by avenues Bauzate y Meza, Iquitos, Manco Cápac and 28 de Julio. The statue of Manco Cápac, a gift from the Japanese colony for the centenary of the independence of Peru, is located in the centre of the plaza. The statue was commissioned from sculptor David Lozano.

== History ==
The plaza was inaugurated on April 5, 1926, as part of the celebrations regarding the 100th anniversary of the independence of Peru, and the statue of Manco Cápac, previously located near the Plaza Grau, was placed on the site in 1933.

The square also featured an obelisk in honor of President Augusto B. Leguía, which was later removed.

In 1978, the King and Queen of Spain, Juan Carlos I and Sofia, visited Peru, taking a floral offering to the plaza's monument on November 23.

A wall was built around the plaza to prevent crimes such as prostitution, and stood in the site for six years until its demolition in 2019. A theme park based on the Incan Empire was also planned at one point, but the idea was eventually abandoned.

== See also ==
- Centennial of the Independence of Peru
