= Museum of Congress and the Inquisition =

Museum in Peru

Coordinates: 12°02′53″S 77°01′35″W

- Museo del Congreso y la inquisición
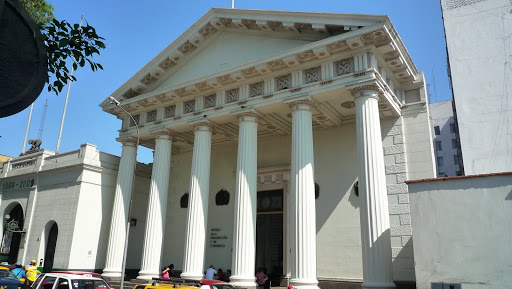
- Established: 26 July 1968
- Location: Jirón Junín 548, Lima

The Museum of Congress and the Inquisition (Spanish: Museo del Congreso y la inquisición), also known as the Monumental Museum of the Inquisition and Congress (Spanish: Museo Monumental de la Inquisición y del Congreso), is a museum located at the former headquarters of the Tribunal of the Holy Office of the Inquisition in the neighbourhood of Barrios Altos, part of the historic centre of Lima, Peru. Located at the fifth block of Jirón Junín, next to the Plaza Bolívar, it is dedicated to the histories of both the Tribunal and the Congress of Peru.

== History ==
The building served as the headquarters of the Tribunal of the Holy Office of the Inquisition during the Viceroyalty of Peru. During this period, the tribunal proved popular with the city, as opposition to torture did not become prevalent until after the 17th century. From its establishment in 1569 until its abolition by the Trienio Liberal in 1820, a year before the independence of Peru was proclaimed by José de San Martín in Lima, it processed a total of 1,474 people, with 32 of them executed.

After independence, it housed the first Constituent Congress of Peru, later housing the Senate of Peru until it moved to the newly constructed Legislative Palace in 1939. Prior to the Senate's move, the building was one of the locations involved during the coup d'état attempt of 1909: after local army troops arrived to disperse the crowd with gunfire, the building was damaged and a number of conspirators sought refuge in the building, including Carlos de Piérola, one of the leaders of the insurrection. Starting in 1943, the Public Library of the Chamber of Deputies operated in the building until the museum was inaugurated on July 26, 1968.

The museum—part of the Cultural heritage of Peru—is temporarily closed since May 2016 due to restoration works. At the time of its closure, it was the most visited museum in the city. A restoration project valued at S/. 13 million was announced in 2023, being defended by Congress after it was criticised for its value.

== See also ==
- Legislative Palace (Peru)
- Plaza Bolívar, Lima
- Barrios Altos
