= Legislative Palace (Peru) =

Government building in Lima, Peru

- Palacio Legislativo
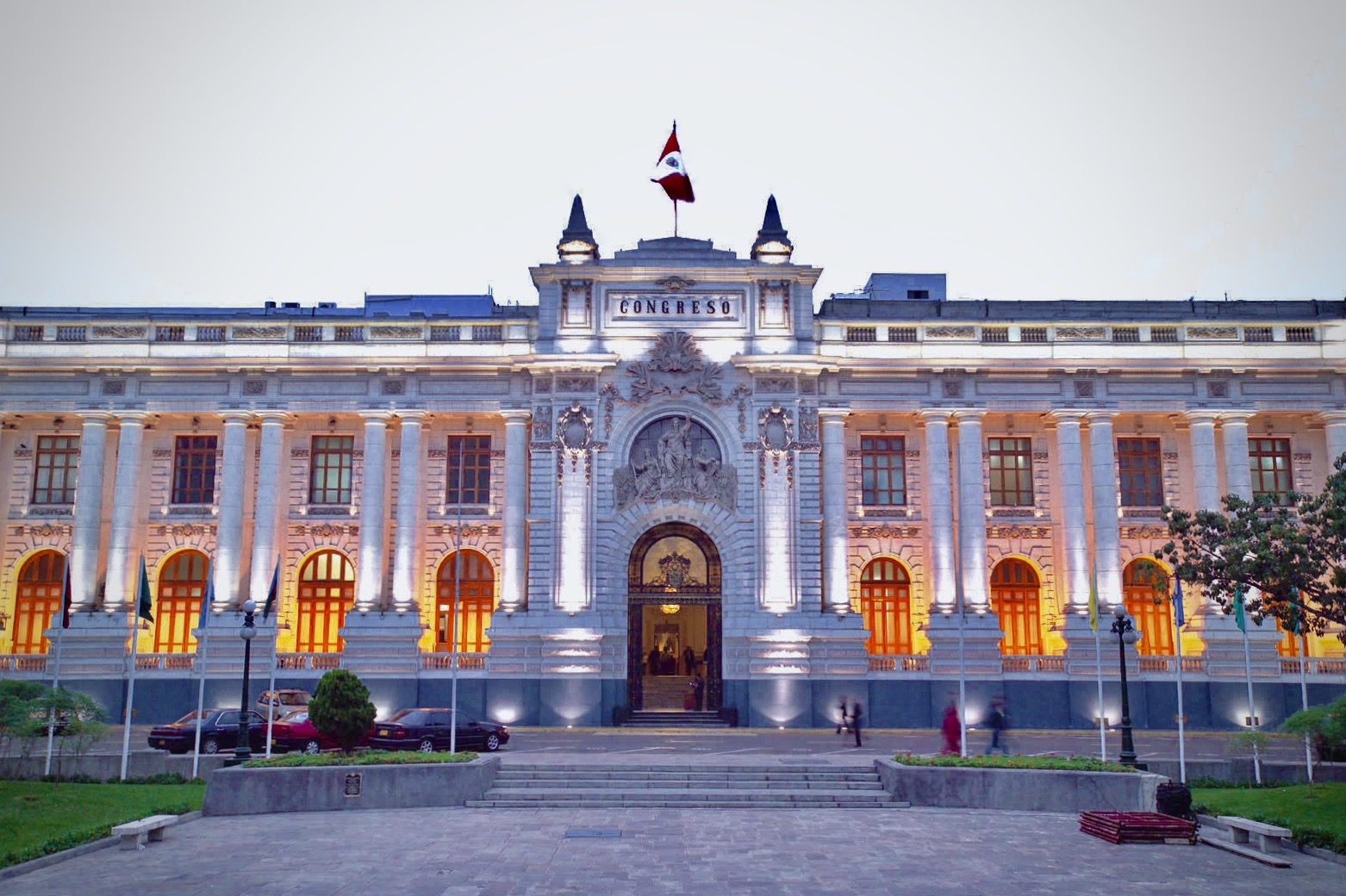
- Interactive map of the Legislative Palace area

General information
- Architectural style: Beaux-Arts
- Location: Lima, Peru
- Coordinates: 12.0480°S 77.0253°W
- Construction started: September 24, 1906
- Completed: 1936; 90 years ago

Design and construction
- Architects: Emilio Robert; Ricardo de Jaxa Malachowski

Website
- congreso.gob.pe

The Legislative Palace (Spanish: Palacio Legislativo) is a government building that serves as the seat of the Congress of Peru, the legislative branch of the Peruvian government. Located at Ayacucho (formerly Urubamba) street, it lies next to next to the Bolivar Square and forms part of the neighbourhood of Barrios Altos, itself part of the historic centre of Lima.

The palace contains the congressional chambers, the Raúl Porras Barrenechea Hall; the Hall of the Lost Steps; and the offices of the congressional leaders, commissions, and parliamentary groups. This building houses the sessions of Congress as well as the inauguration speech of the president.

Located behind the building is José Faustino Sánchez Carrión Square (Spanish: Plaza José Faustino Sánchez Carrión), a public square named after the pro-independence politician and maintained by Congress.

== History ==
The site was originally the location of San Juan de la Penitencia, a casa de recogimiento built under the government of Viceroy Andrés Hurtado de Mendoza, 3rd Marquis of Cañete, and established in 1550 to house creole and mestiza women orphaned by the civil wars of the conquistadores. In 1577, Viceroy Francisco de Toledo granted the site to the University of San Marcos, which occupied it throughout the viceregal period.

On September 20, 1822, the Constituent Congress was installed in the building, as established in its provisional internal regulations. In the meantime, the university temporarily moved to the Colegio de San Pedro. During that time, the Congress also occupied certain rooms of the old premises that belonged to the Inquisition, deactivated in 1820. The Senate was established in that building from September 1, 1829, the date on which the first ordinary session was installed. Previously, on July 20, 1829, the first preparatory meeting of the Senate was held.

On January 19, 1869, Congress issued a legislative resolution authorising then president José Balta to order the construction of a legislative palace. On April 26, 1873, Congress again approved the authorisation for the construction of said palace, also pointing out the need to also build a building for the executive branch of Peru. However, neither of these requests could be met because of the economic situation that the country was facing (decline of the guano boom) and the War of the Pacific. Before this confrontation, on November 7, 1878, Congress suspended the effects of its resolution issued in 1873.

Construction on a new legislative building began in 1904 based on the design of the French architect Emilio Robert. To make construction possible, the building—then used by the Charity of Lima as a hospital—and its adjacent Church of Saint Mary of Charity (Spanish: Santa María de la Caridad) were demolished in 1916. The latter had been established in 1562.

While the building served several political functions over the following decades of construction, it was not permanently occupied until 1938 during the presidency of Óscar R. Benavides. In 2007, the building was damaged due to the strong earthquake that took place on August 15, leading to the temporary closure of the third floor.

== See also ==
- Historic Centre of Lima
- Congress of Peru
