= Francisco de Becerra =

Spanish nobleman

- Born: 1510s Medellín, Extremadura, Spain
- Died: 16th century Brazil
- Military career
- Allegiance: Spain
- Rank: Captain

Francisco de Becerra (1510s, Medellín, Extremadura, Spain - ?, Brazil) was a Spanish nobleman, served as captain in the Spanish Army, during the conquest of the New World.

== Biography ==
Born in Extremadura in the 1510s, Becerra was commander of the brigantine who brought to Mencía Calderón in 1550. On that trip Becerra was accompanied by his wife Isabel, daughter of Álvaro Contreras y Carvajal. He lost his life on the same trip, due to a shipwreck in Mbiazá, Brazil. His wife and children managed to save their lives.
