= Plaza Bolívar, Lima =

Cultural heritage site in Peru

Coordinates: 12.0476°S 77.0260°W

Bolívar Square
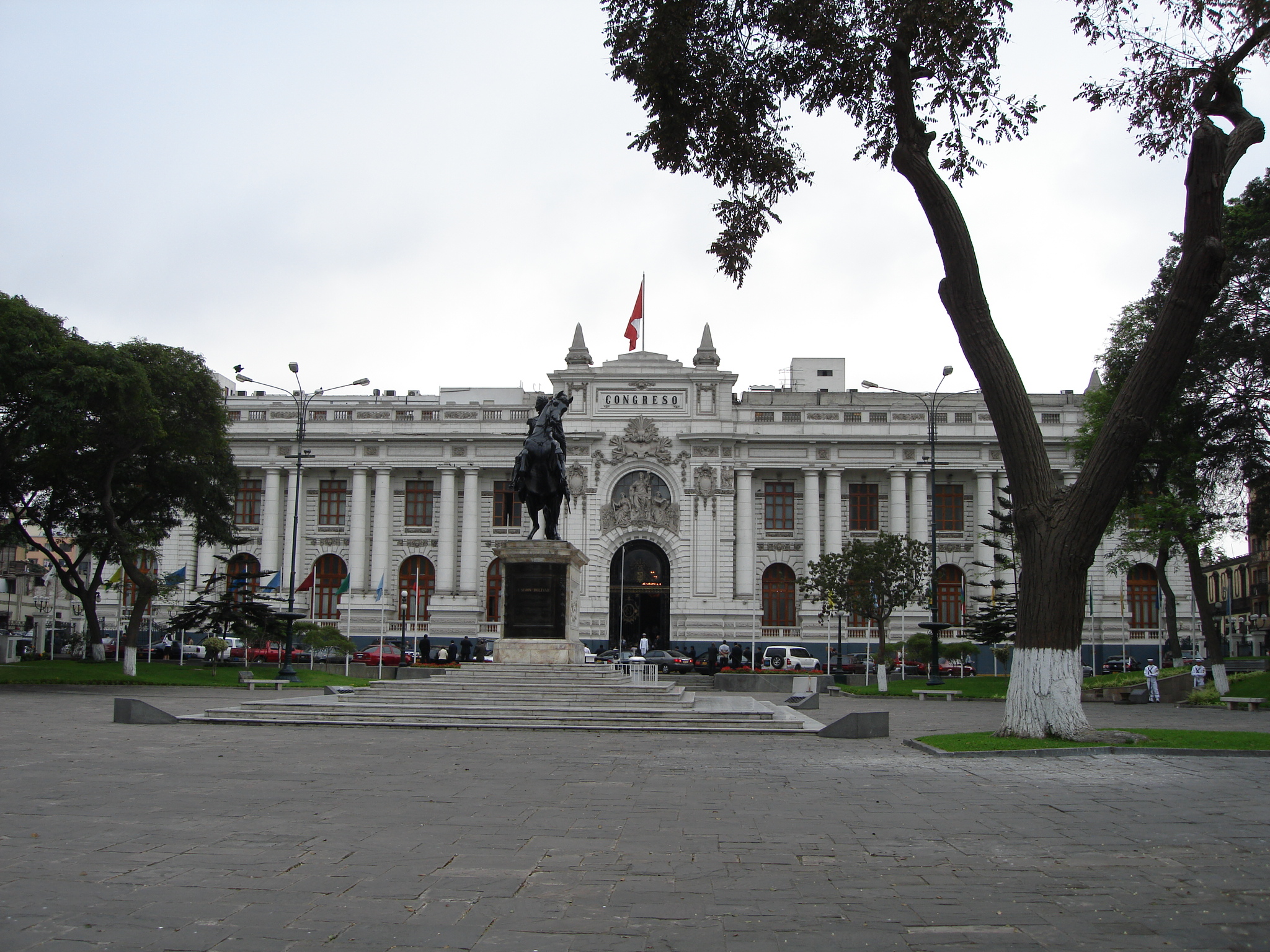

- Location within Lima
- Location: Lima, Peru

History
- Built: 16th century

UNESCO World Heritage Site
- Official name: Plaza Bolívar
- Type: Non-movable
- Criteria: Monument
- Designated: 1991
- Part of: Historic Centre of Lima
- Reference no.: 500

Bolívar Square (Spanish: Plaza Bolívar), also known as Congress Square (Plaza del Congreso) or Inquisition Square (Plaza de la Inquisición), is a public square located at the second block of Abancay Avenue, in the neighbourhood of Barrios Altos in Lima, Peru. It is three blocks east of the city's main square and forms part of the city's historic centre. Its other names come from the Legislative Palace, which serves as the seat of the Congress of Peru and the Former Tribunal of the Inquisition, a museum in the site which once housed both the tribunal and the senate.

Gatherings and parades are held at the plaza during national holidays because it is named for Simón Bolívar, who is considered the liberator of the country.

== History ==
The square was originally known as the Square of the Three Cardinal Virtues (Spanish: Plaza de las tres Virtudes Cardinales) up until the late 16th century, after which it became better known after the Tribunal of the Holy Inquisition, located there.

In 1821, José de San Martín declared the Independence of Peru in this square, as he had previously done in the Plaza de Armas, La Merced, and Santa Ana. Because of this, it took the nickname of Constitution Square (Spanish: Plaza de la Constitución) after the Constituent Congress. A decree of July 6, 1822, ordered the erection of a column in the middle of the square that would be crowned with an equestrian statue of San Martín, which was not acted upon and replaced with another order for the erection of monument of Simón Bolívar on February 12, 1825.

Expansion works for Abancay Avenue in 1949 transformed the original shape of the square.

== Gallery ==
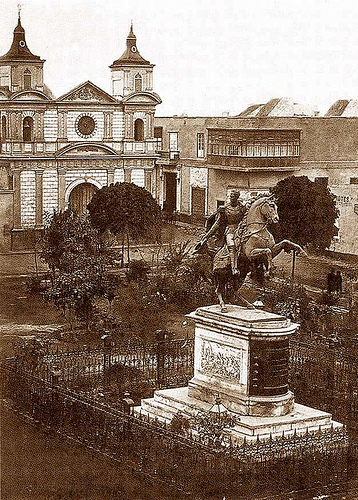
The Plaza Bolivar with Our Lady of Charity church in the 1800s

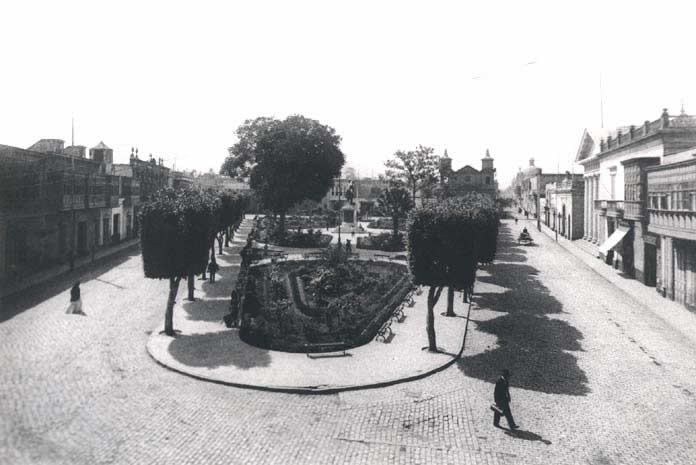
The Plaza Bolivar in the 1800s

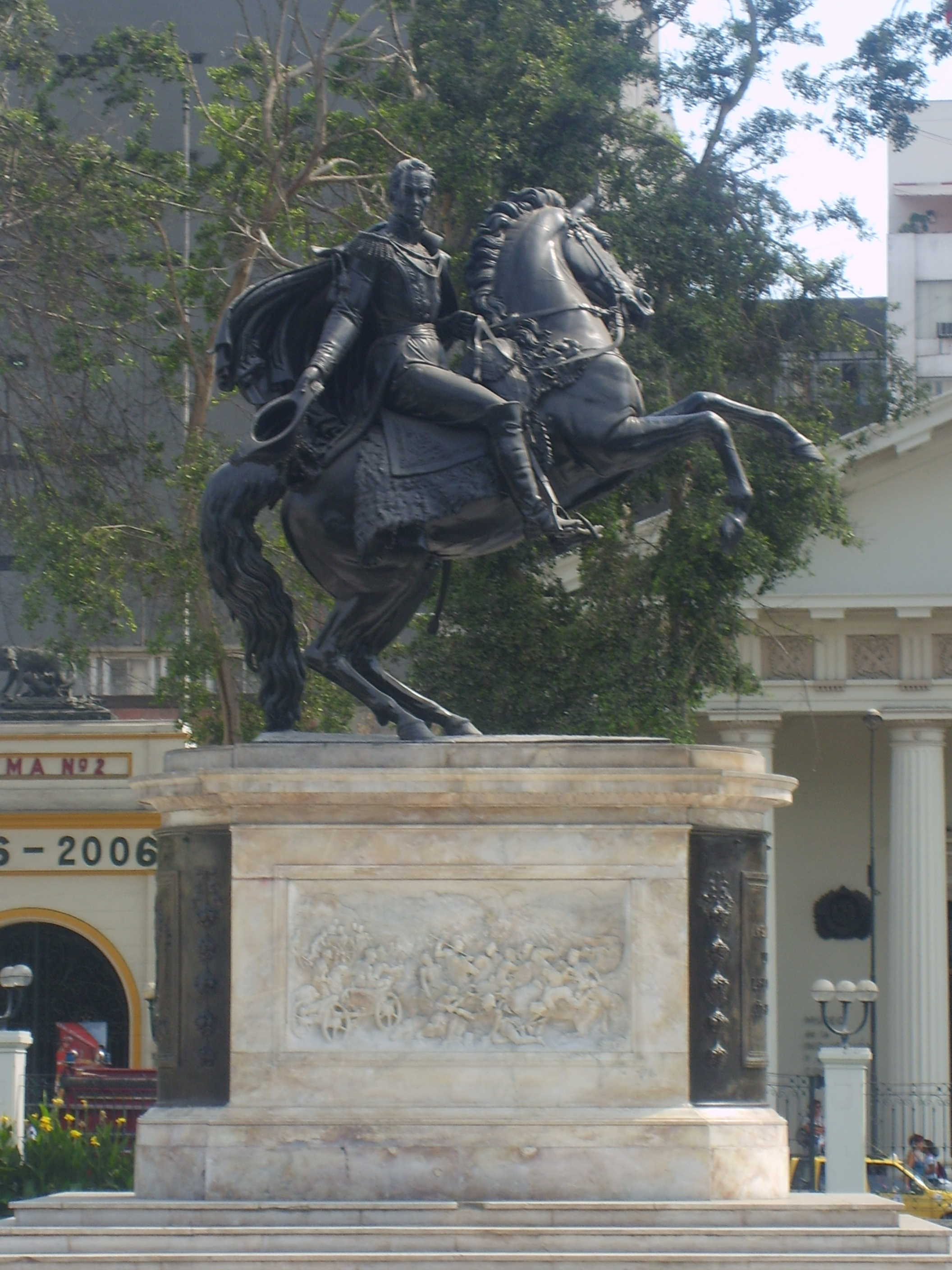
Statue to Simon Bolivar

== See also ==
- Plaza Mayor, Lima
- Plaza Italia, Lima
- Plazoleta de la Merced
