= Plazoleta de la Merced =

Cultural heritage site in Peru

Coordinates: 12°02′53″S 77°01′58″W

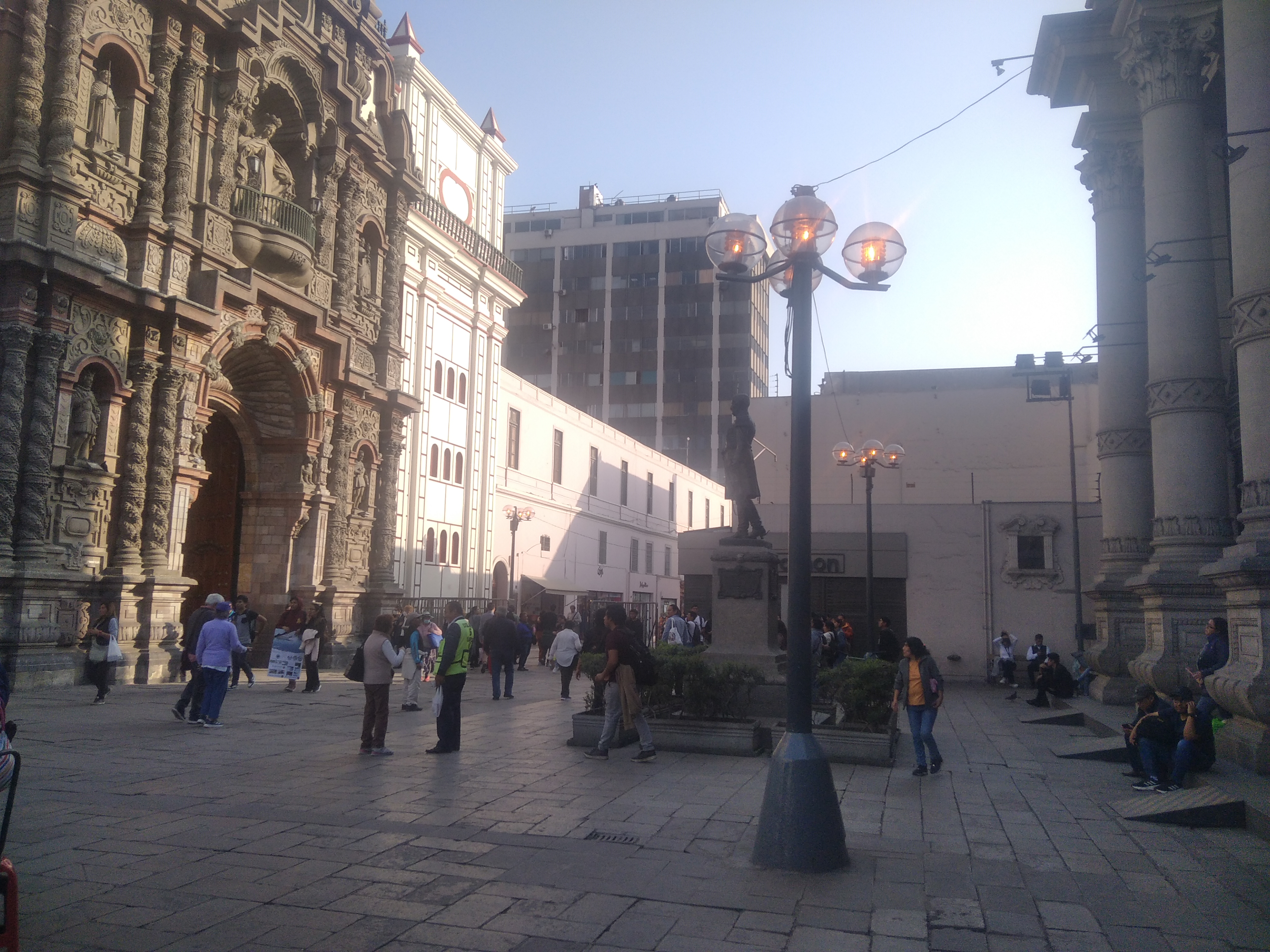

- Location within Lima
- Location: Lima, Peru

UNESCO World Heritage Site
- Type: Non-movable
- Criteria: Monument
- Designated: 1991
- Part of: Historic Centre of Lima
- Reference no.: 500

The Plazoleta de la Merced, also known as the Plazuela de la Merced, is a public square located in front of the Basilica and Convent of Nuestra Señora de la Merced, at the fifth block of the Jirón de la Unión and its intersection with the Jirón Huancavelica, in the historic centre of Lima, Peru.

== History ==
Located in front of the Basilica de la Merced, the square was the scene of two important political moments in the republican history of Peru. In 1821, it was the location of one of José de San Martín's proclamations of the independence of Peru. Previously, he had done it in the city of Huaura and in the Plaza Mayor.

Subsequently, on June 1, 1956, the then candidate for the presidency of the republic, Fernando Belaúnde Terry, held a march in protest against the action of the National Jury of Elections, which did not agree to register his candidacy just sixteen days before the elections. This protest march was repressed with water jets thrown at the candidate, but it managed to get the state body to register his candidacy. Belaúnde lost that year's election to Manuel Prado Ugarteche.

== Monument ==
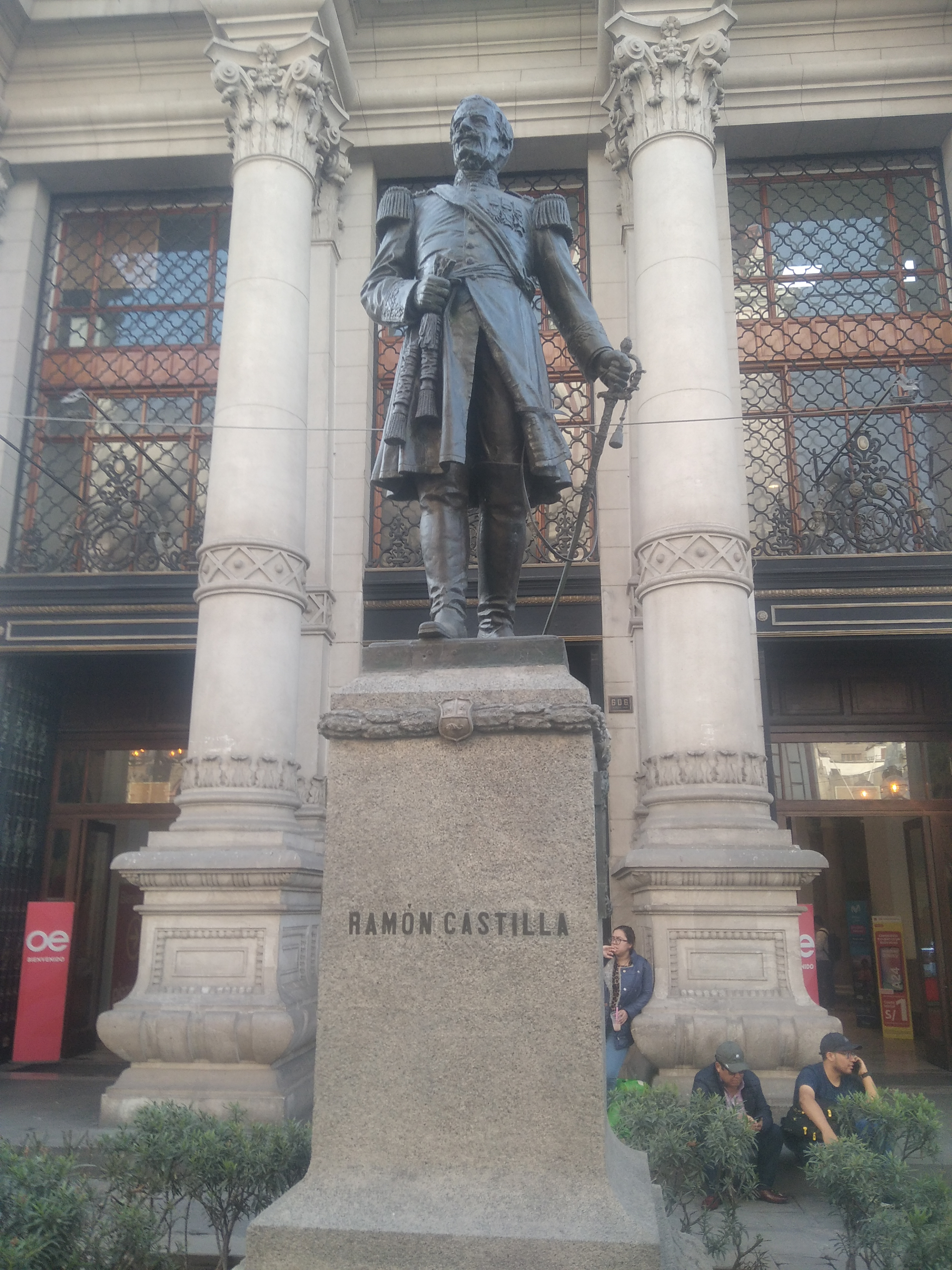
The monument in 2023.

The square is the site of a bronze monument made by David Lozano (Callao; January 7, 1865 — Lima; January 16, 1936) of former president Ramón Castilla, inaugurated on June 6, 1915, by then president Óscar R. Benavides, Marshal Andrés Avelino Cáceres, and then mayor of Lima, Federico Elguera.

Originally planned to be located in the balneario of Chorrillos, it has been in its current location since 1915. In 2018, it was declared part of the Cultural heritage of Peru alongside the other statues located within the historic centre of Lima.

== See also ==
- Basilica and Convent of Nuestra Señora de la Merced
- Plaza Mayor, Lima
- Plaza Italia, Lima
- Plaza Bolívar, Lima
