= Santa Beatriz =

Neighbourhood of Lima, Peru

- Neighbourhood
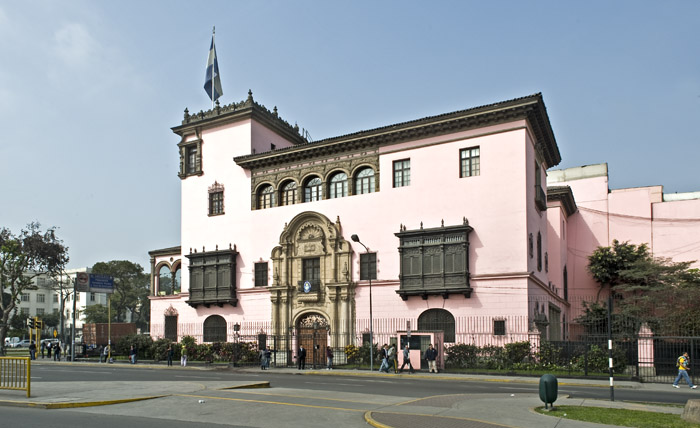
- Traditional embassy of Argentina
- Interactive map of Santa Beatriz
- Country: Peru
- Department: Lima
- Province: Lima
- District: Lima
- Established: December 26, 1921
- Founder: Augusto B. Leguía

Population (2017)
  - Total: 15,122
- Time zone: UTC-5 (PET)

Santa Beatriz (Spanish: [ˈsanta be.aˈtɾiθ]; lit. 'Saint Beatrice') is a neighbourhood of Lima District. It serves as the district's southernmost area, bordered to the east by Paseo de la República Avenue, to the south by Lince, and to the west by Jesús María. Its creation dates back to 1921, under the 11-year government of Augusto B. Leguía.

The neighbourhood was originally conceived as a modern residential area that would accompany the newly constructed Leguía Avenue. It was the first community of its kind outside of the city's former old quarter, once surrounded by the large defensive walls demolished by José Balta's government. During the early 20th century, its residents included important figures of Peruvian literature.

Santa Beatriz features traditional architectural styles since its establishment, including Spanish Revival and Art Deco, among others. Due to their history and significance, several buildings and structures in the area are part of the Cultural heritage of Peru. Like many other parts of the city, however, many of these buildings have since been demolished and replaced. Due to the former estate's vast size, two other districts (Jesús María and Lince) also have neighbourhoods of the same name.

== Etymology ==
The neighbourhood is named after Beatriz Bravo de Lagunas, one of the owners of the hacienda located south of Matamandinga orchard. The hacienda was named after Santa Beatriz due to a Viceregal custom where the Christian name would be associated with a saint's feast day as per the Christian calendar. The estate would eventually become the neighbourhood of the same name.

== History ==
Located in the Huatica valley, when the Spanish conquest took place, Francisco Pizarro awarded this estate to Diego de Agüero, who named it the Hacienda Santa Beatriz. Upon the death of his son, Diego de Agüero y Garay, the agricultural property was acquired by the novitiate of the Society of Jesus, in 1629. After the expulsion of the Jesuits, in 1771 the government sold the property to Manuel de la Torre y Quiroz, who, together with his wife Águeda Josefa de Tagle, founded an estate on the hacienda. According to the law of separation of estates, the estate passed to Josefa de Tagle, IV Marchioness of Torre Tagle, from whom the State expropriated the estate in 1870 for the construction of an agronomy school.

=== 20th century ===
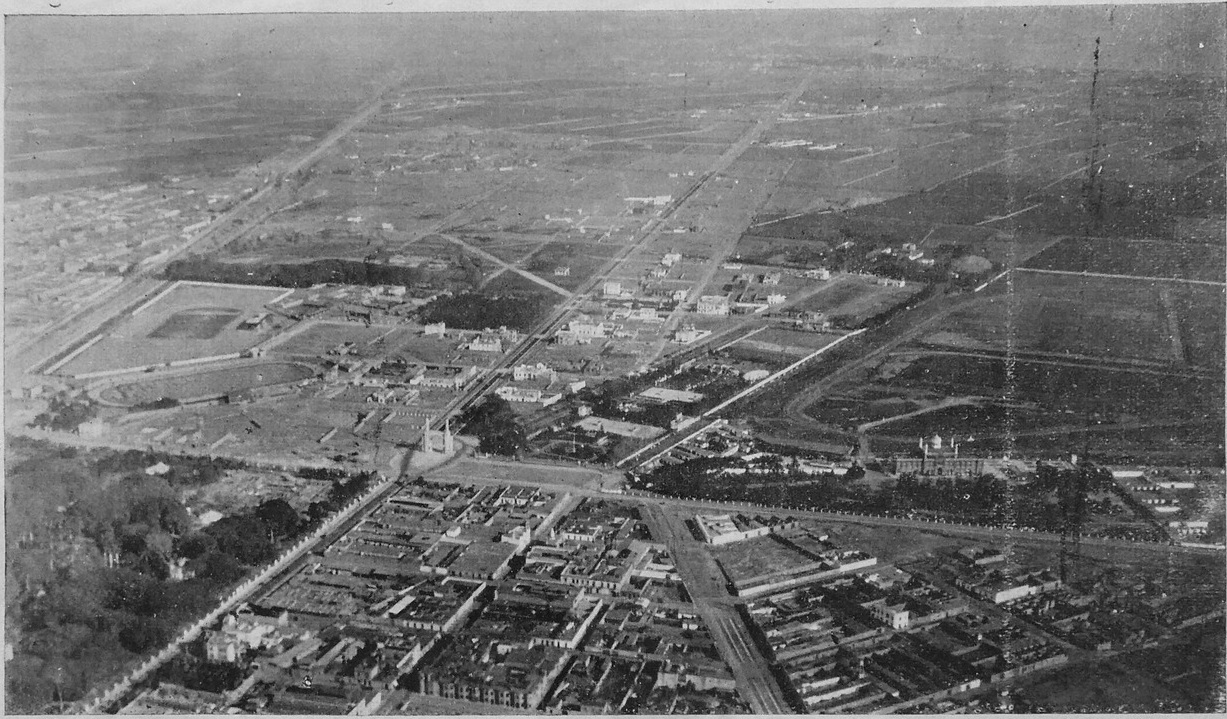
Santa Beatriz in 1924.

Eminently residential in nature, it was the first urbanization created outside the boundaries of the old historic centre of Lima, and the first of its kind in the country. It was founded during the government of President Augusto B. Leguía through laws No. 4449 (December 26, 1921), 4655 (April 23, 1923), 4667 (May 12), and two Supreme Resolutions (September 26, 1924 and October 23, 1925), which authorised the sale of land, concessions and exchanges. Located in the district was the Hipódromo de Santa Beatriz (today the Campo de Marte), which was the oldest in Peru and operated until the mid-1930s when it was replaced by the Hipódromo de San Felipe. At this racecourse, members of the British colony also met to practice golf prior to the founding of the Lima Golf Club and the first landing strip in Peru also functioned, prior to the construction of the Limatambo International Airport.

The urbanization section was planned according to North American characteristics (very consistent with Leguía's time), with main avenues (Arenales, Arequipa and Petit Thouars), two-storey mansions, garages for cars and large gardens similar to mansions. Its urbanization in the early 1930s broke all the residential patterns of Lima, where wealthy families began to leave the historic centre to move beyond the limits of Paseo Colón and also for direct access to the Miraflores spas.

The architecture of the houses surrounding Arequipa and Arenales avenues had a European style and in the area of Petit Thouars avenue adjacent to the Lince neighbourhoods (the former Lobatón hacienda) they had an Art Deco style.

=== 21st century ===
Starting on January 20, 2024, the Casa Boza, one of the neighbourhood's oldest houses that was built in 1925, was demolished to make way for a university building after its inclusion in the national heritage registry was controversially rejected by the Ministry of Culture.

== Geography ==
As part of Lima District, Santa Beatriz is part of the country's Chala region. It is also part of Lima's Cono Centro, an unofficial subregion of the city.

=== Boundaries ===
The neighbourhood is bordered to the north by Avenida 28 de Julio, to the east by Paseo de la República Avenue, to the south by Lince, and to the west by Jesús María.

=== Climate ===
Climate data for Lima
| Month | Jan | Feb | Mar | Apr | May | Jun | Jul | Aug | Sep | Oct | Nov | Dec | Year |
|---|---|---|---|---|---|---|---|---|---|---|---|---|---|
| Record high °F | 79 | 79 | 79 | 75 | 72 | 68 | 66 | 64 | 66 | 68 | 72 | 75 | 72 |
| Record high °C | 26 | 26 | 26 | 24 | 22 | 20 | 19 | 18 | 19 | 20 | 22 | 24 | 22 |
| Average precipitation days | 1 | 1 | 0 | 0 | 1 | 2 | 3 | 3 | 3 | 2 | 2 | 0 | 16 |
| Average rainy days | 4 | 2 | 3 | 2 | 5 | 11 | 12 | 15 | 13 | 7 | 5 | 3 | 82 |
| Average relative humidity (%) | 85 | 80 | 80 | 85 | 85 | 85 | 85 | 85 | 85 | 85 | 85 | 85 | 84.2 |
| Mean monthly sunshine hours | 179.1 | 169 | 139.2 | 184 | 116.4 | 50.6 | 28.6 | 32.3 | 37.3 | 65.3 | 89 | 139.2 | 1,284 |
Source: Weatherbase (Temperature, precipitation and humidity). and Universidad Complutense de Madrid (Sunlight)

== Demographics ==
As of 2017, the neighbourhood's population was numbered at 15,122 residents.

=== Education ===
The neighbourhood is home to several educational institutions, such as Norbert Wiener University, Inca Garcilaso de la Vega University and the Technological University of Peru, the National School of Statistics and Informatics (ENEI), the private schools of San Andrés (formerly the Anglo–Peruvian School), Dante Alighieri (formerly Antonio Raimondi), Trilce, Saco Oliveros, and Palmer, among others.

=== Notable people ===
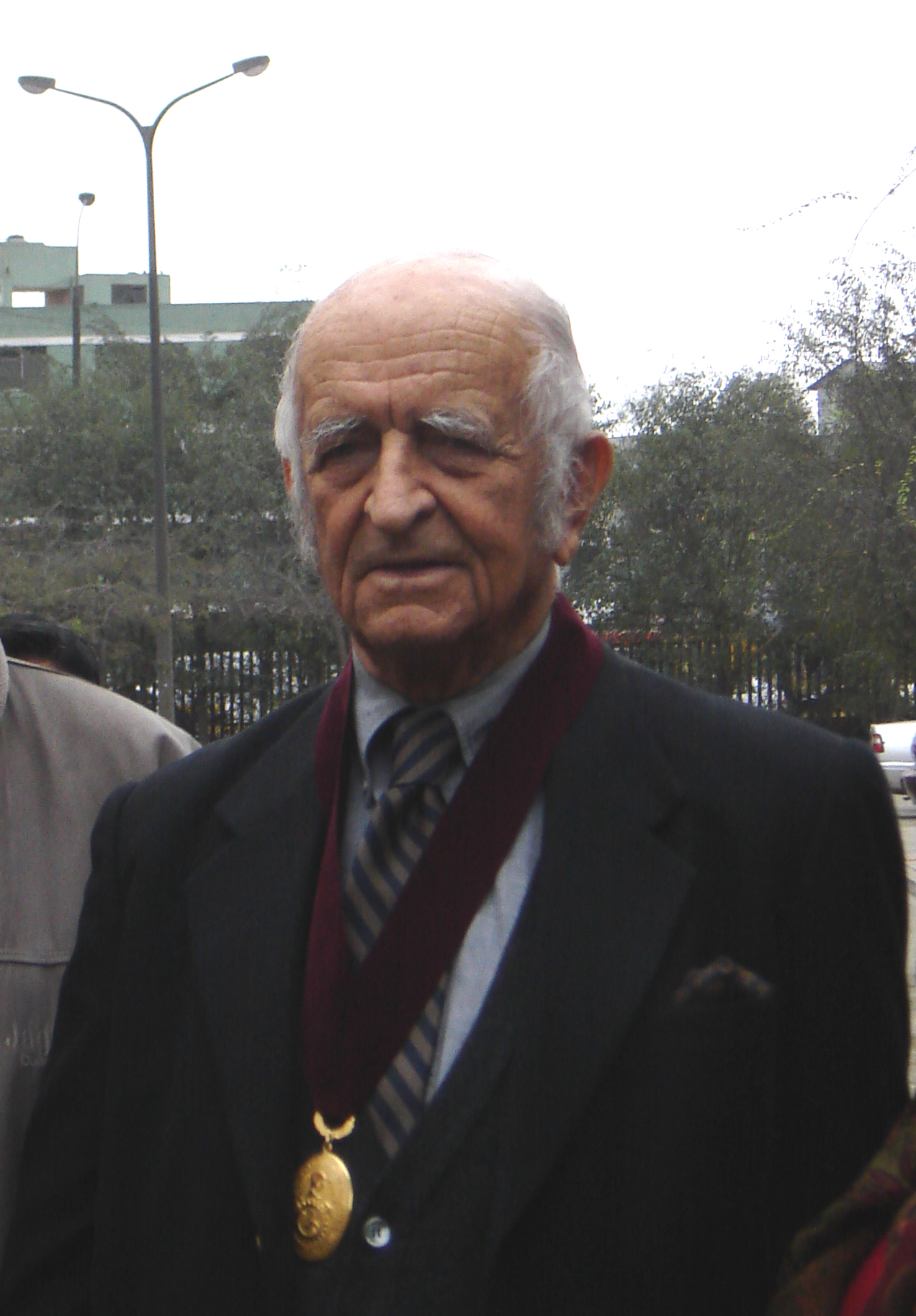
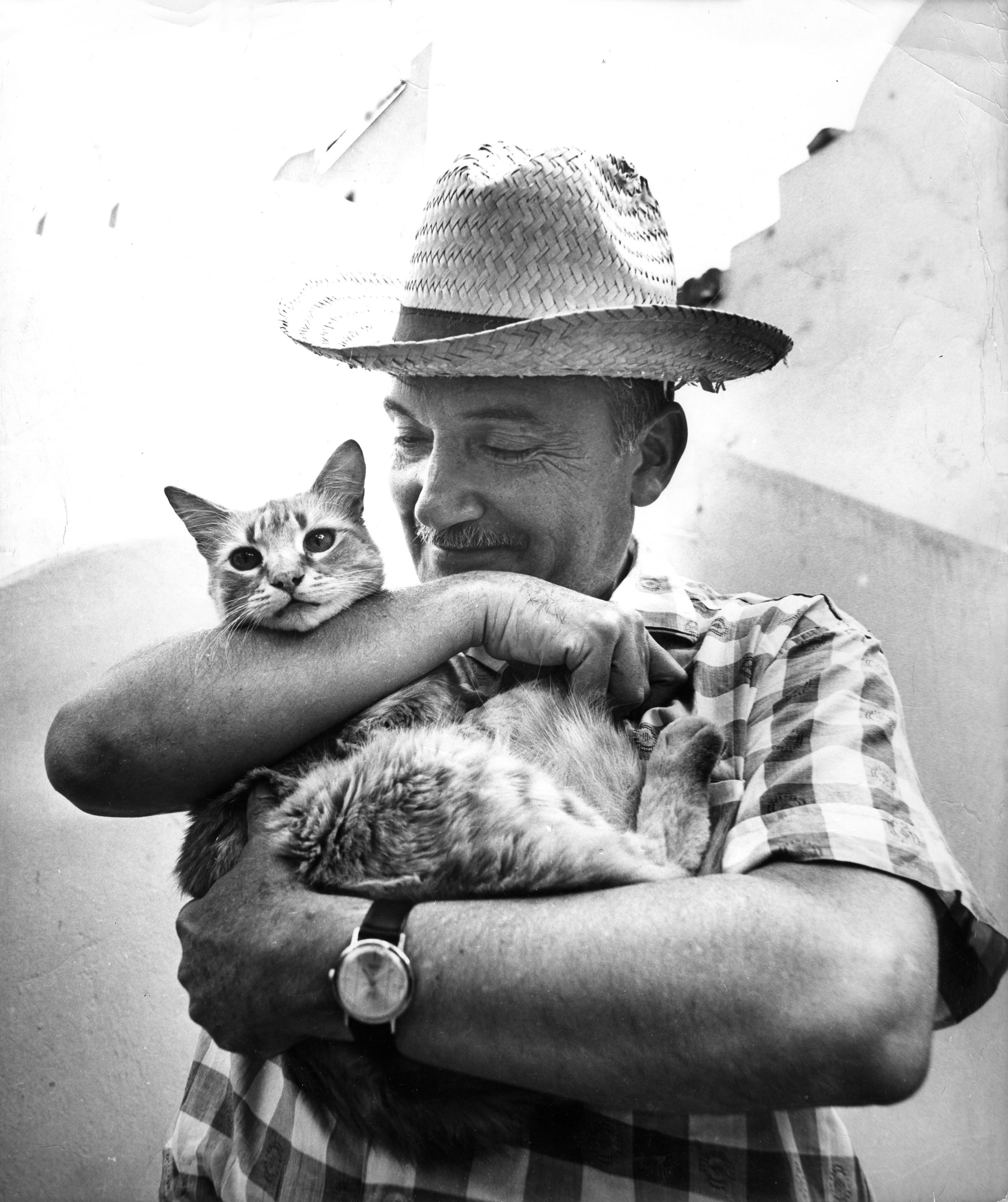
Santa Beatriz was home to artists such as Fernando de Szyszlo (left) and José María Arguedas (right), as well as several members of Peru's "Generation of '50".
- Carlos Álvarez, comedian, television presenter and screenwriter
- Alberto Andrade, lawyer and politician
- José María Arguedas, novelist, poet and anthropologist
- Washington Delgado, poet
- Carlos Germán Belli, poet
- Jorge Eduardo Eielson, artist and writer
- Chabuca Granda, singer and songwriter
- Enrique Iturriaga, composer and educator
- Luis Millones Santagadea, historian, anthropologist and educator
- Enrique Pinilla, composer, conductor, critic and educator
- Julio Ramón Ribeyro, writer
- Sebastián Salazar Bondy, playwright, essayist, poet, and journalist
- Javier Sologuren, writer and poet
- Fernando de Szyszlo, painter, sculptor, printmaker and teacher
- Blanca Varela, poet
- Emilio Adolfo Westphalen, poet and essayist

== Culture ==
=== Landmarks ===
Santa Beatriz concentrates Arequipa, Petit Thouars, and Arenales, three of the main arteries of the city, and also houses various public buildings and cultural centres.

Landmarks of Santa Beatriz
| Name | Location | Notes | Photo |
| Cristo Rey | Sargento Enrique Villar 605 | The parish church was built in the Gothic Revival style. Located across the street was a synagogue, eventually demolished and its congregation moved to another district. | |
| Embassy of Argentina | Arequipa 107 | The embassy's traditional chancery is located on a plot of land donated to the Argentine government. It served as the embassy, consulate and ambassadorial residence until 2012. Its Consulate-General is located nearby, next to the former Embassy of Taiwan. | |
| Embassy of Venezuela | Arequipa 298 | Originally built as the private residence of politician Foción Mariátegui, it was eventually acquired by the Venezuelan government. | |
| Embassy Residence of the United States | Benjamín Roca García s/n | The Spanish Revival building functions as the official residence for the U.S. ambassador to Peru. | |
| Founders of Independence Society | Arequipa 410 | The building, originally planned as a museum and residence for Andrés Avelino Cáceres, serves as the headquarters of the institution of the same name. | |
| Hernán Velarde Park | | The park was originally built as part of a sports complex to accompany the stadium, first as a velodrome, and later as a dog racing track. It was ultimately turned into a residential park. | |
| Istituto Italiano di Cultura | Arequipa 1055 | The Spanish Revival building was built on a plot donated in 1929. It functioned as the Colegio Raimondi until 1997, and has since functioned as a branch of the Italian embassy. | |
| Joint Command of the Armed Forces | Manuel Corpancho 289 | The 20th-century building currently hosts the government institution. | |
| Luigi Pirandello Theatre | Alejandro Tirado 274 | Located next to the Italian Institute, it is named after Luigi Pirandello. It was inaugurated in 1980. | |
| Military Police Court | República de Chile 321 | The building aims to maintain order, security and discipline within the country's armed forces. | |
| National Stadium of Peru | José Díaz s/n | The multi-purpose stadium is the city's most important building of its type, and serves as the headquarters for the Peruvian Sports Institute. | |
| Parque Cervantes | | The park's best known feature is a monument dedicated to French admiral Abel-Nicolas Bergasse du Petit-Thouars, who played a role in the War of the Pacific. | |
| Parque de la Reserva | | The park was originally part of the Parque de la Exposición, and was modified in the 20th century, incorporating a public square dedicated to Antonio José de Sucre into its premises. It is best known for its water show, the Magic Water Tour. | |
| Parque Washington | | The park is best known for its statue of George Washington. Next to it is The Three Graces, a water fountain donated in 1921. | |
| Radio Nacional del Perú | Petit Thouars 447 | The building hosts the state-owned institution of the same name, and was built to look like a transmitter in the Art Deco style. | |
| Rospigliosi Castle | Manuel del Pino 448 | Built in 1929 by Carlos Rospigliosi Vigil as a residence for himself and his family. Since 1949, it has been the headquarters of the Air Warfare Academy, as property of the Peruvian State. | |
| Saint Thérèse of the Child Jesus | José Díaz 453 | The church was built from 1927 to 1938, and sponsored by President Leguía and Teresa Álvarez-Calderón, widow of Manuel Candamo. | |
| Spanish Cultural Centre | Natalio Sánchez 181 | Originally built as the private residence of lawyer Emilio Pro y Mariátegui, the centre currently functions as the cultural branch of the Spanish embassy. | |

In addition to the aforementioned landmarks, it also houses television stations belonging to América Televisión, Panamericana Televisión and TV Perú, as well as several educational institutions.

== Transport ==
The district's main avenue is serviced by the Corredor Azul, a bus transit system operated by the Integrated Transport System.

== See also ==
- History of Peru (1919–1930)
- Barrios Altos
