= Avenida Petit Thouars =

Avenue in Lima, Peru

Petit Thouars Avenue
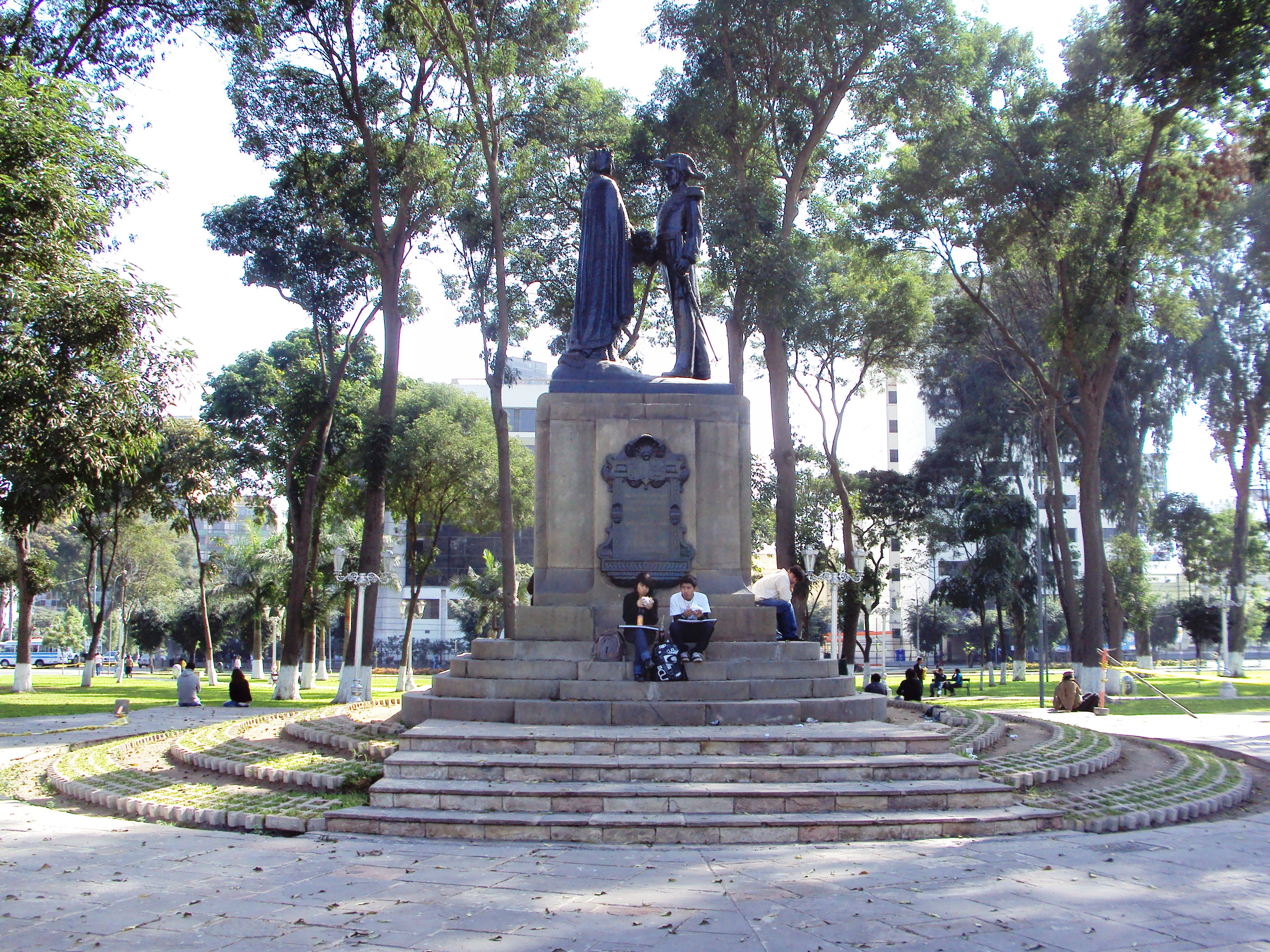
- Monument in the avenue
- Part of: Santa Beatriz
- Namesake: Vice-Admiral Petit-Thouars
- From: Ricardo Palma Avenue
- Major junctions: Alejandro Tirado Avenue, Juan Pardo de Zela Avenue, Javier Prado Avenue, Andrés Aramburú Avenue, Angamos Avenue
- To: Avenida 28 de Julio

Petit Thouars Avenue (Spanish: Avenida Petit Thouars) is a major avenue in Lima, Peru. Starting in its intersection with Ricardo Palma Avenue, it crosses vertically through Miraflores, and continues through the districts of Lince, San Isidro and Lima, through its southern neighbourhood of Santa Beatriz, until it reaches 28 de Julio Avenue. It runs parallel to nearby Arequipa and Arenales avenues.

== History ==
The avenue was inaugurated under the government of Augusto B. Leguía, during the early 20th century. It is named after French Vice-Admiral Abel-Nicolas Bergasse du Petit-Thouars, who played an important role in the War of the Pacific, guaranteeing the integrity of Lima during its occupation by the Chilean Army. A monument to Petit-Thouars, also inaugurated by Leguía, is located in the Miguel de Cervantes park. The monument features two statues shaking hands: one of Petit-Thouars, and a female figure representing the city. Originally located next to the city's canidrome (today Hernán Velarde park), it was later moved to its current location, in front of the National Radio's headquarters.

In 1925, the U.S. government purchased a 11,600 m^{2} (125,000 sq ft) property next to the avenue to house its embassy. Construction began in late 1942, and concluded in 1945. It currently serves as the country's ambassadorial residence.

== Route ==
The avenue intersects with Angamos Avenue in Miraflores District.

== See also ==
- Santa Beatriz
