= Rospigliosi Castle =

Landmark and museum in Lima, Peru

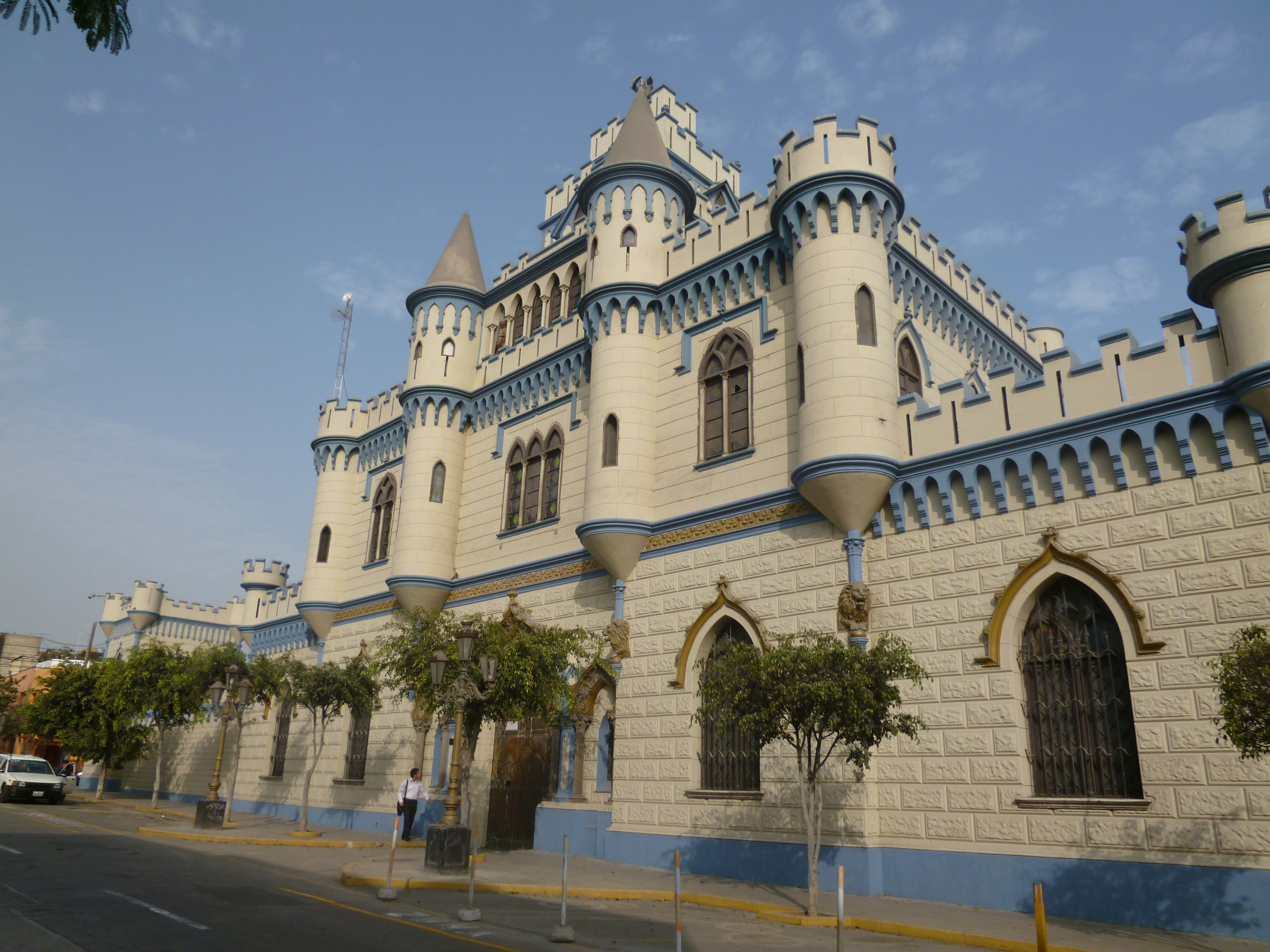
- Interactive map of the Rospigliosi Castle area

General information
- Architectural style: Gothic
- Location: Jr. Manuel del Pino 488, Santa Beatriz, Lima
- Coordinates: 12°04′42″S 77°01′59″W
- Year built: 1929
- Inaugurated: December 15, 1959 (museum)

Rospigliosi Castle (Spanish: Castillo Rospigliosi) is a castle and museum in the neighbourhood of Santa Beatriz in Lima District, Lima, Peru. Since 1959, part of the castle is occupied by the Aeronautical Museum of Peru (Spanish: Museo Aeronáutico del Perú), previously housed at Las Palmas Air Base.

== History ==
The castle was built in 1929, under the government of Augusto B. Leguía, its construction promoted by Dr. Carlos Rospigliosi Vigil (a descendant of the Italian Rospigliosi family). An urban legend claims that the castle was built by Rospigliosi in order to host King Alfonso XIII during his visit to Peru, with him even requesting the local authorities that he be allowed to build a moat surrounding it to justify the drawbridge that was initially part of the castle's design, which was denied. The legend concludes that as the castle's construction was coming to an end, the political revolution that caused the establishment of a republic in Spain put an end to the King's planned visit, and the doctor was forced to use the castle as his residence. Peruvian historian Juan Luis Orrego Penagos claims that, while Rospigliosi was very much eager with his project, his original intent had always been to use it as a family residence for his wife, son and himself.

The Academy of Air Warfare of the Peruvian Air Force subsequently occupied the castle's premises in 1949, which it has continued to operate in since, and the castle served as a filming location for movies of the era, such as Enzo Longhi's La Perricholi (1928), first screened at the Cine Colón.

In 1959, the Aeronautical Museum of Peru was inaugurated in the castle's premises, whose collection includes items owned by aviators such as Jorge Chávez, Pedro Paulet and José Abelardo Quiñones. Another room features an exhibition dedicated to the Cenepa War.

== See also ==
- Friendship Park (Lima), visited by King Juan Carlos I and Queen Sofía of Spain in 2001
