= Founders of Independence Society =

Organisation in Peru

- Sociedad Fundadores de la Independencia
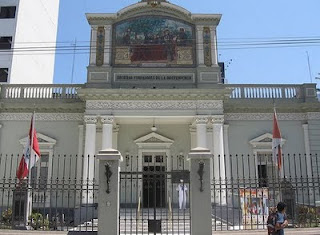
- Headquarters in Lima

Agency overview
- Formed: September 28, 1857; 167 years ago
- Type: Voluntary association
- Jurisdiction: Peru
- Headquarters: Av. Arequipa 410, Lima
- President responsible: Carlos Alfonso Tafur Ganoza
- Website: www.gob.pe/bsfi

The Founders of Independence Society (Spanish: Sociedad Fundadores de la Independencia), officially the Meritorious Society "Founders of Independence, Victors on May 2, 1866 and Qualified Defenders of the Homeland" (Spanish: Benemérita Sociedad Fundadores de la Independencia, Vencedores el 2 de mayo de 1866 y Defensores Calificados de la Patria), is a Peruvian civic-patriotic association headquartered in Lima, the first of its kind in the country.

The society currently brings together its members in activities that worship the memory of the heroes and founding fathers of Peru's independence. The society has the Virgin of the Immaculate Conception as its Protector and Saint Rose of Lima as its Patroness. The company is an entity attached to the Ministry of Defence.

== History ==
Once the operations aimed at consolidating the Independence of Peru were concluded, many of the Peruvians who participated in those days were left in the greatest distress, since the fiscal coffers did not have enough money to solve their needs.

A group of ex-combatants formed, among others, by Colonels Casimiro Negrón de la Fuente, José Domingo Espinar, Juan Basilio Cortegana and Canon Juan Sánchez achieved that on September 28, 1857, 140 heroes of independence signed in the Chapter House of the Convent of San Francisco the installation document in which the then Humane Society of the Founders of Independence (Spanish: Sociedad Humanitaria de los Fundadores de la Independencia) is established. The then President of the Republic, Ramon Castilla, was appointed as its president and General Juan Francisco de Vidal as its Active President.

After the Peruvian victory at the Battle of Callao, President Mariano Ignacio Prado ordered that the name be extended in order to facilitate the entry of the combattants into the association.

Once the War of the Pacific was over, and Peruvian territory was no longer occupied, new institutions emerged with similar purposes. With the objective of unifying these institutions, by decree of November 2, 1937, all of them were incorporated into the society, adopting the name it has today.

On September 5, 1917, the Congress of Peru, chaired by Juan Pardo y Barreda, promulgated Law No. 2432, recognising the society as an official institution; with the right to be represented in civic ceremonies and to occupy, within protocol precedence, a place after the General Commanders of the Armed Institutes.

After the negotiations with President Augusto B. Leguía, the transfer to the society of the building constructed for the residence of Andrés Avelino Cáceres in 1924 was obtained. The transfer of the property was completed by the month of December and was inaugurated on the occasion of the first centennial of the battle of Ayacucho.

== Headquarters ==
The society currently has a headquarters located on Av. Arequipa, in the Santa Beatriz neighbourhood. The building was originally built to be the residence of Andrés Avelino Cáceres, as well as a museum—the Museo de la Breña—due to his death in 1923, however, the building was transferred to the society.

The institutional headquarters is the main location of the society in which solemn sessions are held annually to honour the memory of various national heroes and celebrate commemorative dates. For this purpose, the premises have a solemn session hall adorned with various paintings, busts and statues of the heroes of the history of Peru. President Augusto B. Leguía commissioned Waring & Gillow Ltd. of London to make the furniture, curtains, carpets and decorations for the Session Hall and the President's room at the company's headquarters.

The institutional headquarters of the society was declared Cultural heritage of Peru on February 9, 1999.

== List of presidents ==
The following is a list of associates who have served as active presidents of the institution:

President	Period
Francisco de Vidal y Laos	1857-1861
Francisco Quirós y Ampudia	1861-1863
José Hermenegildo Allende y Sánchez	1863
José Domingo Espinar y Aranda	1863-1864
José Hermenegildo Allende y Sánchez	1864-1866
Estanislao Correa y Garay	1866-1868
Francisco Alvarado Ortiz	1868-1869
Tomás Cipriano de Mosquera y Arboleda	1869-1870
José Hermenegildo Allende y Sánchez	1870-1871
Francisco Carassa y Jaramillo	1871-1873
José Gervasio Álvarez y Ordériz	1873-1878
Bonifacio Franco Cueto	1878-1879
Manuel Villar y Olivera	1885-1887
Antonio Rodríguez Ramírez	1887-1888
Lizardo Montero Flores	1888-1891
Juan Buendía y Noriega	1891-1895
Manuel Beingolea y Oyague	1895-1896
Isaac Recavarren Gómez	1896-1898
Miguel Coloma Saavedra	1898-1901
Federico Ríos	1901-1902
Juan Norberto Eléspuru y Laso de la Vega	1902-1914
Toribio Raygada y Oyarzábal	1914-1916
Francisco Román Galindo	1916-1918
Juan Nepomuceno Vargas Quintanilla	1918

President	Period
Emilio Benavides Sánchez-Carrión	1918-1920
Enrique C. Basadre Stevenson	1920-1922
Foción Mariátegui y Palacio	1922-1929
Ricardo Sevilla	1929-1930
José Luis Salmón Fossati	1930-1931
Juan Manuel Zuloaga y Navarrete	1931-1936
José Ernesto de Mora y Romero	1936-1938
José Luis Salmón Fossati	1938-1947
Manuel Elías Bonnemaison Torres	1947-1954
Aurelio García Godos y Hurtado de Mendoza	1954-1956
Ismael Otárola Cabrera	1956-1958
Armando Zamudio y Colmenares	1958-1959
Juan Francisco Torres Matos	1959-1960
Néstor Gambetta Bonatti	1960-1968
Julio José Elías Murguía	1968-1972
Manuel Remond Cárdenas	1972-1973
Carlos Miñano Mendocilla	1974-1980
Enrique Ciriani Santa Rosa	1981-1982
Jorge Bellina Eggerstedt	1983-1986
César Podestá Jiménez	1987-1990
Jorge Carlín Arce	1991-1994
Salvador Barrios Eléspuru	1995-2000
Fernando Grau Umlauff	2001-2004
Carlos Alfonso Tafur Ganoza	2005–present

== See also ==
- Armed Forces of Peru
