= Arenales Avenue =

Avenue in Lima, Peru

Avenida Arenales
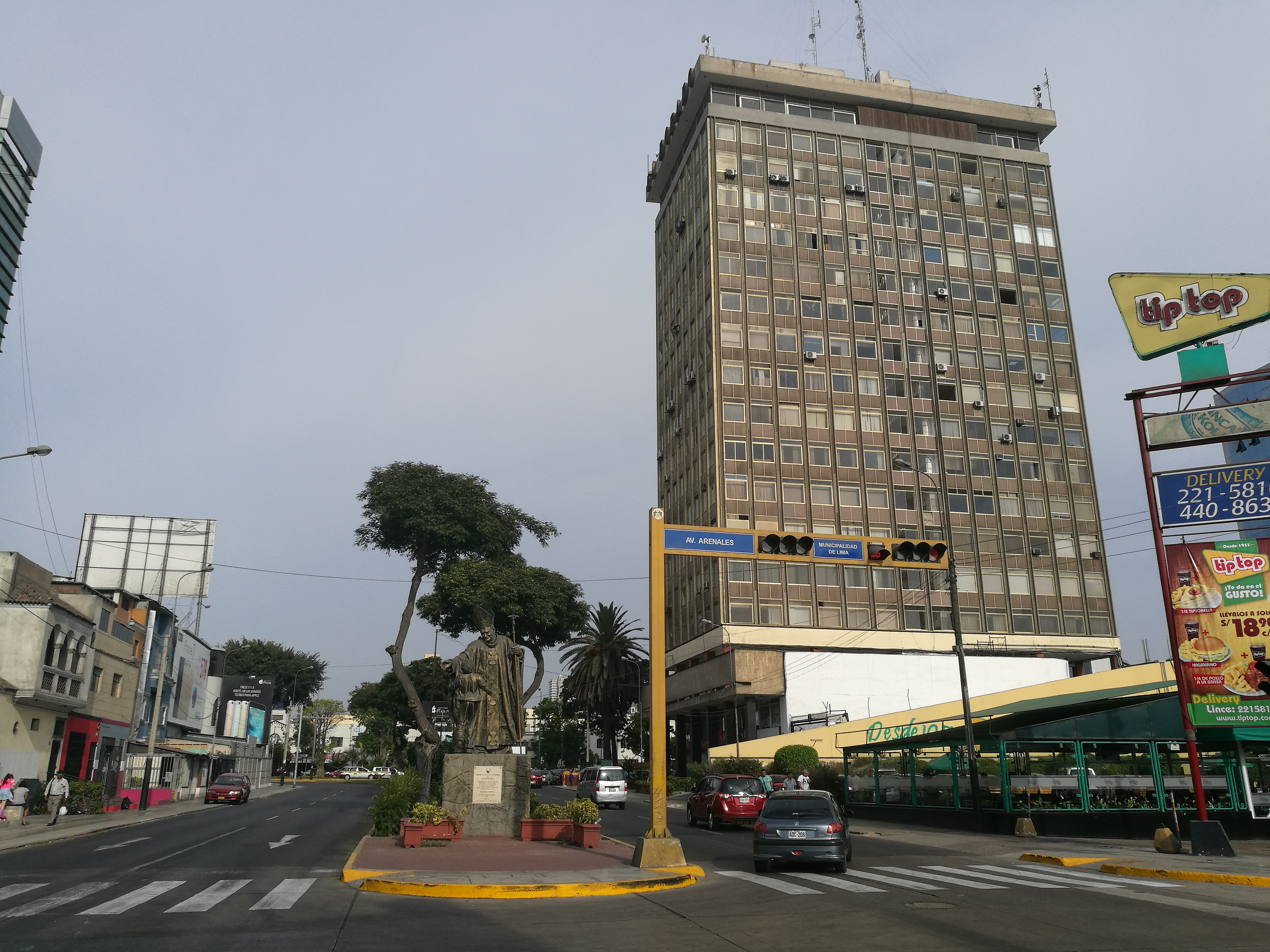
- Statue of Pope John Paul II in Lince
- Namesake: Juan Antonio Álvarez de Arenales
- From: Republic of Chile Avenue
- Major junctions: Cuba Avenue, Juan Pardo de Zela Avenue, César Vallejo Avenue
- To: Javier Prado Avenue

General Juan Antonio Álvarez de Arenales Avenue (Spanish: Avenida General Juan Antonio Álvarez de Arenales), known simply as Arenales Avenue (Spanish: Avenida Arenales), is a major avenue in Lima, Peru. It starts at its intersection with Republic of Chile Avenue and continues to the south, until it reaches Javier Prado Avenue, joining the districts of Lima (where its first twelve blocks serve as the western limit of its southernmost neighbourhood), Lince and San Isidro.

== Overview ==
In February 1971, the Torre Trecca, a building originally meant to be an apartment building for EsSalud workers, began construction. The 23-storey building's progress was halted in June 1990, and it was only acquired by the healthcare company in 2010 with the intent of transforming it into a medical centre. It was transferred to the Trecca consortium two years later, acquiring its current name. Work on the building was meant to continue to coincide with the Bicentennial of the Independence of Peru, which did not happen either.

The avenue's best known landmark is Arenales Shopping Centre, located at the avenue's 17th block. The 5,500 m^{2} (later 21,100 m^{2}) building began construction in 1978. In November of the next year, it inaugurated its first floor and basement. The second floor was finished in September 1981, and its third floor in December 1983. It has 120 stores, two cinemas, and a capacity for 200 vehicles. Its popularity stems from the fact that, since the 1990s, it's the focal point of followers of the city's otaku subculture.

A statue of Pope John Paul II is located at the avenue's intersection with César Vallejo Avenue. It was blessed by Juan Luis Cipriani Thorne, then Archbishop of Lima, in 2013.

== See also ==
- Avenida Arequipa, which runs parallel to the avenue
