= Military Police Court =

Law organisation in Peru

- Fuero Militar Policial
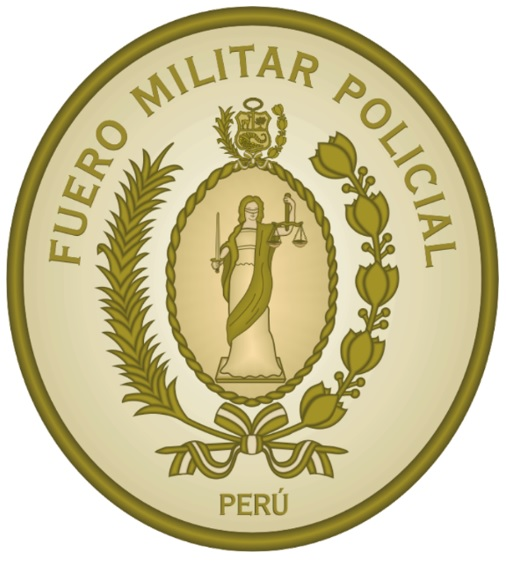

Agency overview
- Formed: 1898
- Headquarters: Santa Beatriz, Lima
- President responsible: Major General (r) Arturo Antonio Giles Ferrer
- Website: www.gob.pe/fmp

The Military Police Court (Spanish: Fuero Militar Policial; FMP) is a Peruvian military law organisation made up of jurisdictional and prosecutorial bodies at an equivalent level. Its penal code aims to contribute to the maintenance of order, security and discipline of both the Armed Forces and the National Police of Peru.

It is the autonomous, independent and impartial jurisdictional body in the military-police criminal field, it is an exceptional and independent jurisdiction of the Judicial Branch, as established in article 139 of the Constitution of Peru. It is competent to judge military and police officers on duty who commit crimes in their capacity.

== History ==
After the Peruvian War of Independence, with respect to military justice, the Royal Spanish Ordinances of Charles III continued to govern in Peru from 1768 to 1898, the date of the granting of the first Code of Military Justice in 1898, in which The organization and jurisdiction of military jurisdiction, the classification of crimes, the regulation of trial procedures and the execution of sentences imposed by Military Courts were established.

The War and Navy Council was created with the enactment of the first Code of Military Justice, in force from December 20, 1898, to October 31, 1906. When Law No. 273 was promulgated, its name changed to the Council of War and Navy. General Officers and was installed on December 7, 1906, until July 25, 1963, in which by Decree Law No. 14612, Organic Law of Military Justice, created the Supreme Council of Military Justice until January 11, 2008, which With Law No. 29182, it creates the Military Police Jurisdiction in force on the date. On December 20, 2020, its 122nd anniversary was commemorated.

== See also ==
- Military justice
- Supreme Court of Peru
