= Parque de la Reserva =

Park in downtown Lima, Peru

Park of the Reserve
- Parque de la Reserva; Circuito Mágico del Agua
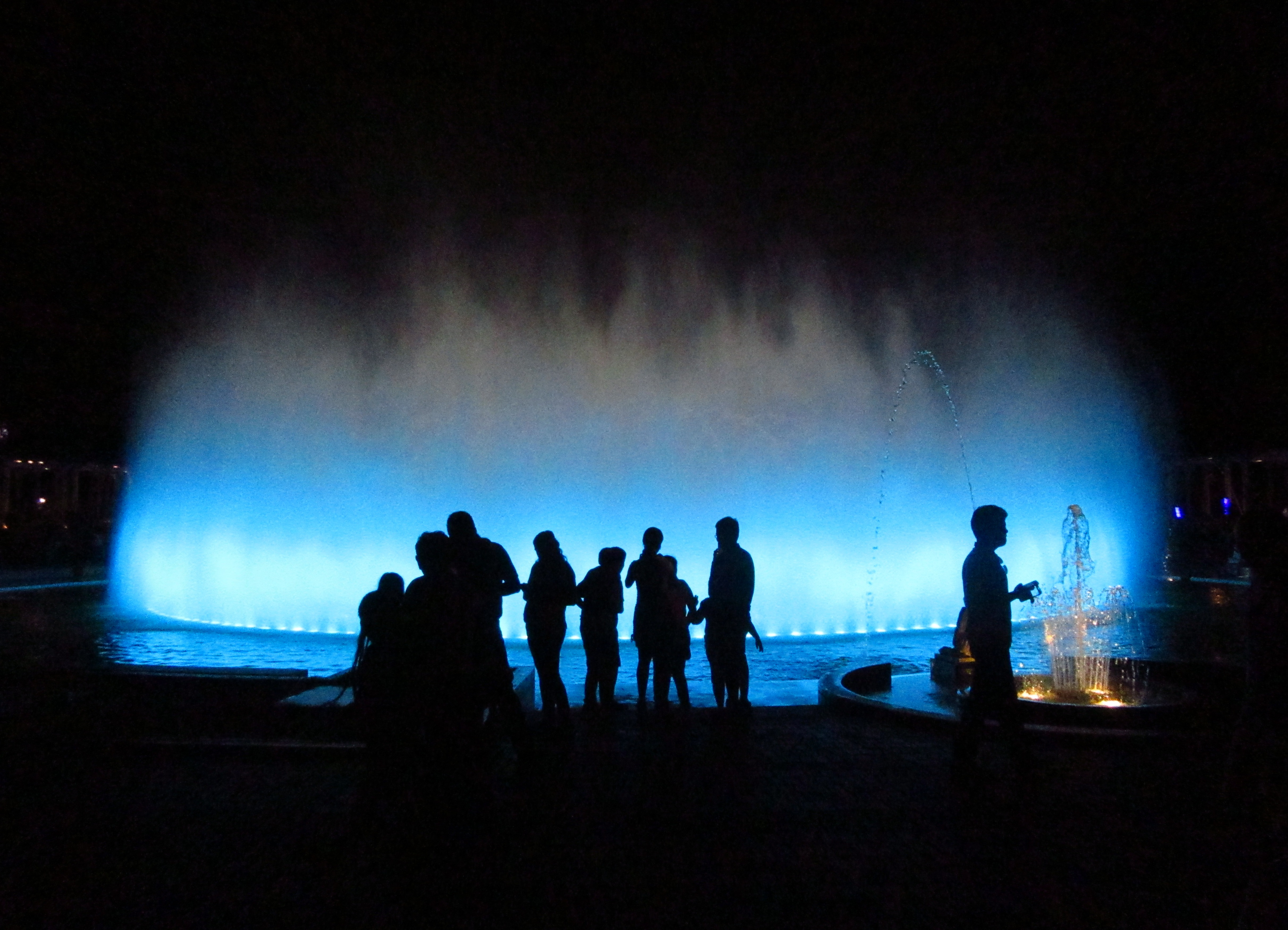
- One of the water fountains of the park
- Interactive map of Park of the Reserve
- Type: Public park
- Location: Lima, Peru
- Coordinates: 12°04′15″S 77°02′00″W
- Area: 8 hectares
- Created: 1929
- Operator: Metropolitan Municipality of Lima; Municipal Real Estate Company of Lima (EMILIMA)
- Status: Open year round, Wednesday through Sunday (16:00-23:00) and holidays
- Awards: Guinness World Record for being the world's largest fountain complex in a public park

The Parque de la Reserva (English: Park of the Reserve) is a park located in downtown Lima, in Peru. Built in an irregular shape, it is located between two of the city's principal streets, the Paseo de la República expressway and Arequipa Avenue.

== History ==
It has an area of eight hectares and is built in a neo-classical style. It was designed by the French architect Claude Sahut and is home to many sculptures built by various Peruvian artists.

Before construction, the land on which it is located belonged to the nearby Parque de la Exposición, before the area between Avenida 28 de Julio and Larrabure y Unanue Street was built over. Construction was commenced in 1926 as ordered by the president Augusto B. Leguía. It was named of the Reserve in honor of the last soldiers who fought in the Battle of San Juan and Chorrillos, and the Battle of Miraflores. The park was completed in 1929.

== Magic Water Tour (El Circuito Mágico del Agua) ==
The Magic Water Tour, inaugurated July 26, 2007, currently comprises the property of the Park of the Reserve. The project was initially criticized because of its costs and design, and that it constituted a complete renovation of a historically significant park. Additionally, others objected the charging of entrance fees to a public place (S/.4.00 for ages 5 and above, as of Jan 2011). Proceeds from this entrance fee were once being used to renovate the Municipal Theatre of Lima, which has since been reopened. By March 1, 2008, the tour received its two millionth visitor. The Magic Water Tour is currently the world record holder for the largest fountain complex in the world, consisting of 13 distinct fountains, many of which are interactive. All of the fountains are lighted at night, many with continuously changing color schemes.

The largest fountain in the Park of the Reserve, named "Magic Fountain" (Fuente Mágica) contains a jet which forces water to a height of over 80 m. Additional attractions are the Tunnel Fountain of Surprises (Fuente Túnel de las Sorpresas), a 35 m walk-thru tunnel of water; the Children's Fountain (Fuente de los Niños), a walk-in automated fountain; and a tunnel connecting the two sections of the park which contains an exhibition highlighting recent public works projects in Lima. The Fantasia Fountain (Fuente de la Fantasía), site of a regularly scheduled laser and picture show, is 120 m in length and contains jets that are synchronized to music. A video showcase of the fountains, in Spanish can be found here

== Gallery ==
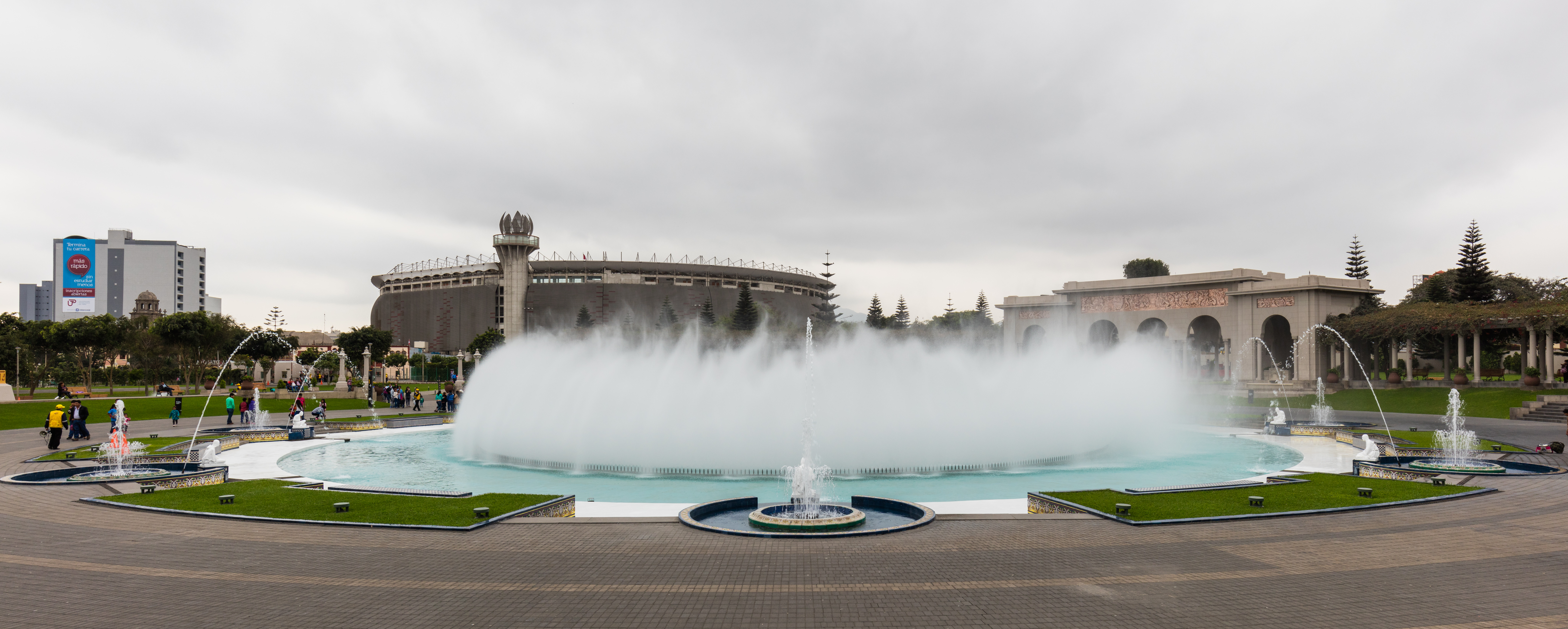

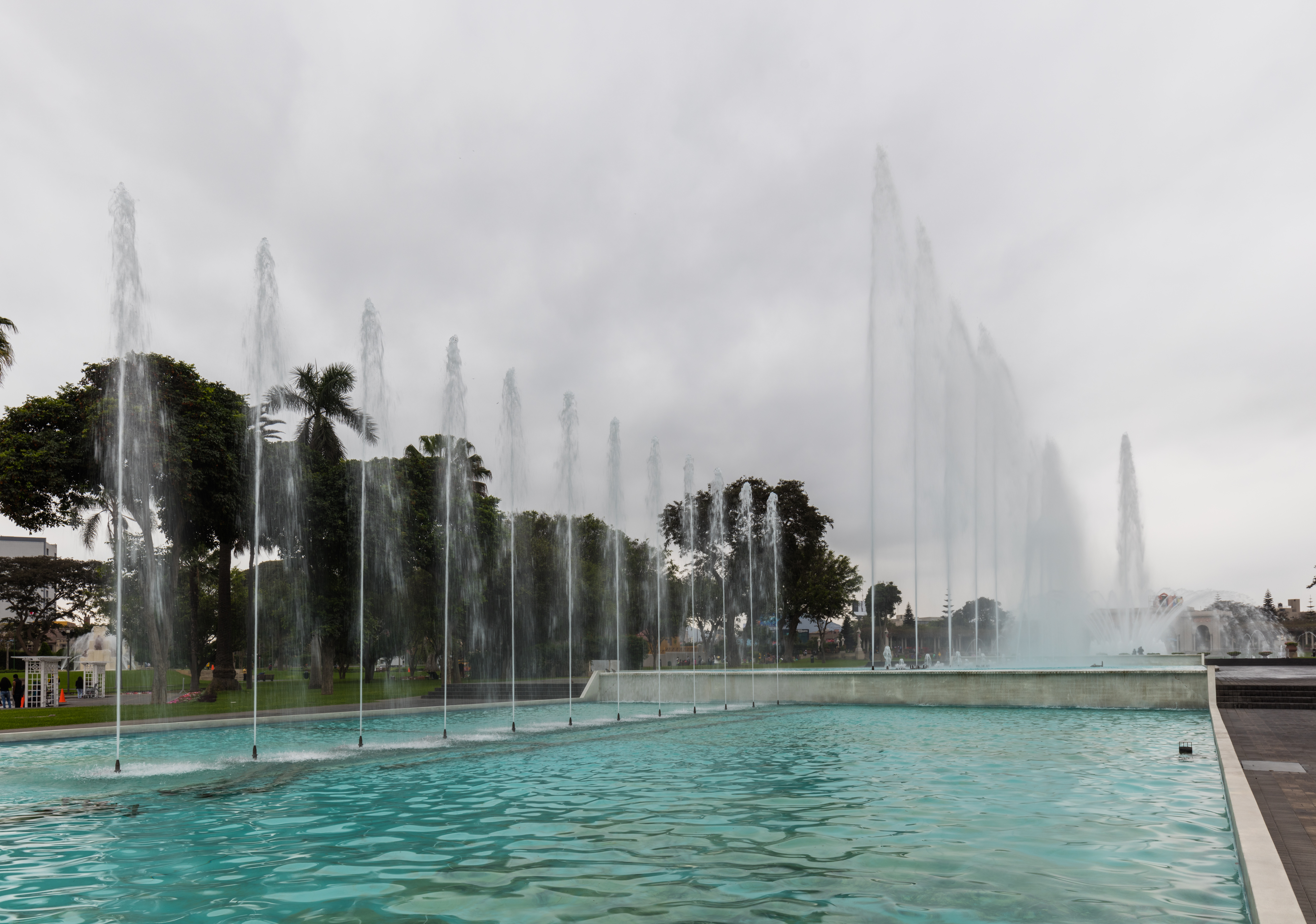

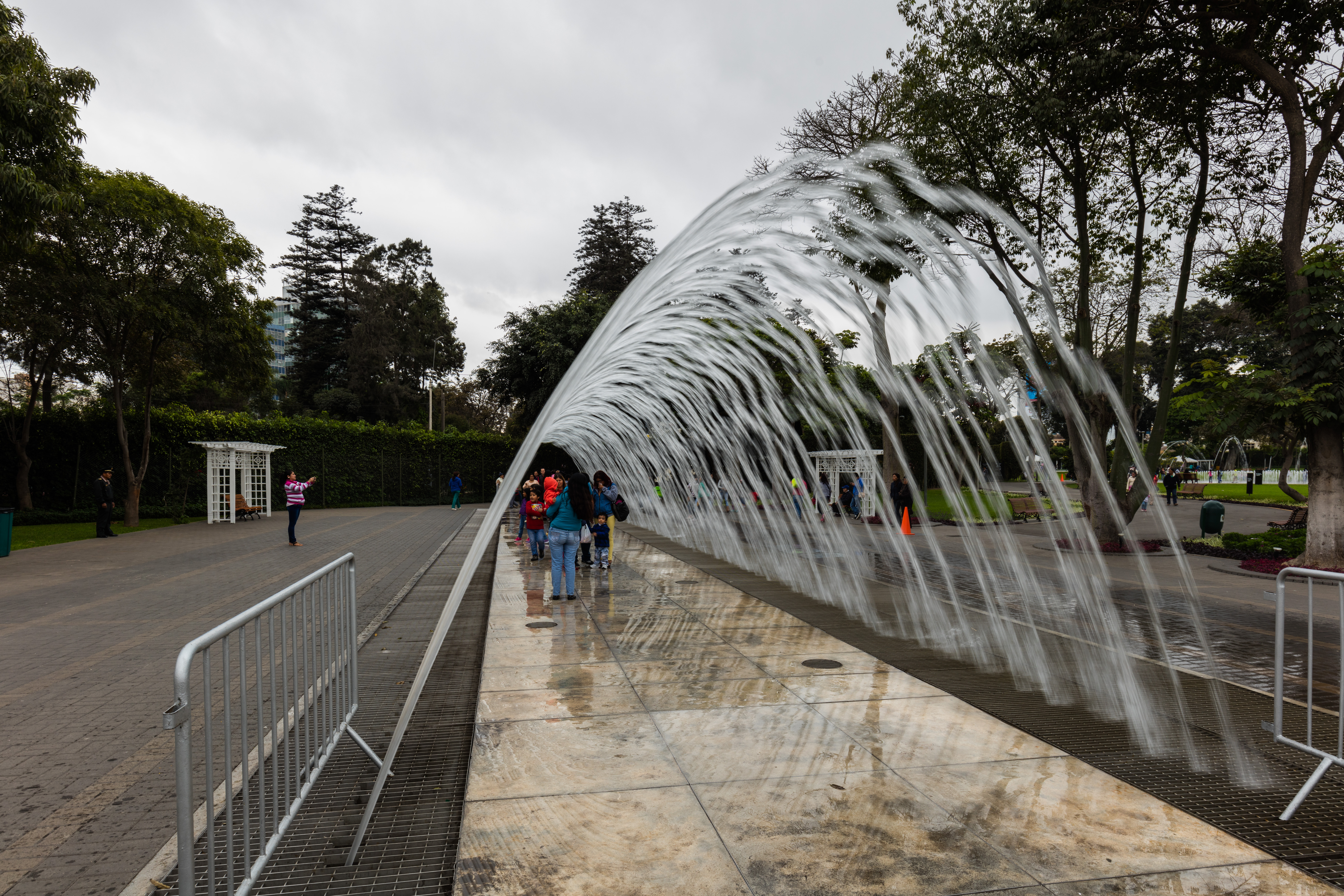

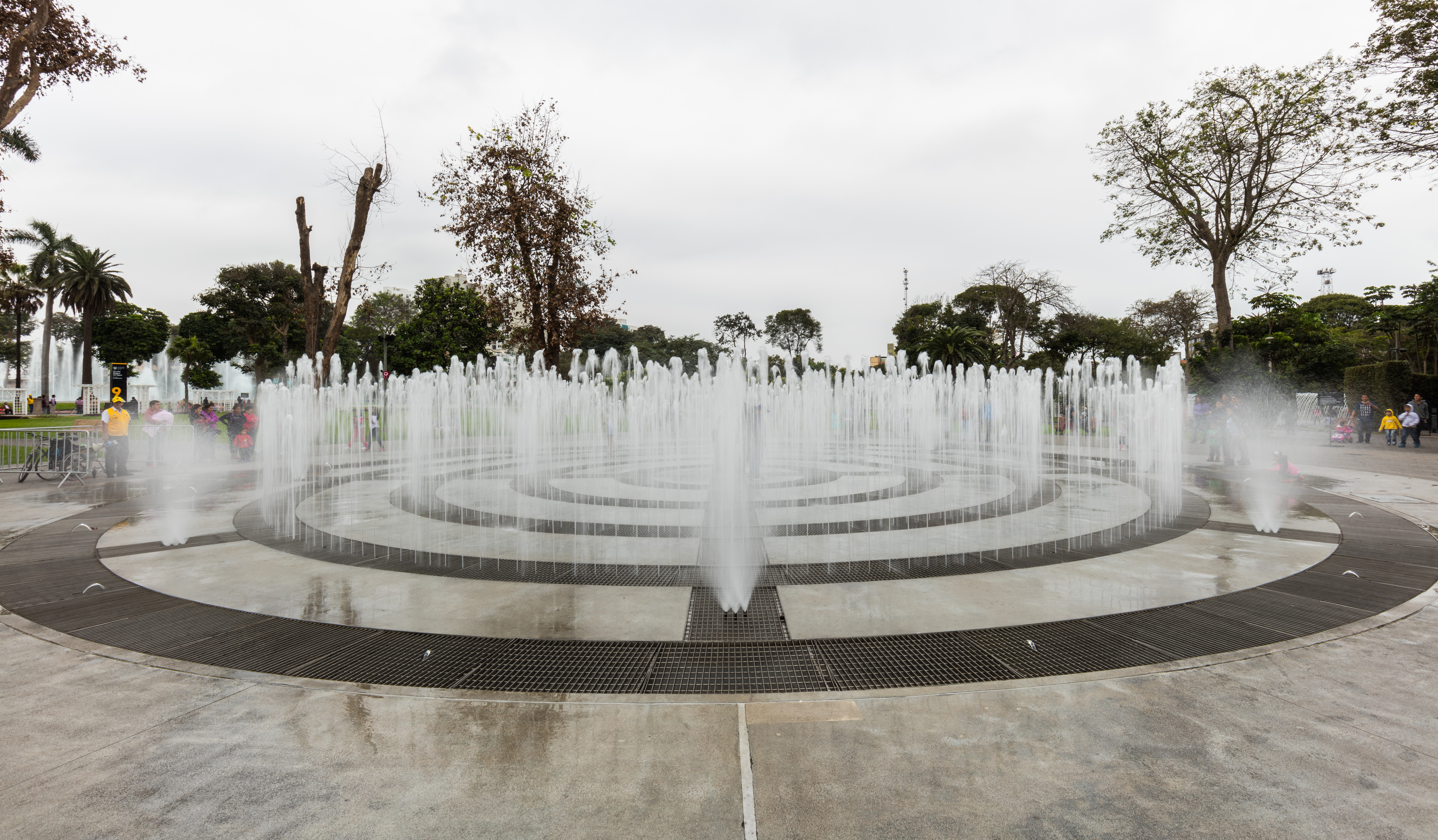

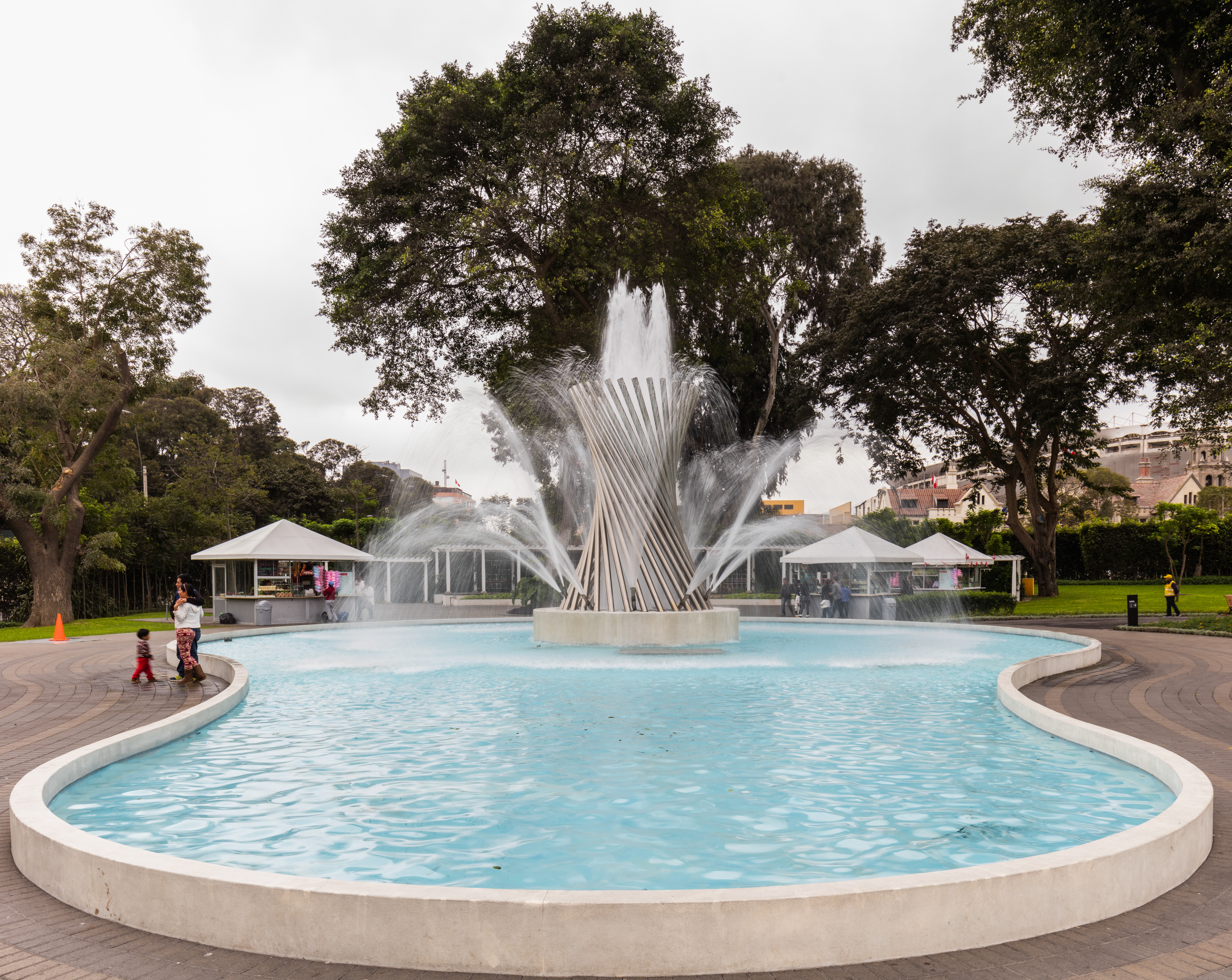

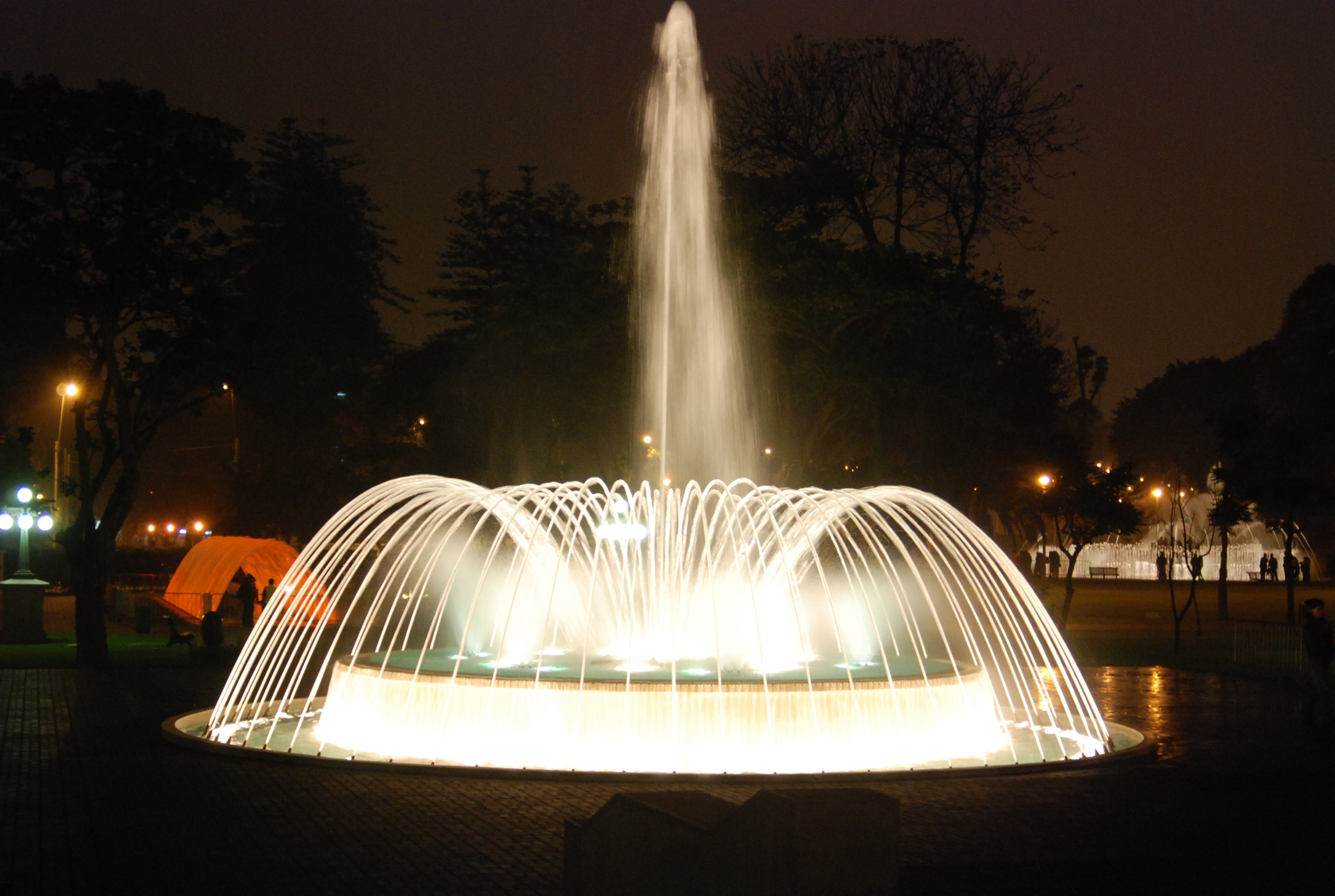

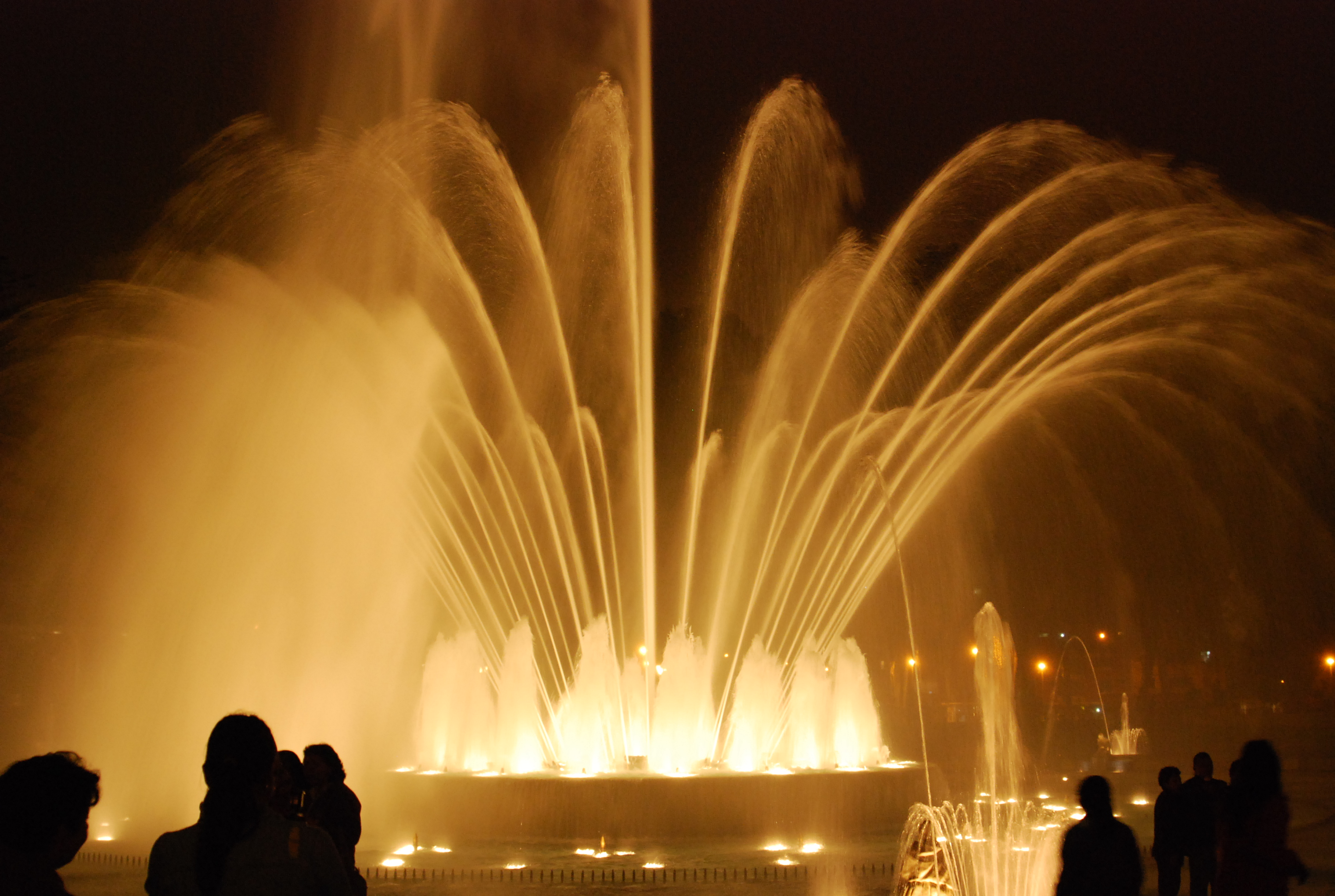

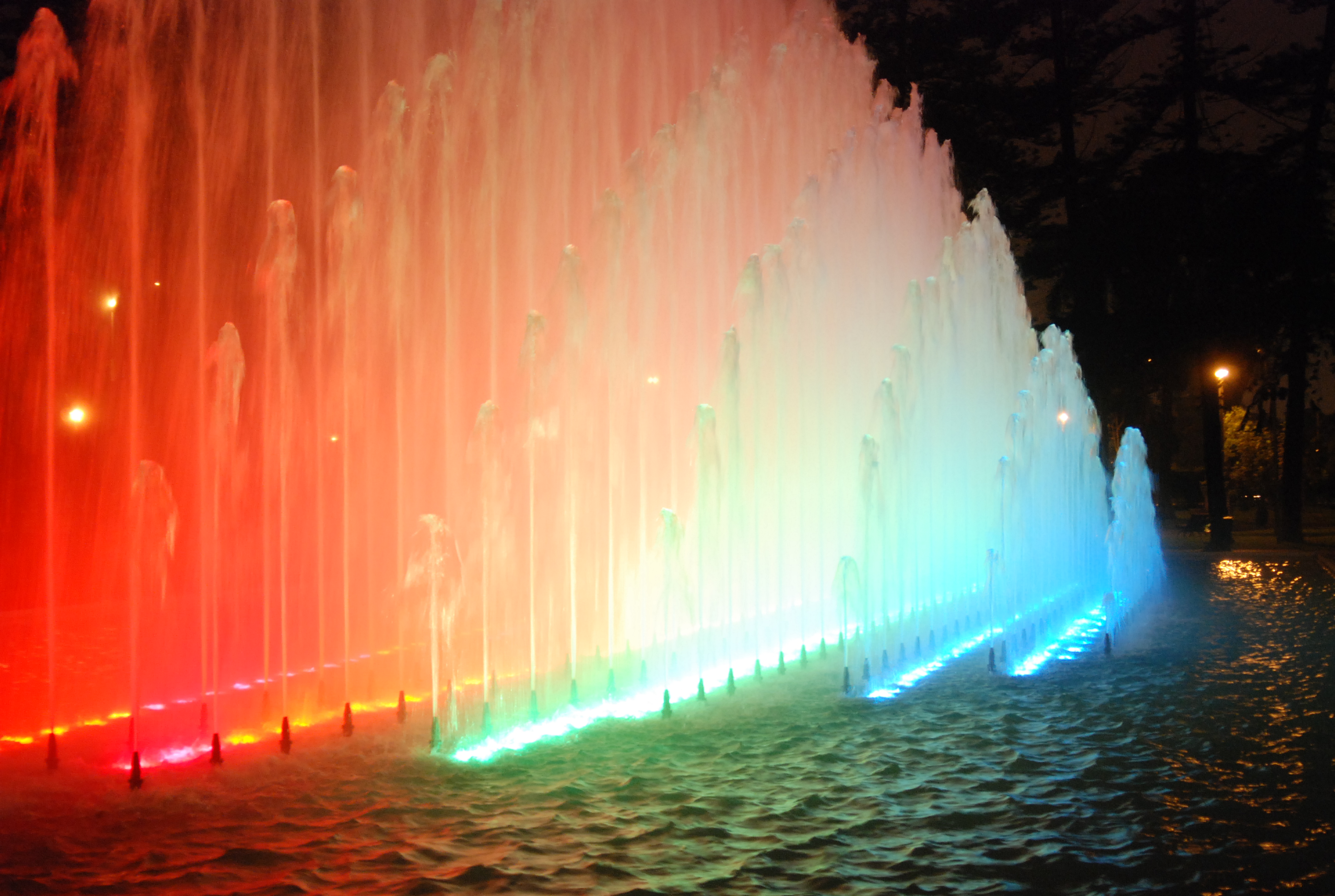

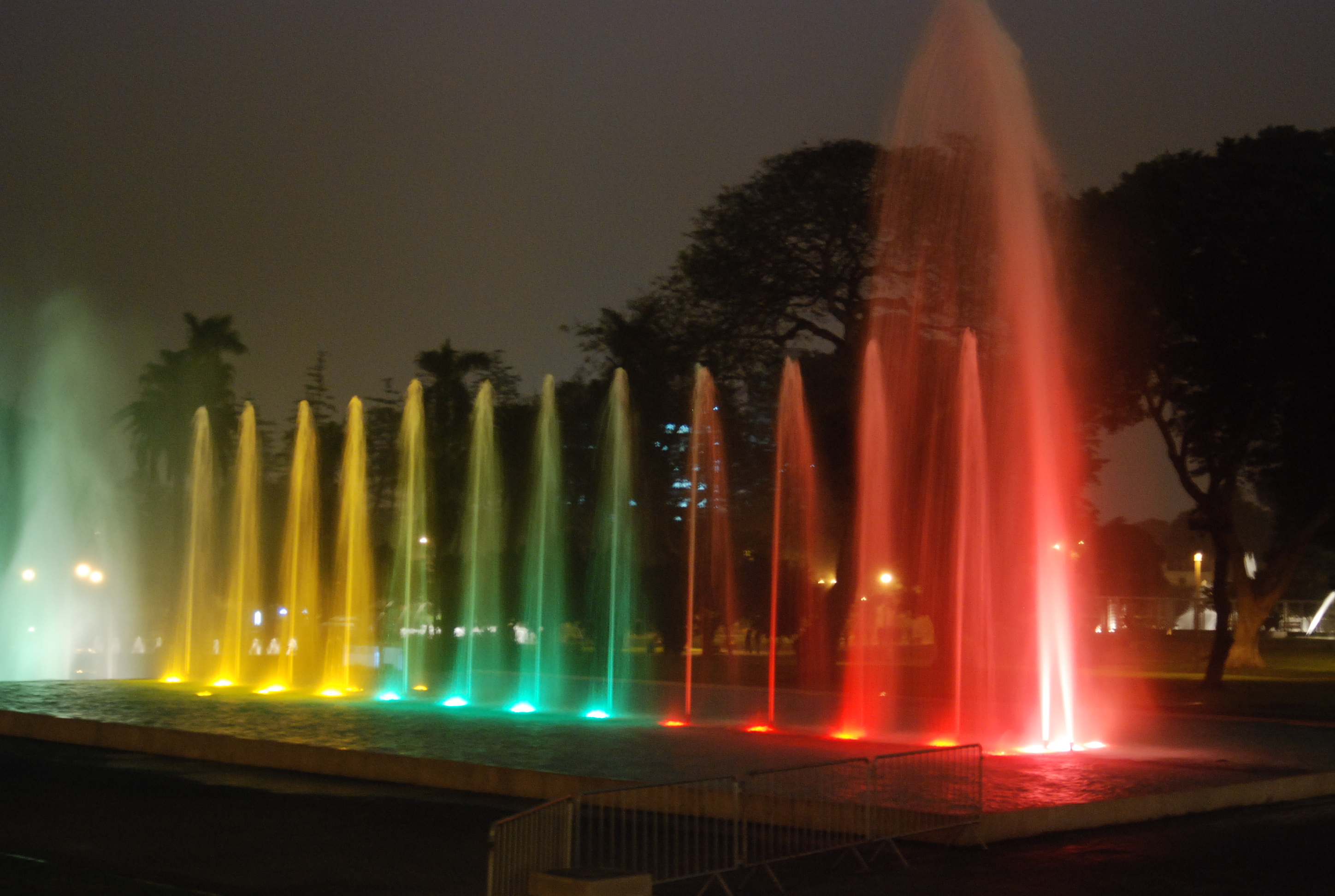

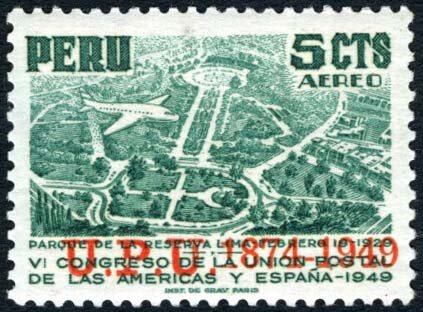
