= List of districts of Lima =

Administrative units of Lima

30 of Lima's 43 districts form its urban area.

Lima, the capital of Peru, is divided into forty-three districts (Spanish: distritos), which are further divided into several neighbourhoods (Spanish: urbanizaciones) or, alternatively, populated centres (Spanish: centros poblados). Additionally, all districts are grouped into four conos (North, East, Centre and South), unofficial subregions that make up the province as a whole.

The city is coterminous with the province of the same name, with each district being under the administration of both a local municipal government and the Metropolitan Municipality of Lima, which administers the province in its entirety. This province, alongside that of Callao, form the Lima metropolitan area.

The urban area of Lima is generally considered to be formed by thirty of the 42 districts. The remaining thirteen districts consist of mostly rural and sparsely populated desert and mountainous areas. Of these peripheral districts, many of the coastal ones serve as beach resorts and their population, which is considerably smaller than that of the urban districts, increases during the summer months.

== Districts of Lima ==
Area and population information on the following list has been retrieved from official data by the Peruvian National Institute of Statistics and Informatics (Spanish: Instituto Nacional de Estadística e Informática, INEI). Demographic data is based on the 2005 Census, carried out from 18 July through 20 August 2005. Population density is given to one decimal place in persons per square kilometer. UBIGEO numbers are codes used by INEI to identify national administrative subdivisions. Foundation dates have been retrieved from a compilation by the Peruvian Congress published in 2000.

Name	UBIGEO	Population (2017)	Area (km^{2})	Created	Map
Lima	150101	268,352	21.88	August 4, 1821	
Ancón	150102	62,928	299.22	October 29, 1821	
Ate	150103	599,196	77.72	August 4, 1841	
Barranco	150104	34,378	3.33	October 26, 1874	
Breña	150105	85,309	3.22	July 15, 1949	
Carabayllo	150106	333,045	346.88	August 4, 1821	
Chaclacayo	150107	42,912	39.5	April 24, 1940	
Chorrillos	150108	314,241	38.94	January 2, 1857	
Cieneguilla	150109	34,684	240.33	March 3, 1970	
Comas	150110	520,450	48.75	December 12, 1961	
El Agustino	150111	198,862	12.54	January 6, 1965	
Independencia	150112	211,360	14.56	March 16, 1964	
Jesús María	150113	75,359	4.57	December 13, 1963	
La Molina	150114	140,679	65.75	February 6, 1962	
La Victoria	150115	173,630	8.74	February 2, 1920	
Lince	150116	54,711	3.03	May 29, 1936	
Los Olivos	150117	325,884	18.25	April 6, 1989	
Lurigancho	150118	240,814	236.47	August 4, 1821	
Lurín	150119	89,195	181.12	January 2, 1857	
Magdalena del Mar	150120	60,290	3.61	May 10, 1920	
Miraflores	150122	99,337	9.62	January 2, 1857	
Pachacamac	150123	110,071	160.23	August 4, 1821	
Pucusana	150124	14,891	37.83	January 22, 1943	
Pueblo Libre	150121	83,323	4.38	August 4, 1821	
Puente Piedra	150125	329,675	71.18	February 14, 1927	
Punta Hermosa	150126	15,874	119.5	April 7, 1954	
Punta Negra	150127	7,074	130.5	April 7, 1954	
Rímac	150128	174,785	11.87	February 2, 1920	
San Bartolo	150129	7,482	45.01	May 5, 1946	
San Borja	150130	113,247	9.96	June 1, 1983	
San Isidro	150131	60,735	11.1	April 24, 1931	
San Juan de Lurigancho	150132	1,038,495	131.25	January 13, 1967	
San Juan de Miraflores	150133	355,219	23.98	January 12, 1965	
San Luis	150134	52,082	3.49	May 30, 1968	
San Martín de Porres	150135	654,083	36.91	May 22, 1950	
San Miguel	150136	155,384	10.72	May 10, 1920	
Santa Anita	150137	196,214	10.69	October 25, 1989	
Santa María del Mar	150138	999	9.81	January 16, 1962	
Santa Rosa	150139	27,863	21.5	February 6, 1962	
Santiago de Surco	150140	329,152	34.75	December 16, 1929	
Surquillo	150141	91,023	3.46	July 15, 1949	
Villa El Salvador	150142	393,254	35.46	June 1, 1983	
Villa María del Triunfo	150143	398,433	70.57	December 28, 1961	

== See also ==
- Administrative divisions of Peru
- Districts of Peru
