= Lince District =

District of Lima, Peru

Lince
- District
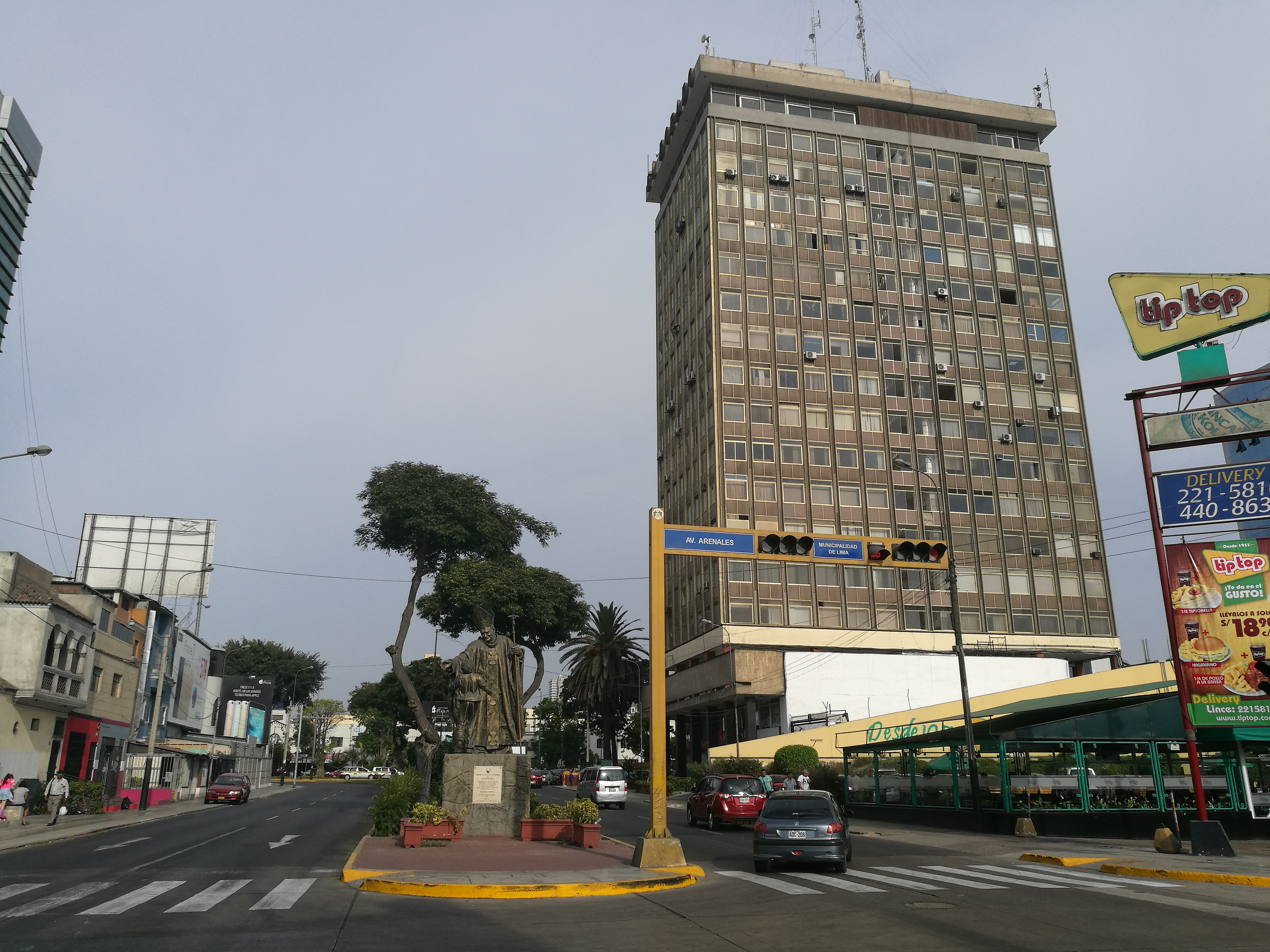
- Eastern view of César Vallejo Avenue

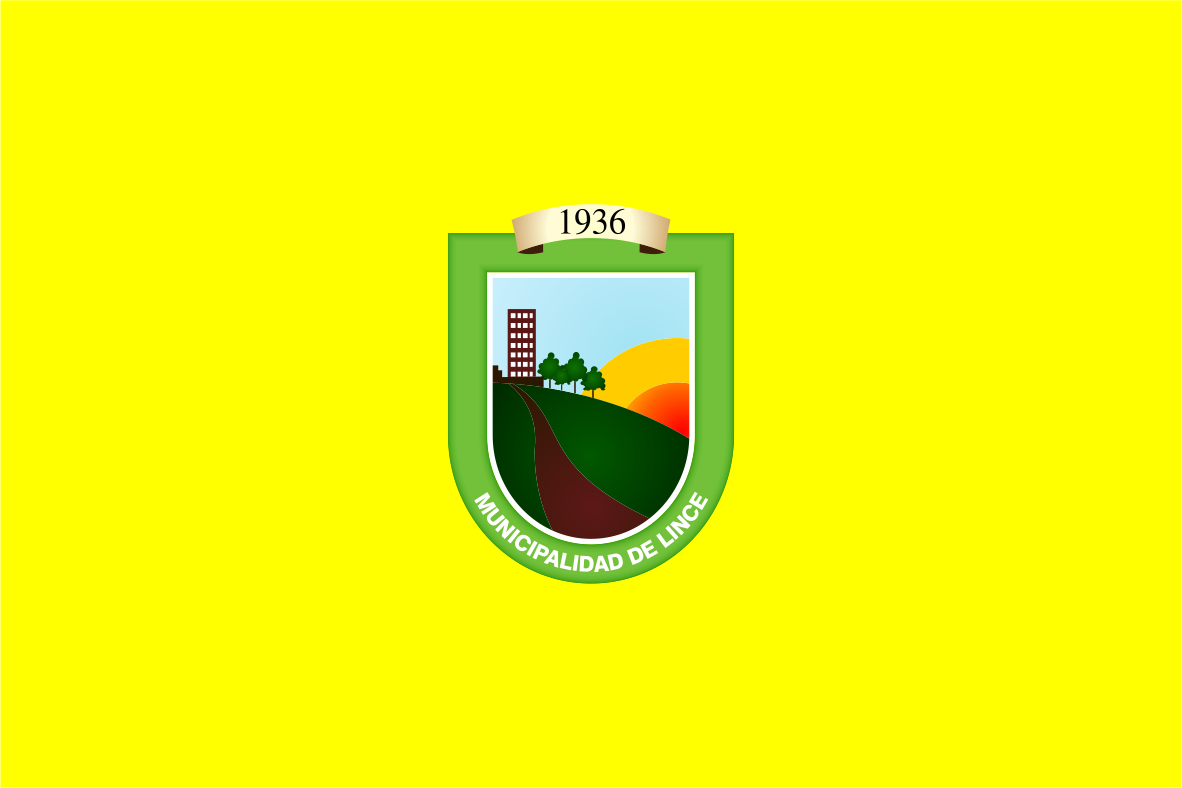
- Flag Coat of arms

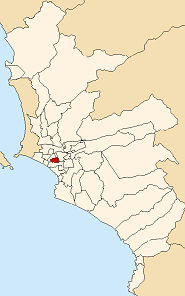
- Location of Lince in Peru
- Coordinates: 12°06′S 77°03′W
- Country: Peru
- Department: Lima
- Province: Lima
- Founded: May 29, 1936
- Capital: Lince
- Subdivisions: 1 populated centre

Government
  - Mayor: Malca Schnaiderman

Area
  - Total: 3.03 km^{2} (1.17 sq mi)
- Elevation: 117 m (384 ft)

Population (2023)
  - Total: 63,854
  - Density: 1,823,168/km^{2} (4,721,980/sq mi)
- Time zone: UTC-5 (PET)
- UBIGEO: 150116
- Website: munilince.gob.pe

Lince is a district of Lima, Peru. It is the smallest district of the city, having been officially separated from Miraflores and San Isidro on May 29, 1936.

== Etymology ==
The district is named after the hacienda of the same name. Its former name, Lince y Lobatón, included the name of another hacienda. The territory of both estates became the district in the 20th century.

== History ==
The district is partially located in what was once known as Guatca. The name applies to both a chieftainship (curacazgo) where maize, cotton, sugarcane and olives wer cultivated, and a pre-Columbian irrigation ditch that took water from the Rímac River to today's districts of Lince, San Isidro, and Miraflores. A local huaca, known as Limatambo (Limac Tampu), was demolished to build a school in the area.

Following the establishment of the Viceroyalty of Peru, the land belonged to the Convent of Santa Teresa de Jesús, after which it was acquired and renamed Fundo Lince after its new owner, the Spaniard Fernando de Lince Chávez de la Rota. Lince married María Mercedes Ramos, with whom he had four children, all members of the clergy. Following Lince's death, the estate was sold to Diego de Aliaga, Martín Cosme, Pedro de Abadía and José Santos Arismendi, who used slave labour to work the land.

In 1825, the land was acquired by citizens of the new Peruvian Republic. The estate's former workers built homes for their families, and the area's population gradually began to grow. In the 1920s, siblings Roberto and Manuel Risso purchased the Lince and Lobatón estates, being succeeded by the Brescia family. In 1916, Fernando Dodero registered the area's population, numbered at 16,000, establishing a committee for progress. The construction of Arequipa Avenue in 1921 contributed to the district's growth.

The district was created through Legislative Resolution No. 8281 of May 18, 1936, divided into three neighbourhoods (urbanizaciones): Lince, Lobatón and Escuela de Agricultura. Lince began to operate as a district on October 10, 1945, with Juan Velásquez Gamarra serving as mayor.

== Politics ==
=== Subdivisions ===
The three main sections of Lince are the West Side (also known as Lobatón), the East Side (both sides are separated by Avenida Arenales), and San Eugenio, southeast of the East Side facing the Luis Bedoya Avenue and Expressway.

North to South, Lince follows the block numbering started in Santa Beatriz section of Lima District and its parallel in Jesús María, but there are a few north-south avenues that do not have a Santa Beatriz counterpart. Edgardo Rebagliati Martins National Hospital is a common area with Jesús María, particularly on the East Side.

== Geography ==
The district encompasses 3.03 km² of land. Its administrative center is located 117 meters above sea level. It is part of Lima's Cono Centro, an unofficial subregion of the city.

=== Boundaries ===
- North: Jesús María and Lima
- East: La Victoria
- South: San Isidro
- West: San Isidro and Jesús María

=== Climate ===
Climate data for Lima
Month	Jan	Feb	Mar	Apr	May	Jun	Jul	Aug	Sep	Oct	Nov	Dec	Year
Record high °F	79	79	79	75	72	68	66	64	66	68	72	75	72
Record high °C	26	26	26	24	22	20	19	18	19	20	22	24	22
Average precipitation days	1	1	0	0	1	2	3	3	3	2	2	0	16
Average rainy days	4	2	3	2	5	11	12	15	13	7	5	3	82
Average relative humidity (%)	85	80	80	85	85	85	85	85	85	85	85	85	84.2
Mean monthly sunshine hours	179.1	169	139.2	184	116.4	50.6	28.6	32.3	37.3	65.3	89	139.2	1,284
Source: Weatherbase (Temperature, precipitation and humidity). and Universidad Complutense de Madrid (Sunlight)

== Demographics ==
According to a 2002 estimate by the INEI, the district has 70,968 inhabitants and a population density of 23,421.8 persons/km². In 1999, there were 16,907 households in the district.

== Culture ==
Although not commonly known, Lince has a great concentration of Art Deco architecture, comparable in density and style to the highly appreciated Art Deco architecture of the South Beach district of Miami Beach, Florida, USA. Many of these art deco buildings in Lince (including homes, businesses, nad schools) are well maintained and have endured little modification from their original design in the late 1930s. The area, however, is not yet regarded as a tourism district nor as a historic preservation area.

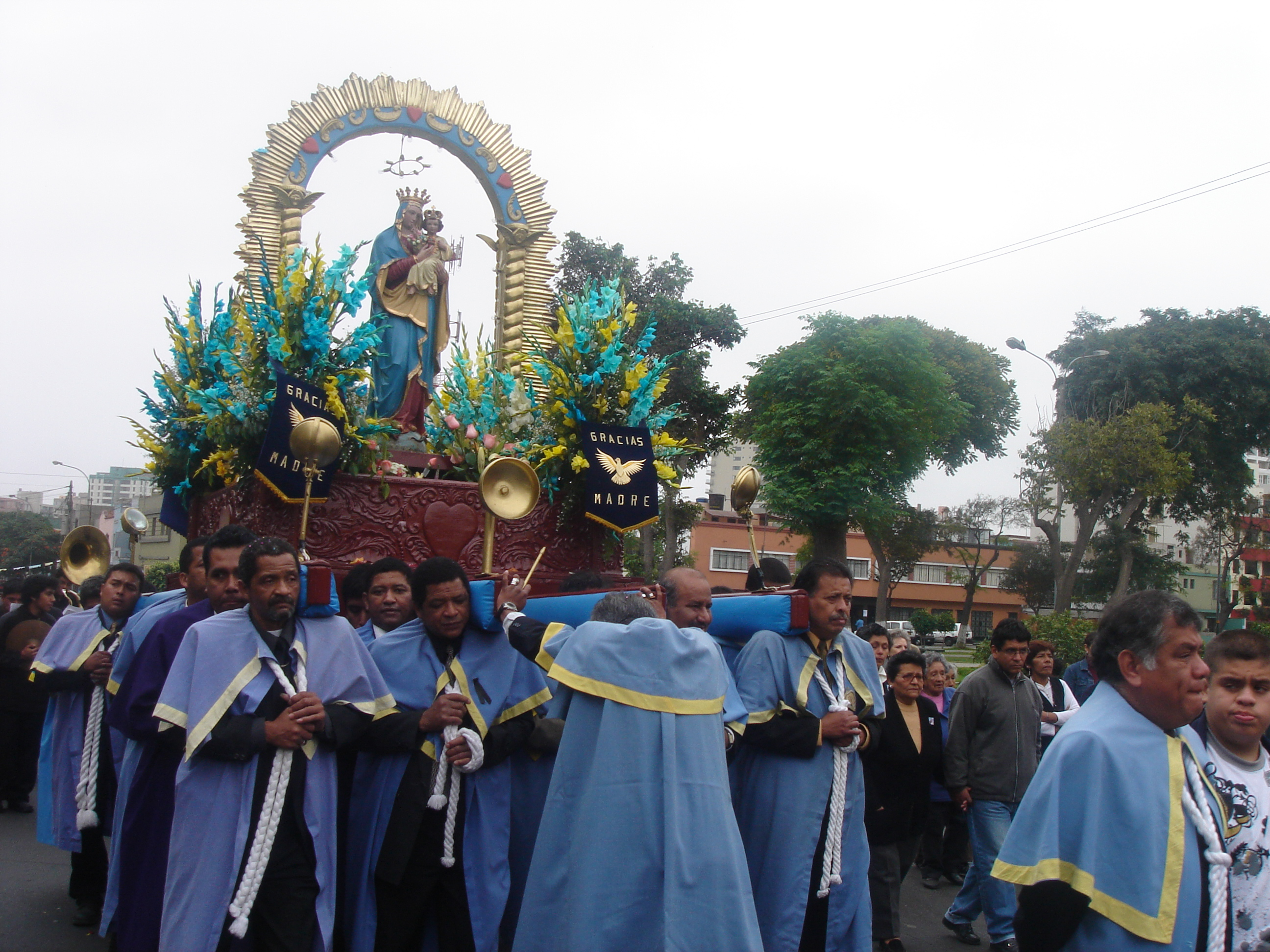
Procession of the Immaculate Heart of Mary.

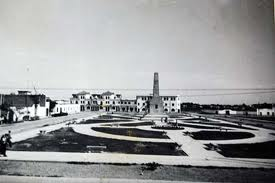
Fireman's park in Lince inaugurated in 1947 by Juan R. Velasquez, first mayor of Lince.
