= Cono Centro =

Unofficial subregion of Lima, Peru

- Subregion
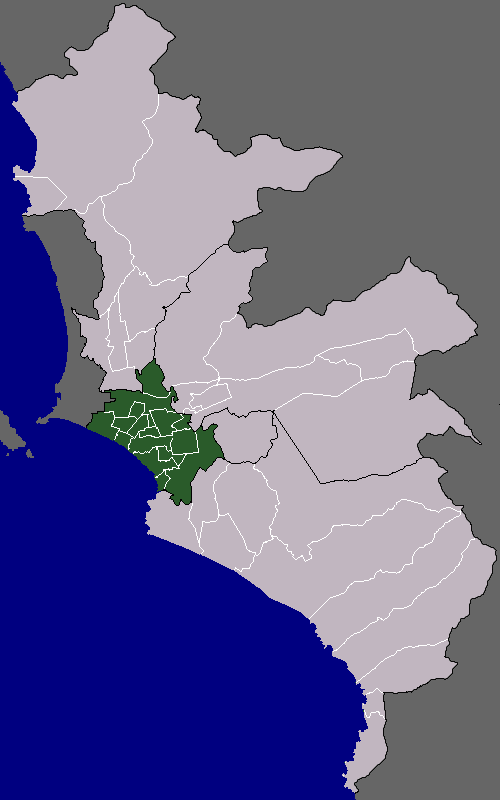
- Location of the Cono Centro in Lima
- Country: Peru
- Department: Lima
- Province: Lima
- Districts: List: Barranco; Breña; Jesús María; La Victoria; Lima; Lince; Magdalena del Mar; Miraflores; Pueblo Libre; Rímac; San Borja; San Isidro; San Luis; San Miguel; Santiago de Surco; Surquillo

Area
  - Total: 144.4 km^{2} (55.8 sq mi)

Population (2018)
  - Total: 1,784,123
  - Density: 12,360/km^{2} (32,000/sq mi)
- Time zone: UTC-5 (PET)

Cono Centro, also known as Lima Centro, is the name given to an unofficial subregion of the province of Lima, Peru. It is one of the five areas that make up Lima and Callao's metropolitan area.

As the oldest part of the city, it comprises Lima's core area, including its historic centre, from which the province as a whole developed through a process of conurbation. Of the city's 43 districts, 16 are included within this subdivision. The socioeconomic levels of its districts are varied, and their earnings account for 31% of the capital's revenue.

== Etymology ==
The term cono (lit. 'cone') was used in the mid-20th century to describe the squatted areas surrounding the city, which began to increase in number under the populist presidencies of Manuel A. Odría and Juan Velasco Alvarado. The name referred to the settlements' distance from Lima, and the word was eventually replaced by Lima, the name of the city.

== Subdivisions ==
The subregion comprises the districts of Barranco, Breña, Jesús María, La Victoria, Lima, Lince, Magdalena del Mar, Miraflores, Pueblo Libre, Rímac, San Borja, San Isidro, San Luis, San Miguel, Santiago de Surco, and Surquillo. It differs from the rest of the city's conos by being composed of the city's properly developed districts, as opposed to those referred to as "developing districts," most of which have their origins as Pueblos jóvenes.

The Instituto Nacional de Estadística e Informática further subdivides the subregion into three zones: Lima Centro (or Lima Tradicional, comprising Rímac, Lima, San Luis and La Victoria), Lima Moderna (Breña, Jesús María, Lince, Magdalena del Mar, Pueblo Libre, San Miguel, and Surquillo), and Lima Top (Barranco, Miraflores, San Borja, San Isidro, and Santiago de Surco).

== See also ==
- Lima metropolitan area
- Historic Centre of Lima
- Judicial District of Lima
