= Lima District =

District of Lima, Peru

Lima
- District
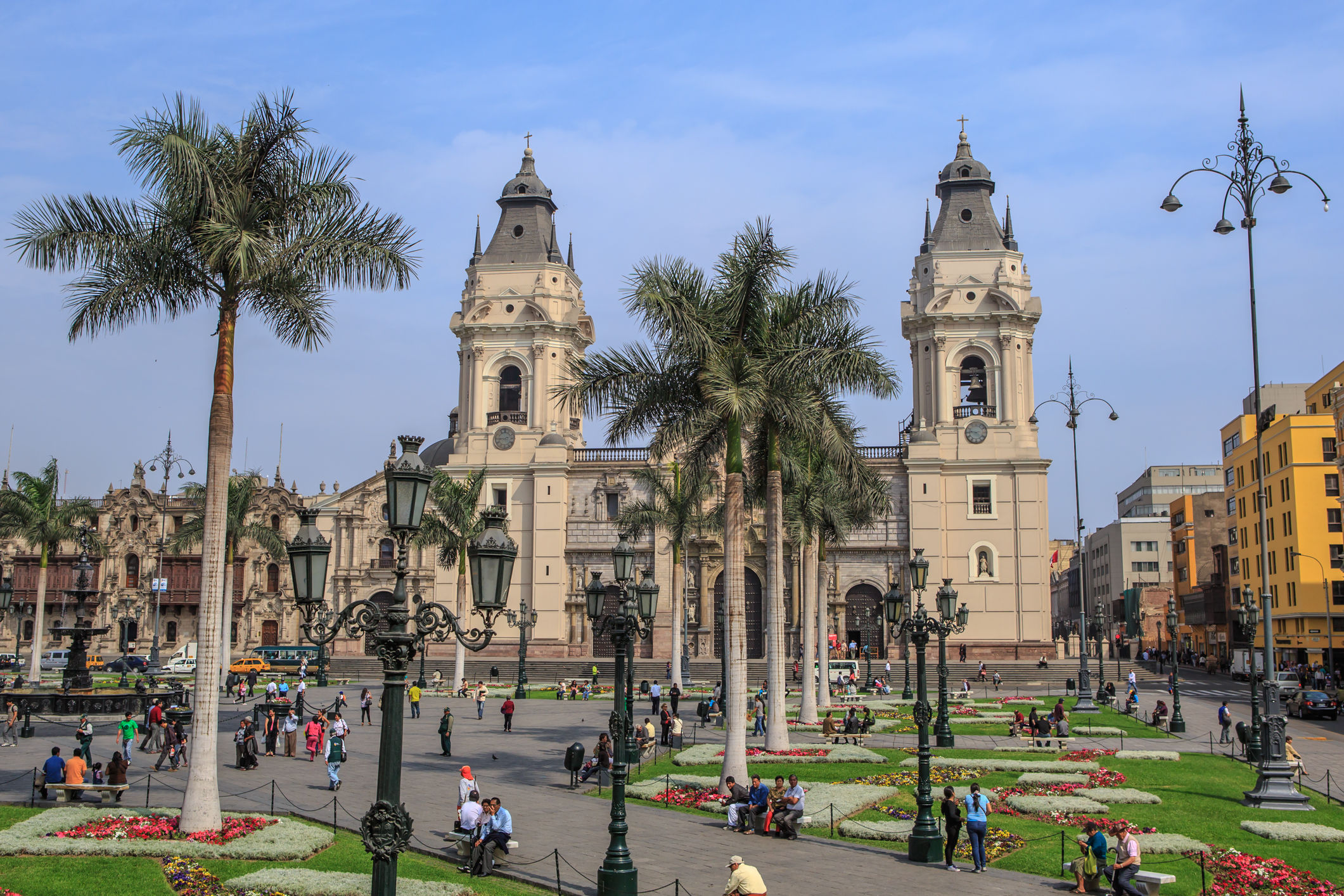
- The Cathedral seen from the city's main square

- Flag Coat of arms

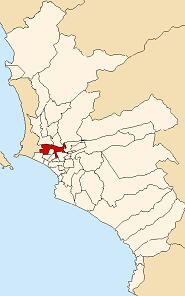
- Location of Lima in Peru
- Coordinates: 12°2′36″S 77°1′42″W
- Country: Peru
- Department: Lima
- Province: Lima
- Founded: 1823
- Capital: Lima
- Subdivisions: 1 populated centre

Government
  - Mayor: Renzo Reggiardo

Area
  - Total: 21.88 km^{2} (8.45 sq mi)
- Elevation: 2.87 m (9.4 ft)

Population (2023)
  - Total: 276,482
  - Density: 12,640/km^{2} (32,730/sq mi)
- Time zone: UTC-5 (PET)
- UBIGEO: 150101
- Website: munlima.gob.pe

Lima (Spanish pronunciation: [ˈli.ma]) is a district of Lima, Peru. It is the oldest district of the province and as such, vestiges of the city's Spanish period remain today in its historic centre, part of which was declared a UNESCO World Heritage Site in 1988 and contains the foundational area once surrounded by the city's walls.

== Etymology ==
The name of the district comes from one of two sources: Either the Aymara language lima-limaq (meaning "yellow flower"), or the Spanish pronunciation of the Quechua word rimaq (meaning "talker", and actually written and pronounced limaq in the nearby Quechua I languages). It is worth nothing that the same Quechua word is also the source of the name given to the river that feeds the city, the Rímac River (pronounced as in the politically dominant Quechua II languages, with an "r" instead of an "l"). Early maps of Peru show both names (Lima and Ciudad de los Reyes) displayed jointly.

== History ==
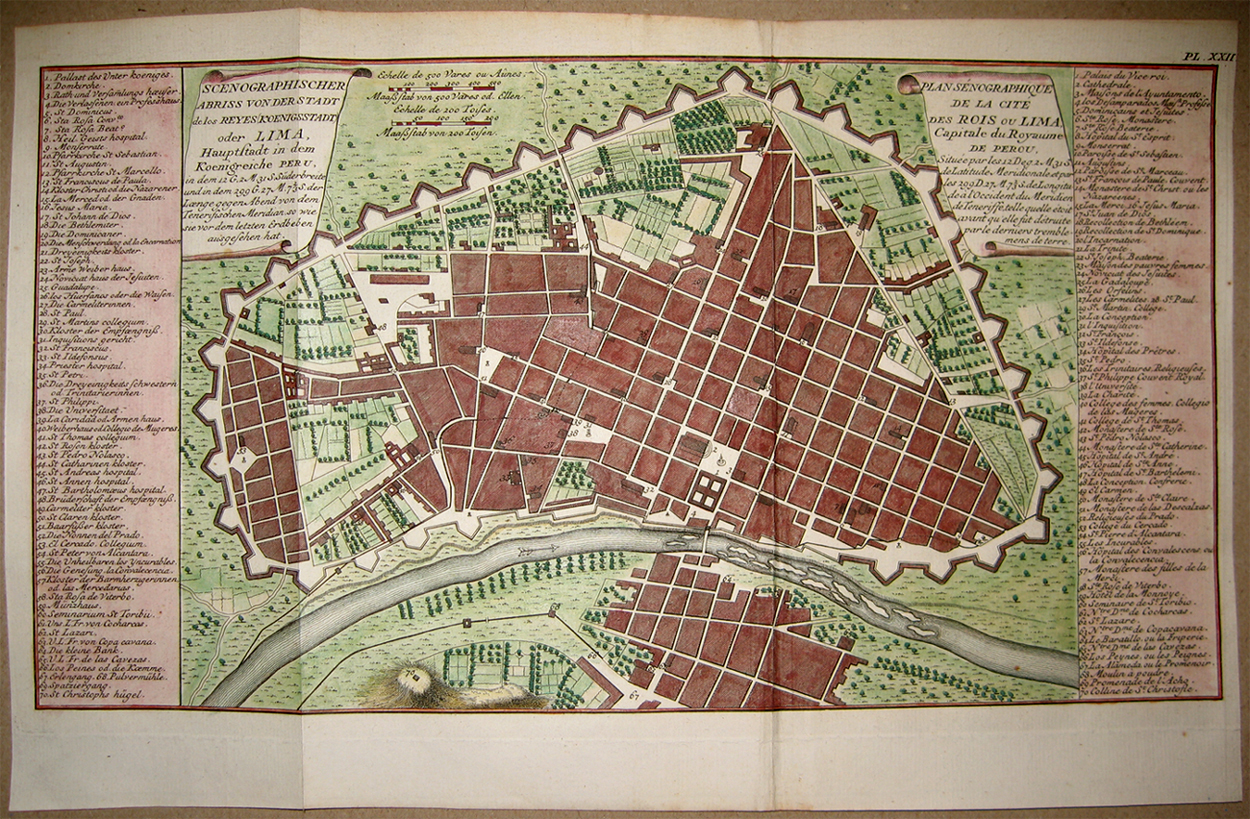
1750 map of Lima and its walls.

The city of Lima was founded by Francisco Pizarro on January 18, 1535, and given the name City of Kings. Nevertheless, its original name persisted with time.

Under the Viceroyalty of Peru, the authority of the viceroy as a representative of the Spanish monarchy was particularly important, since its appointment supposed an important ascent and the successful culmination of a race in the colonial administration. The entrances to Lima of the new viceroys were specially lavish. For the occasion, the streets were paved with silver bars from the gates of the city to the Palace of the Viceroy.

In 1988, UNESCO declared the historic centre of Lima a World Heritage Site for its originality and high concentration of historic monuments constructed during the viceregal era. In 2023, it was expanded with two exclaves to include the Quinta and Molino de Presa and the Ancient Reduction of Santiago Apostle of Cercado.

== Politics ==
The district is the site of the city's Municipal Palace, which hosts the Metropolitan Municipality of Lima.

=== List of mayors ===
Since 2023, the incumbent mayor is Rafael López Aliaga.

=== Subdivisions ===
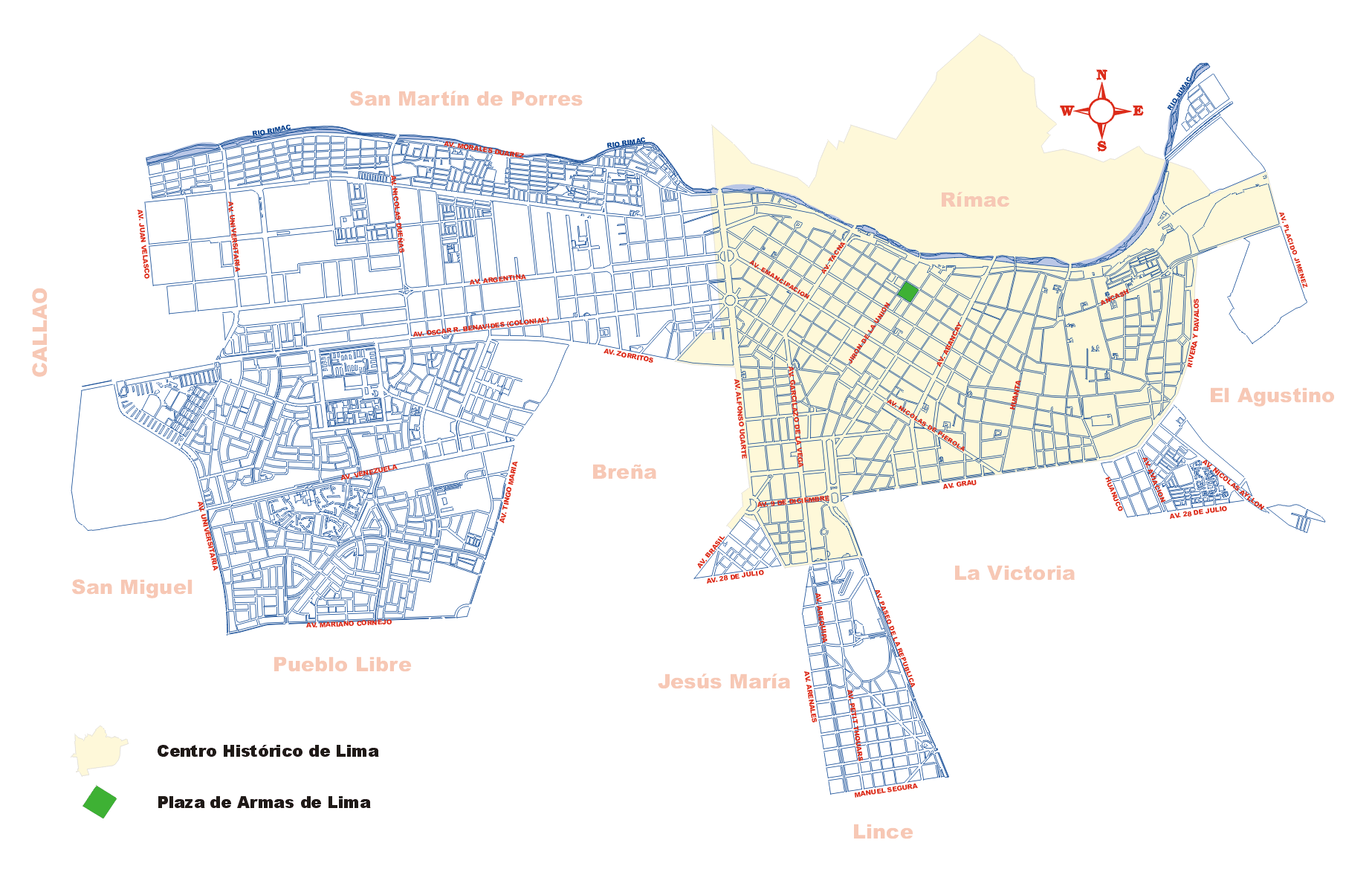
Detailed map featuring important avenues.

Lima is divided into a number of neighbourhoods and one populated centre.

- Central Lima (known as the Cercado de Lima or as the Damero de Pizarro) is limited by Alfonso Ugarte Avenue to the west and Huánuco street to the east. It is divided into West and East sides by the pedestrian Union Street, from which cuadras (city blocks) are numbered beginning at 100 and changing the first numbers at the next block. The main thoroughfares for cars and buses are Tacna Avenue on the West side and Abancay Ave. on the East. Both are separated from the Jirón de la Unión by 4 blocks. The Main Square is located on block 2 of the Jirón de la Unión, facing the Government Palace and the Metropolitan Municipality of Lima (City Hall).
- Barrios Altos, which contains the district's oldest structures, is located to the east of the aforementioned centre. Two cemeteries, El Ángel and Presbítero Maestro, form the eastern border with El Agustino. Parts of the long-demolished colonial city walls can be seen here. Abutting this to the southwest is the city's Chinatown, dating back to the mid-1800s.
- Monserrate is located west of Tacna Avenue, also contained by Emancipación and Alfonso Ugarte avenues.
- Santa Beatriz is located to the south, which contains residential buildings and the Parque de la Reserva. Santa Beatriz is locally famous for containing the buildings for the state TV network TV Perú, and the top two private TV networks, América Televisión (Channel 4) and Panamericana Televisión (Channel 5). Its main thoroughfare is Arequipa Avenue, a narrow boulevard lined with trees of all sizes. Santa Beatriz is also home to the city (and country)'s main football stadium, the National Stadium of Peru.
- The Industrial Area, an industrial belt extending into neighbouring Callao Region, is located towards the west, home to the main industries in both city and country. Most of the area is covered by large blocks containing large factories. This area includes the University City of the National University of San Marcos.

Lima is the site of a lone populated centre that is coterminous with the district:

Code	Name	Type	Population (total)	Housing (total)
0001	Lima	Urban	268,352 (2017)	91,506 (2017)

At its northern and southern edges, there are clusters of residential areas, particularly in the southern zone bordering Pueblo Libre, San Miguel and Callao Region's Bellavista District.

=== Twin cities ===
As of 2025, Lima is twinned with 24 cities in Europe, the Americas and Asia.

== Geography ==
The district has a total land area of 21.98 km^{2}. Its administrative centre is located at 154 meters above sea level. It is part of Lima's Cono Centro, an unofficial subregion of the city.

=== Boundaries ===
- North: The Rímac River marks the district's border with the San Martín de Porres and Rímac districts.
- East: San Juan de Lurigancho, El Agustino and San Luis.
- South: La Victoria, Lince, Jesús María, Breña and Pueblo Libre.
- West: San Miguel District; and the Callao Region districts of Bellavista, Callao and Carmen de la Legua Reynoso.

=== Climate ===
Climate data for Lima
Month	Jan	Feb	Mar	Apr	May	Jun	Jul	Aug	Sep	Oct	Nov	Dec	Year
Record high °F	79	79	79	75	72	68	66	64	66	68	72	75	72
Record high °C	26	26	26	24	22	20	19	18	19	20	22	24	22
Average precipitation days	1	1	0	0	1	2	3	3	3	2	2	0	16
Average rainy days	4	2	3	2	5	11	12	15	13	7	5	3	82
Average relative humidity (%)	85	80	80	85	85	85	85	85	85	85	85	85	84.2
Mean monthly sunshine hours	179.1	169	139.2	184	116.4	50.6	28.6	32.3	37.3	65.3	89	139.2	1,284
Source: Weatherbase (Temperature, precipitation and humidity). and Universidad Complutense de Madrid (Sunlight)

== Demographics ==
According to a 2005 estimate by the INEI, the district has 278,804 inhabitants and a population density of 15,736.9 persons/km^{2}. In 1999, there were 75,595 households in the district.

The high point of Lima's religious calendar for the masses is a month of festivities in October dedicated to the Lord of Miracles, during which take place several processions in the city.

== Culture ==
=== Landmarks ===
The Historic Centre of Lima is located within the district. The World Heritage Site declared by UNESCO in 1988 is divided in three sites, of which two are in the Cercado and Barrios Altos parts of Lima, while one is located in Rímac District.

== Transport ==
The district is serviced by the Lima and Callao Metro, as well as the Metropolitano bus system.

The Metropolitano bus system operates two separate lines that join at Central Station, located under the Promenade of the Naval Heroes.

- Route A runs a circuit along Avenida Emancipación and Jirón Lampa, with four stations (Ramón Castilla, Tacna, Jirón de la Unión and Colmena).
- Route B runs a circuit along Alfonso Ugarte and Spain avenues, with three stations (Dos de Mayo, Quilca and España).
- Route C, shared with La Victoria, travels through the entirety of Paseo de la República Avenue, with two stations (Estadio Nacional and México) located within the district's limits.

As of 2026, the Lima and Callao Metro operates a single line (Line 1), with a second one under construction. It has two stations (Grau and Presbítero Maestro), with a third one (28 de Julio) under construction. Another line (Line 2), also in construction, is projected to have six stations (Tingo María, La Alborada, Elio, San Marcos, 28 de Julio, and Nicolás Ayllón) that meet at a Central Station, to be integrated with that of the Metropolitano.

== See also ==
- Administrative divisions of Peru
