= Avenida 28 de Julio =

Avenue in Lima, Peru

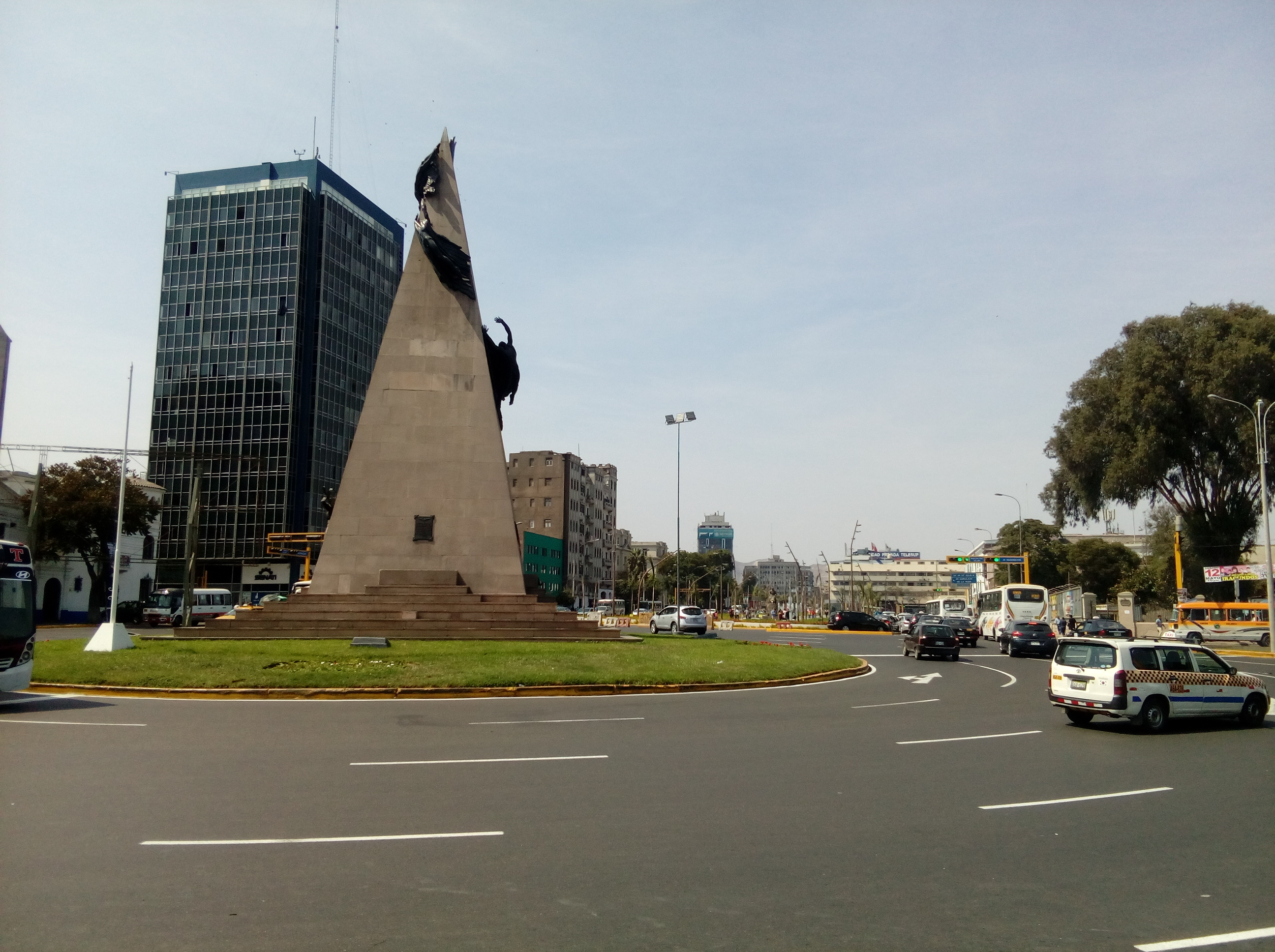
- From: Avenida Brasil
- Major junctions: Avenida Salaverry, Avenida Wilson, Avenida Arequipa, Paseo de la República
- To: Avenida Nicolás Ayllón

28 de Julio Avenue (Spanish: Avenida 28 de Julio) is one of the main avenues in the city of Lima, Peru. It extends from west to east in the districts of Jesús María, Lima and La Victoria along 31 blocks.

The avenue's length allows it to pass through several landmarks, some present to the date and some gone, such as the lagoon next to the monument to Jorge Chávez, the latter built in 1937.

A bypass was built in 2016 which replaced the Proyecto Río Verde, a plan to redesign the area of the city surrounding Rímac river, which was met with controversy.

== Route ==
It begins on the Avenida Brasil, at the triple border point of the districts of Breña, Jesús María and Lima. In its first 7 blocks it sets the limit between Jesús María and Lima. In this section is the Reina de los Ángeles school as well as the '03' wholesale market in Lima.

Between blocks 6 and 7 is the Jorge Chávez square, the confluence point of Guzmán Blanco and Salaverry avenues and the Washington shred. On this corner is the Ministry of Defense building and one of the entrances to the Campo de Marte.

Between blocks 7 and 8, 28 de Julio avenue passes over an underground overpass that connects Garcilaso de la Vega avenue to the north with Arequipa and República de Chile avenues to the south. The Argentine embassy is located in the intersection with Arequipa. Blocks 8, 9 and 10 belong only to the Cercado de Lima, there is a boulevard in the center and at the end of which is the Parque de la Exposición.

After crossing the Paseo de la República, the avenue enters the district of La Victoria. This area stands out for the presence of interprovincial transport bus terminals. In block 11, traffic with a direction of circulation from west to east is diverted by José Gálvez avenue in the direction of Bausate y Meza avenue, becoming a one-way avenue.

The Plaza Manco Cápac is located on block 13, surrounded by Manco Cápac, Bausate and Meza and Iquitos avenues. From this point on, the avenue has a more popular character, there are more bus terminals, in addition to the La Victoria Police Station, in this area there are neighborhoods such as Mendocita, Magisterial and the El Porvenir neighborhood unit. Starting from block 25, 28 de Julio Avenue sets the limit between La Victoria and Cercado de Lima, in turn delimiting the Gamarra commercial emporium to the north.

At the intersection with Aviación avenue, the construction of an underground station is planned that will form part of lines 1 and 2 of the Lima and Callao metro, while the avenue becomes a two-way artery again. In its last five blocks it crosses an area where informal commerce predominates, likewise, vehicular traffic is now very low compared to that of its first 20 blocks. Finally, 28 de Julio avenue converges on Nicolás de Ayllón avenue, very close to the border with the El Agustino district.

== Gallery ==
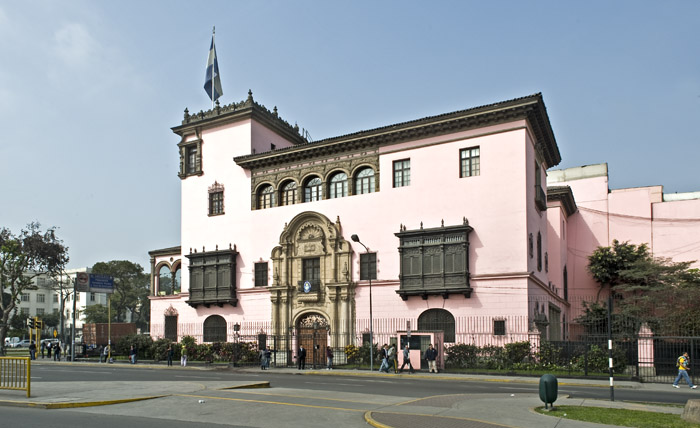
Embassy of Argentina

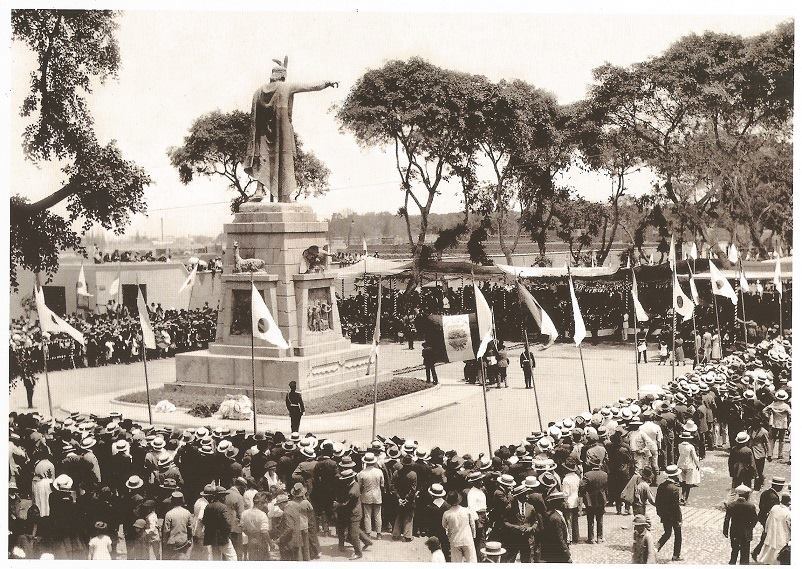
Manco Cápac Plaza during its inauguration in 1926

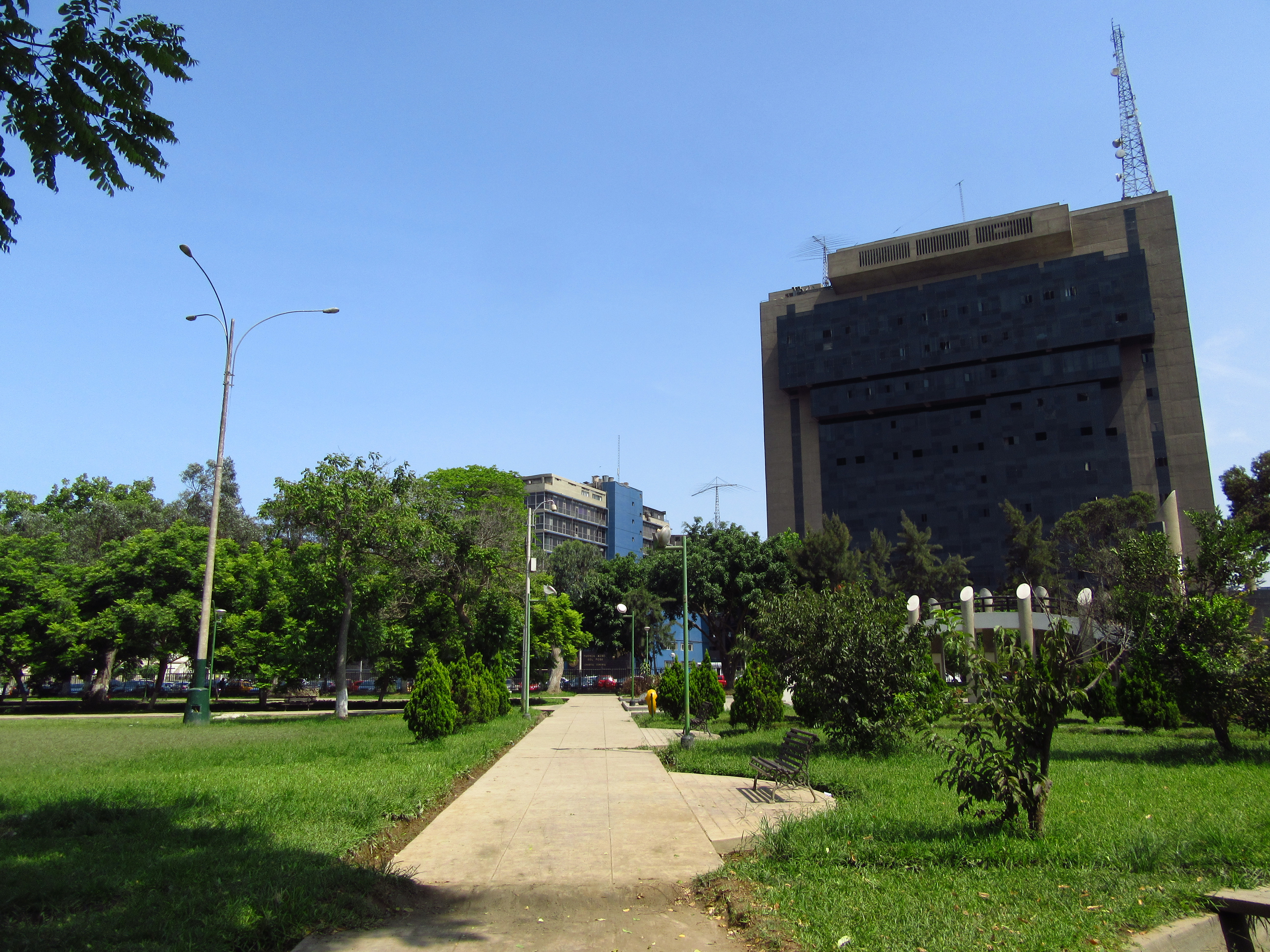
The Quiñones Building (Defense HQ) seen from the Campo de Marte

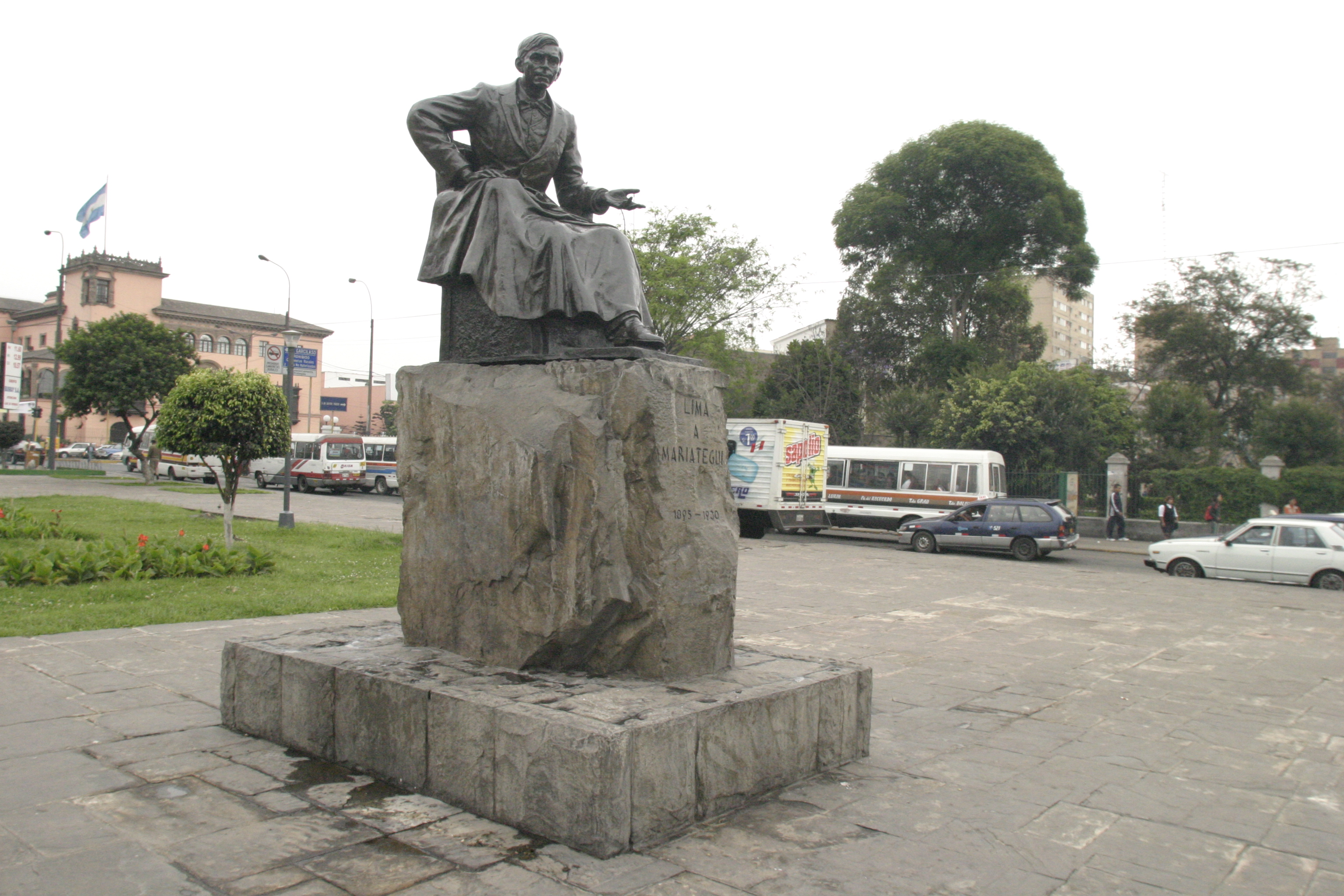
Statue of José Carlos Mariátegui
