= Avenida Arequipa =

Avenue in Lima, Peru

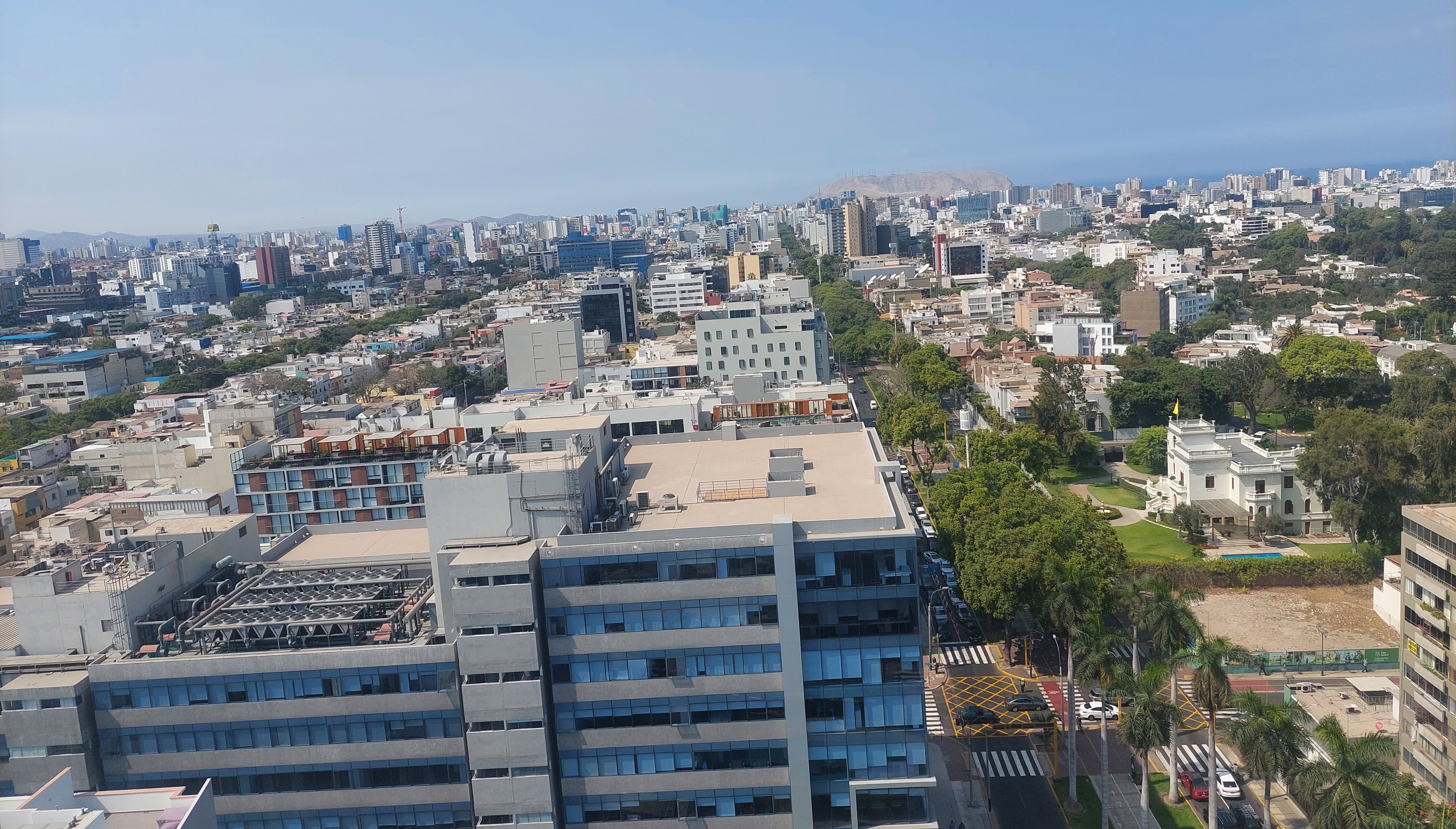
- Overhead view in San Isidro
- Former name(s): Leguía (1919–1930); De la Revolución (1930)
- Namesake: Arequipa
- From: Avenida 28 de Julio
- Major junctions: Avenida Javier Prado
- To: Óvalo de Miraflores

Construction
- Inauguration: July 28, 1921

Other
- Designer: Augusto Benavides Diez Canseco

Arequipa Avenue (Spanish: Avenida Arequipa) is one of the main avenues of Lima, Peru. It extends from north to south through the districts of Lima, Lince, San Isidro and Miraflores along 52 blocks. It has a bike path located along its entire central berm.

== Name ==
The avenue is named after Arequipa, a city in southern Peru. It was originally known as Leguía Avenue (Spanish: Avenida Leguía) after president Augusto B. Leguía. When he was overthrown in 1930, it was renamed Revolution Avenue (Spanish: Avenida de la Revolución), being soon renamed to its current name, after the city from where the uprising was launched.

== History ==
The avenue began to be opened at the beginning of the 20th century as a dividing avenue between the Campo de Marte and the Parque de la Reserva. In its beginnings, it was the road that linked Lima with the resorts of Barranco and Miraflores. It was designed by the Peruvian architect Augusto Benavides Diez Canseco.

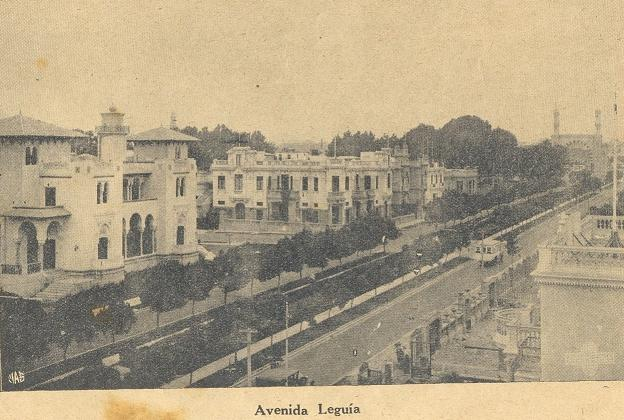
The avenue in the late 1920s.

It was officially inaugurated on July 28, 1921, coinciding with the centennial celebrations of Peruvian Independence, and named by Leguía after himself. The avenue's first block featured a monumental Moorish-inspired arch donated by the city's Spanish community, which would later be demolished under Óscar R. Benavides.

Leguía Avenue was created as an integrating axis with Miraflores, then a balneario or resort town outside of the city, which was already growing as a town, and as a guideline to guide the urban expansion that the capital city was experiencing. Its physiognomy full of gardens and large houses marked it as one of the most aristocratic roads in the city, although a large part of its route still took place between fields of crops.

In 1930, colonel Luis Miguel Sánchez Cerro launched a successful coup d'état from the city of Arequipa, which soon concluded with the end of Leguía's rule in Lima. Following the events, the avenue was renamed as the Avenida de la Revolución. However, due to its insurgent character, the avenue was soon renamed again after the city from where Sánchez Cerro's uprising.

=== Recent history ===
Over the years, the large houses that once characterised the avenue have gradually disappeared, as has its residential nature. It is currently a commercial axis of the city, which includes a large number of educational centres, such as pre-university academies, regular schools, institutes of higher education and universities.

Prior to the implementation of the SIT, the avenue was the seventh most congested road in Lima due to the excessive circulation of public transport units.

== Transport ==
The avenue one lane on each direction reserved for the Integrated Transport System (SIT), the city's bus system.

=== Bus service ===
The avenue is serviced by the Corredor Azul, a bus route of the SIT.

== See also ==
- Avenida Petit Thouars
