= Parque de la Exposición =

Park in Lima, Peru

Coordinates: 12°03′41″S 77°02′12″W

Park of the Exhibition
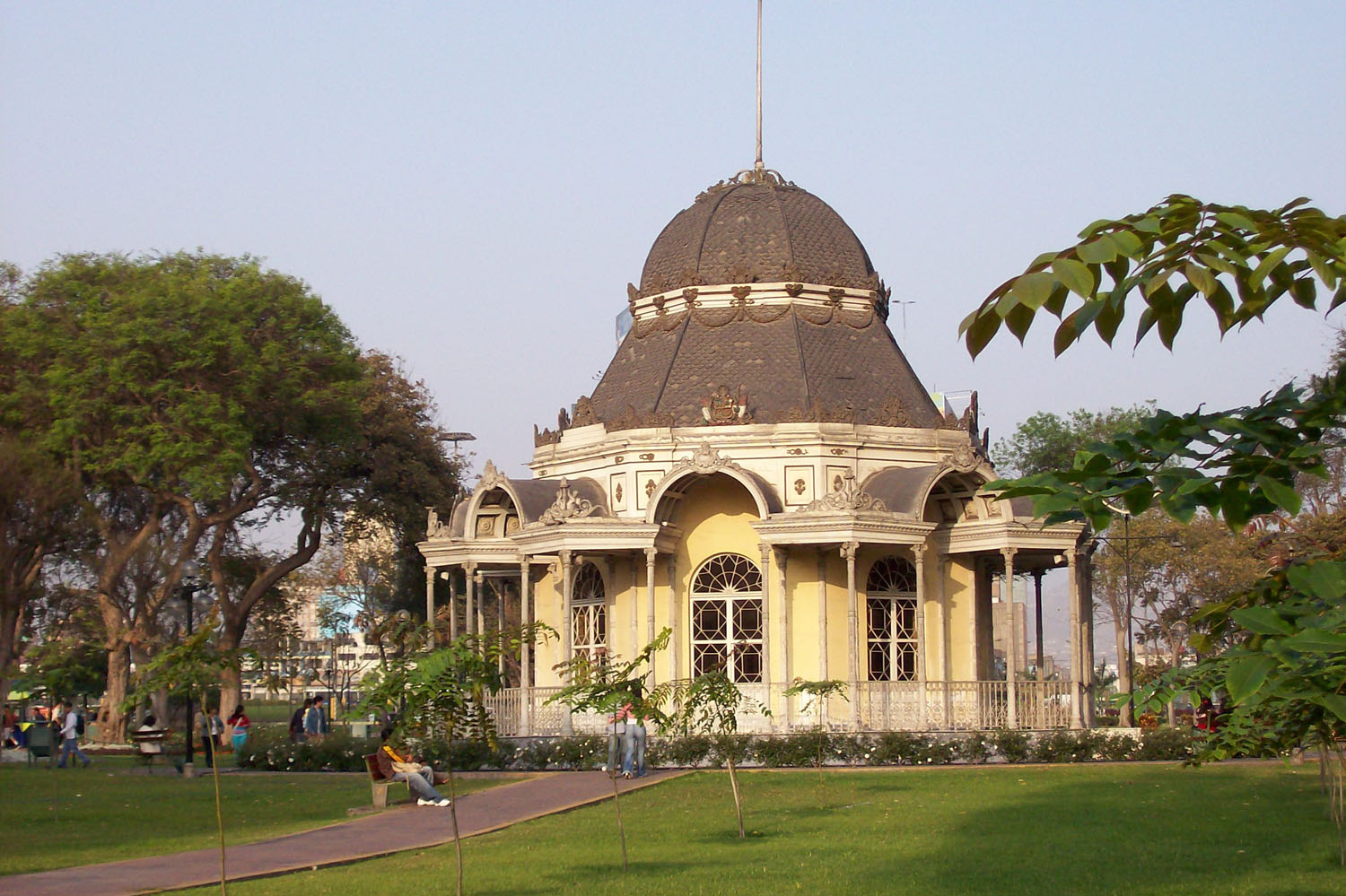
- Byzantine Pavilion
- Interactive map of Park of the Exhibition
- Type: Public park
- Location: Santa Beatriz, Lima
- Area: 112,804 m^{2}
- Created: July 1, 1872
- Operator: Empresa Municipal Inmobiliaria de Lima (EMILIMA)

The Park of the Exhibition (Spanish: Parque de la Exposición), known between 1999 and 2004 as the Grand Park of Lima (Spanish: Gran Parque de Lima), is a park located in the neighbourhood of Santa Beatriz, itself part of the buffer zone of the historic centre of Lima, Peru. It was built to replace the city's walls, demolished as part of a citywide renovation project in order to host an international exhibition in 1872.

== History ==
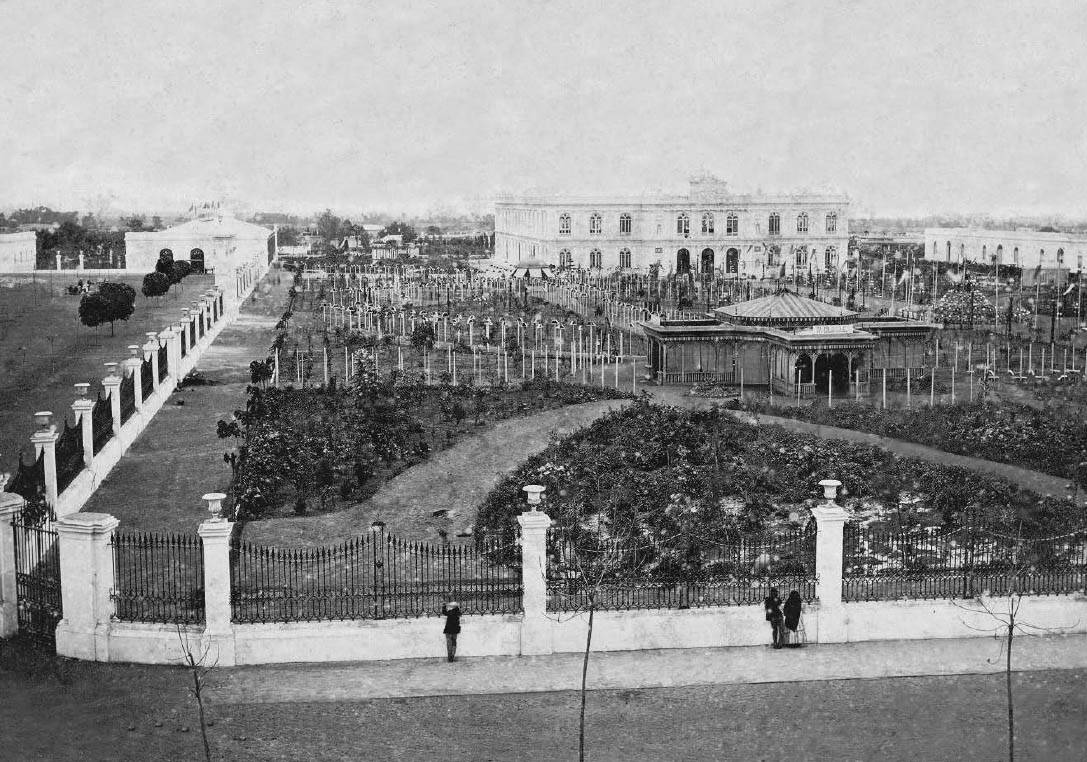
The park and its former square (left) in 1871

The park was occupied by the south gate of the Walls of Lima, known as Puerta de Guadalupe. In the 1870s President José Balta ordered the demolition of these walls within its modernisation plan of the city. It was planned that this location would be aimed at building a park that would house the Lima International Exhibition of 1872. Thus, alongside the park, rose the Palacio de la Exposición (now the Lima Art Museum).

The park plan was made by Manuel Atanasio Fuentes and Italian architect Antonio Leonardi. Its design was neo-Renaissance and included the construction of pavilions including a zoo and other buildings. Leonardi also designed the Palacio de la Exposición. In the beginning the largest, covering the current and contemporary Park of the Reserve and the land where now stands the Estadio Nacional, were part of the park.

=== Zoo ===
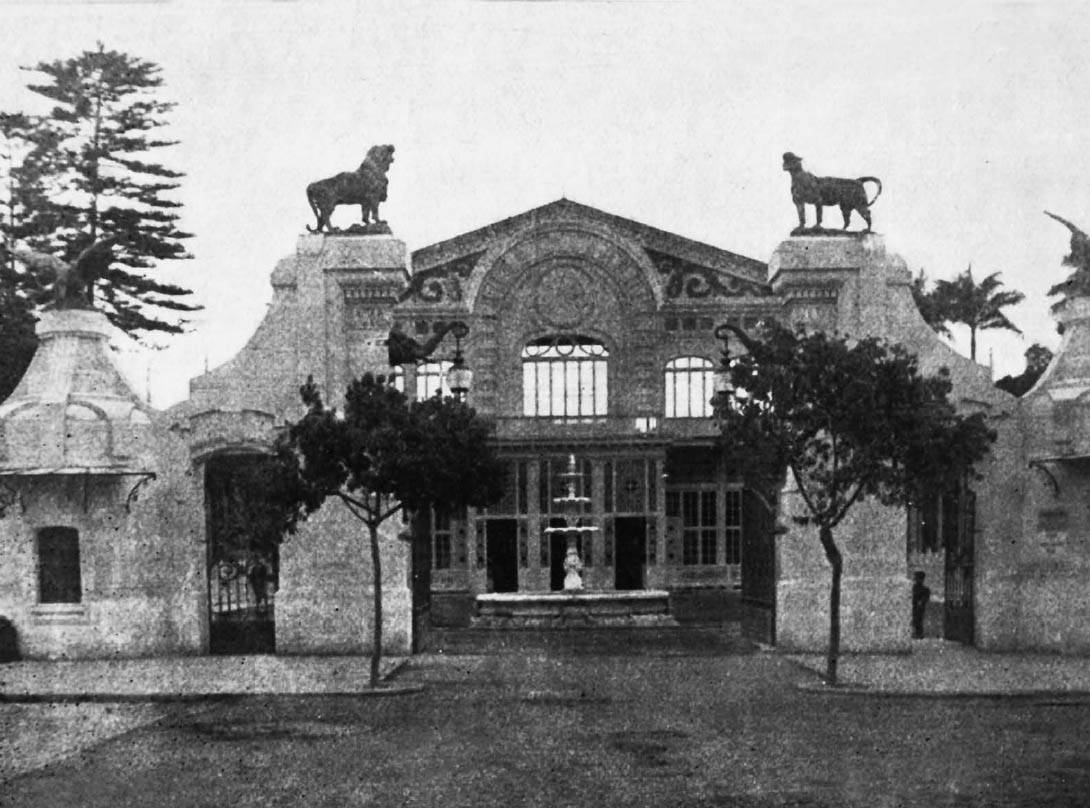
Entrance to the Zoo in 1911

Among the park's features was a zoo, whose animals (and plants) were brought from the Peruvian Amazon by an expedition headed by Henrique Casseu in 1871. The expo's catalog lists a total of 271 different species of animals. In addition to this collection, donations were also made, such as that of Peruvian minister in Brazil Luis Mesones, who donated two tigers that arrived via boat.

After the exhibition ended, the part of the zoo that faced the (now demolished) square of the same name remained. With the construction of the Paseo Colón in 1899, a new entrance was built. It was completely destroyed during the War of the Pacific by the Chilean Army as part of its occupation of the city, with some animals killed and others stolen by the invading army, as was the case of the lions taken to Santiago Zoo.

After the war, the zoo was reestablished through donations from locals and eventual foreign acquisitions, existing until its decay in the early 20th century, caused by poor hygiene conditions and improper care of the animals, the growth of the city, and the worldwide crisis. In 1935, on the city's 400th anniversary, mayor Luis Gallo Porras ordered that the zoo be moved to Barranco District, which was not done until 1944. This new zoo closed in 1970, replaced by the Parque de las Leyendas.

=== Post-Exhibition ===
During the War of the Pacific, the park housed a garrison and a hospital prior to the occupation, later serving as a headquarters for the Chilean troops.

With the celebration of the centennial of the independence of Peru, Augusto B. Leguía ordered the construction of several additional buildings, such as the Byzantine Hall and the building that served as headquarters of the Ministry of Development and Public Works, which currently houses the Metropolitan Museum of Lima since 2010.

In 1961 the demolition of the so-called Panopticon was ordered, to be replaced by the Civic Centre construction project. The land north of the park, currently home to the Centre for Military and Historical Studies and the Museum of Italian Art, originally belonged to the park itself.

During the 1970s, the park fell into a severe decline. In the 1990s, during the administration of Alberto Andrade, it was restored and lakes and an amphitheatre were created and the park opened to the park. Andrade renamed the park calling it the Grand Park of Lima (Spanish: Gran Parque de Lima) but it later returned to its original name.

== Landmarks ==
Name	Notes	Photo
Buildings
Palace of the Exhibition	The palace was built alongside the park, between 1870 and 1871. It was raised on land formerly belonging to the San Martín and Santa Beatriz fundos. It housed a monumental clock until the War of the Pacific, when it was looted and taken to Santiago. It currently houses the Lima Art Museum.	
Byzantine Pavilion	Also known as the President's Pavilion, it was built during the government of Augusto B. Leguía as part of the centennial celebrations.	
Moorish Pavilion	Originally known as the Gothic Pavilion, it was also built under Leguía as part of the centennial celebrations.	
Metropolitan Museum	The building, designed by Claude Sahut, was part of the centennial works and once housed the Ministry of Development and Public Works. On October 10, 2010, the museum was inaugurated.	
La Cabaña Theatre	It currently functions as the headquarters of the National Higher School of Dramatic Art.	
Nicomedes Santa Cruz amphitheatre	Part of the 1999 works, it has a seating capacity of 4,500 people.	
Museum of Italian Art	The work of Gaetano Moretti, it was part of the centennial works and a gift to the city by its Italian community.	
Centre for Military Historical Studies	Originally the Peruvian Pavilion at the Exposition Universelle of 1900 in Paris, it was disassembled and rebuilt in Peru. It housed the National Institute of Hygiene and later a Traffic Command until 1960, when it was donated to the Armed Forces.	
Seismographic Pavilion	Once the site of the first seismographic observations of Peru, headed by scientist Scipión Llona, it currently functions as an infirmary. Restoration works were carried out in 1981 by architect Jorge Cosmópolis.	
Tea House	Named Waseian in its commemorative plaque. It is part of the Japanese Garden, founded in 1974.	
Sculptures
Chinese Fountain	Donated by the Chinese colony, its design represents the white, the yellow and black races. On the sides are two allegories that represent the Amazon and Yellow rivers, made in bronze by the sculptor Ettore Graziosi. There are also four representations of the Raimondi Stele from the Chavín culture.	
Neptune Fountain	The fountain is named after the sculpture of the Roman god, the work of Vital Gabriel Dubray, which was acquired by the Peruvian government for the 1872 fair. It was looted during the occupation of Lima, but eventually returned to its original location.	
Fountain of the Traditions	It was inaugurated on February 7, 1962, by Mayor Héctor García Ribeyro in honour of Ricardo Palma. Its sculptures are the work of Manuel Piqueras Cotoli and the platform that houses them was made by Juan Benites Dubeau.	
Manuel Candamo Monument	It was first inaugurated in 1912, the first statue represented Manuel Candamo with the presidential chair. After a dynamite attack in 1913, the monument was reinaugurated in 1926.	
Juana Alarco de Dammert Monument	Made by the sculptor David Lozano and inaugurated in 1922 to conmemorate the Juana Alarco de Dammert, a philanthropist nicknamed as "the grandmother of the children". The first Mother's Days of the city were celebrated near the statue.	
Mateo Paz Soldán Monument	Work of Ismael Pozo. The statue was first placed in the 28 de Julio Avenue without any inauguration. It was reubicated to its current ubication in the park in 1982.	
Alexander von Humboldt Monument	Donated by the german colony in 1936 for the 400th anniversary of Lima.	
Víctor Larco Herrera Monument	Inaugurated in 1963.	
Elisa Rodríguez Parra Monument	Conmemorates the suffragist Elisa Rodríguez Parra. It was inaugurated in 1968. In a point between 2003 or 2006, the sculpture was stolen, it was replaced in 2006.	
Bust of Tomás Herrera	Donated by the Panamanian government for the 150th anniversary of the battles of Junín and Ayacucho.	
Inca Garcilaso de la Vega Monument	Sculpted by Máximo Tuni-Garcilaso Quispe, conmemorates the peruvian chronicler Inca Garcilaso de la Vega. Inaugurated in 1974 for the 150th anniversary of the peruvian independence.	
Diego Mexia Monument	Inaugurated in 1984.	
Antonio Raimondi half-body statue	Placed between 2010 and 2012. It follows the compostion of the Antonio Raimondi Monument in Plaza Italia.	
Bust of Fernando Belaúnde	The bust, a joint project between the Metropolitan Municipality of Lima and Saint Ignatius of Loyola University, was inaugurated in 2012, commemorating the 100th anniversary of the birth of Fernando Belaúnde, two-time president of Peru.	
Martin Luther sculpture	Inaugurated in 2017, conmemorating the 500th anniversary of the Protestant Reformation.	

== See also ==
- Palacio de la Exposición
