= Paseo Colón =

Avenue in Lima, Peru

9 December Avenue
- Paseo Colón
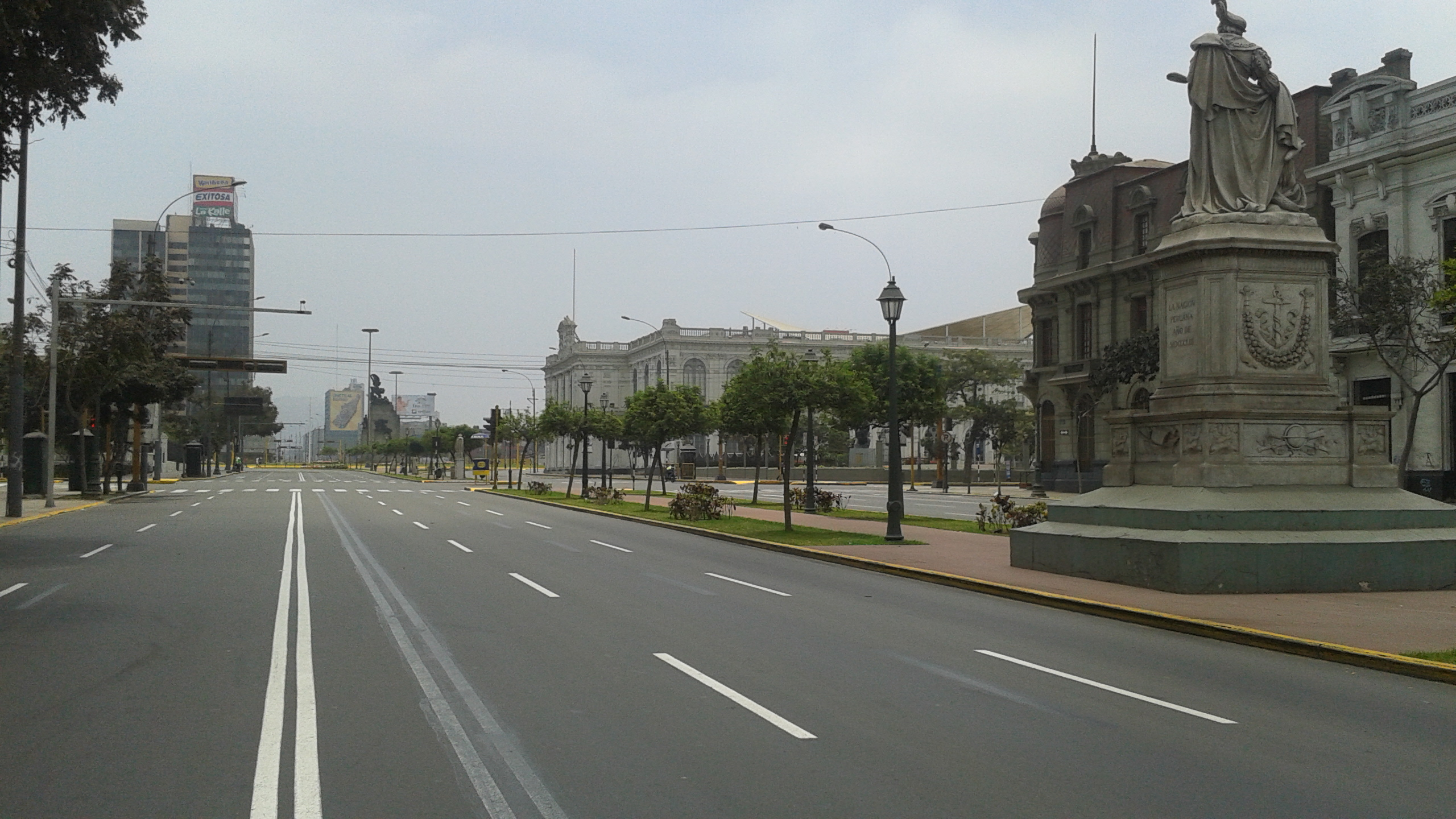
- Interactive map of 9 December Avenue
- Namesake: Battle of Ayacucho; Christopher Columbus (unofficial)
- From: Bolognesi Square
- Major junctions: Inca Garcilaso de la Vega Avenue, Jirón Washington, Paseo de la República Avenue
- To: Grau Square

9 December Avenue (Spanish: Avenida 9 de Diciembre), also known as Paseo Colón, is an avenue in the Historic Centre of Lima, Peru. The street is named after the statue of Christopher Columbus, one of thirteen statues located along its four blocks.

As of 2025, the avenue has been partially closed due to the ongoing underground construction works for Line 2 of the Lima and Callao Metro, which started in July 2024.

== History ==
The place where the Paseo Colón extends today constituted, during the viceregal era, the southern limit of the city where the Walls of Lima stood. In 1898, during the government of President Nicolás de Piérola, the avenue was drawn up with the name of 9 de Diciembre. It was later renamed Paseo Colón due to its pedestrian nature. From the moment it was laid out, Paseo Colón was considered an aristocratic avenue since it was located in the middle of the Parque de la Exposición. As proof of this, the buildings on the road still show their republican-style decorations. However, this road suffered a great deterioration during the eighties, currently it has undergone an efficient recovery.

The restoration of the city's statues, including those of the avenue, began in October 2020 following the approval of the citywide restoration plan proposed by PROLIMA, an agency of the Metropolitan Municipality of Lima. These works concluded in August of the following year.

Works related to the construction of Line 2 of the Lima and Callao Metro and its Central Station have been planned since 2016, with works starting in the following years. In 2024, the closure of the avenue and the removal of its statues was announced in order to carry out the construction of the station itself. These works began in July 2024 with the closure of its first block. One month later, the 19th-century remains of a fountain and water system were discovered. As of July 2025, construction of the station was reported to be almost 70% complete.

== Route ==
Its first block begins at Grau Square. To the north is Neptune Park, also named after Juana Alarco de Dammert, where the Centre for Military Historical Studies is located. Its southern side features the main façade of the Palace of the Exhibition, which houses the Lima Art Museum since 1957 and is surrounded by two entrances to the Park of the Exhibition. The central pathway between both buildings features two of four allegorical statues (representing Summer and Winter) by Francisco Pietrosanti, originally located at the Plaza Mayor. Some large vases, which feature throughout the avenue, can also be seen.

The second block features two buildings by Claude Sahut: the Casa Molina (1912) and the Casa Menchaca (1920). Another building, the Casa Wiese, also dates back to 1920, but with a design by Ricardo de Jaxa Malachowski. A building on the opposite side serves as a local branch of Acción Popular, a political party. The statue of Christopher Columbus, after which the avenue is unofficially named, is located in the central part of this block.

The third block features the latter two allegorical statues, dedicated to Spring and Autumn, as well as monumental buildings, such as the Casa Sal y Rosas and the Quinta Alania. The fourth and final block ends at Bolognesi Square.

== Transport ==
The street is set to be serviced by the Central Station of the Lima and Callao Metro, whose construction works, along with the work for Line 2, started in July 2024.

== See also ==
- Historic Centre of Lima
