= Pedro Ruiz Gallo =

Peruvian colonel and inventor

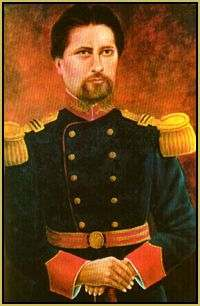
- Oil painting in the Aeronautical Museum of Peru
- Born: June 24, 1838; Etén, Chiclayo, Peru
- Died: April 24, 1880 (aged 41) Callao, Peru
- Service years: 1848–1880
- Known for: Several inventions, including the Great Clock of Lima
- Conflicts: Chincha Islands War; War of the Pacific

Pedro Ruiz Gallo (Etén, June 24, 1838 – Callao, April 24, 1880) was a Peruvian polymath, serving as a soldier and inventor, also working as a watchmaker, mechanic, musician, painter, researcher, doctor, and explorer, nationally considered one of the forerunners of modern aeronautics and patron of the Peruvian Army's engineering branch. He was the creator of the monumental clock that was located in the Parque de la Exposición, which was looted by Chilean troops during the War of the Pacific.

== Early life ==
He was born in the then Villa de Eten in 1838, his parents were the Spanish colonel Pedro Manuel Ruiz and Juliana Gallo, when he was still a very young boy he lost his father and shortly after when he was just 11 years old his mother, this situation forced him to leave his small hometown to go to the city of Chiclayo where he began working as a watchmaker's assistant, a hobby that would interest him for the rest of his life.

== Military career ==
Since his childhood Ruiz had felt attracted to mechanics but moved by his military vocation, he moved to Lima at the age of 15 to enlist in the army, entering in 1854. Due to his merits and recognized intelligence, he quickly rose in rank. the arms race being that in 1855 he already held the rank of captain serving as an assistant in the prefecture of the department of Amazonas, where he carried out many explorations and studies in the still unknown Peruvian jungle, even exploring the Pongo de Manseriche. He also mapped the course of the Marañón River and one of its tributaries, the Cahuapanas River. During this period he also dabbled in medicine, achieving the discovery of bovine fluid against smallpox with which he managed to create an efficient vaccine. During his stay in Chachapoyas he built a public clock that he donated to the main church of that city.

In 1865 he was promoted to major graduate and when the revolution of General Mariano Ignacio Prado began that same year, and which would later lead to the war against Spain, he joined the restorative army that marched to Lima and overthrew President Juan Antonio Pezet, to then fight in the combat of May 2 against the Spanish squadron; after this action he was promoted to lieutenant colonel.

== Great Clock of Lima ==
After the war ended with the withdrawal of the Spanish squadron from South American waters, Ruiz was able to dedicate himself entirely to his engineering projects, including his ambitious project of building a great clock for the Peruvian capital, which he achieved under the patronage of then-President José Balta who appointed him attached to the General Staff and financed his work, despite the opposition and criticism that his work received, the inventor continued serene and persevering, being that on December 6, 1870, a few days before celebrating a new anniversary of the Battle of Ayacucho and before the admiration in general, its monumental clock was inaugurated in the gardens of the Exhibition in front of the Palace of the same name.

The Pedro Ruiz Gallo clock was for many years one of the biggest attractions in Lima. Despite successfully completing his greatest work, the already famous inventor never abandoned his scientific studies, now turning to aeronautics, publishing in 1878 Estudios Generales sobre la Navegación Aérea y Resolución de este importante problema, a work in which he raised the construction of a flying machine moved by mechanical propulsion that would allow man to conquer the skies, imitating the way that birds fly. However, these studies would have to be cut short when on April 5, 1879, the Chilean government declared war on Peru, beginning the so-called War of the Pacific.

== Later life and death ==
In 1879, Pedro Ruiz Gallo returned to the arms race and after the loss of the Huáscar monitor in the naval combat of Angamos and obtained control of the sea by the Chilean squadron, he directed his efforts to the manufacture of torpedoes to be used against the blocking squad that had already appeared in front of Callao.

Thus, he died on April 24, 1880, when an explosion ended his life, caused due to an accident while working on an experimental torpedo in a workshop in the Ancón balneario, north of Callao.

His body was buried in the Baquíjano del Callao Cemetery, where it remained until April 24, 1940, when, during the government of Manuel Prado Ugarteche, it was ordered that it be transferred to the Crypt of the Heroes of the War of the Pacific, where it currently rests.
