= Great Clock of Lima =

Former clock and landmark in Lima, Peru

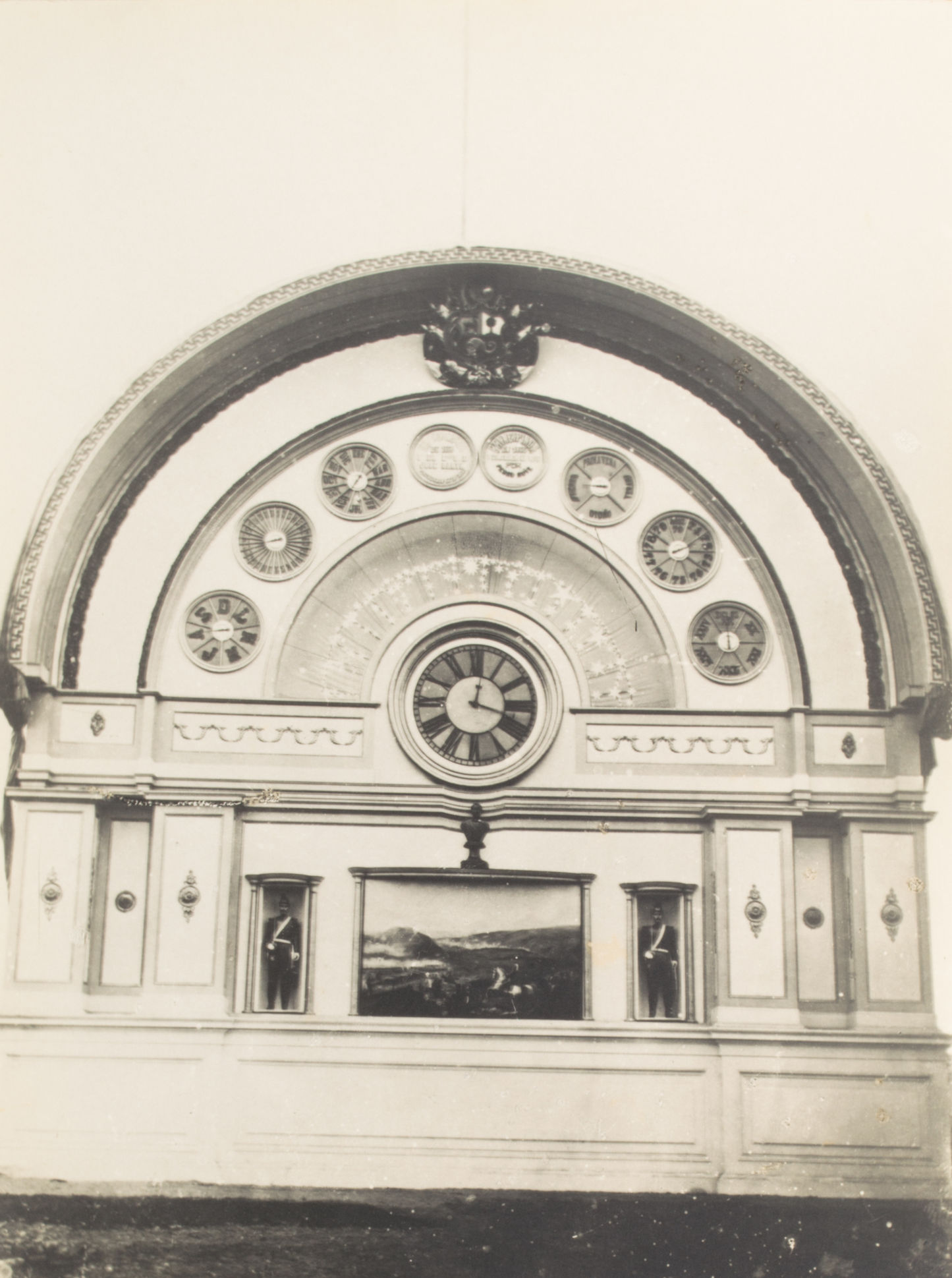
- 1872 photograph by Eugenio Courret
- Interactive map of Great Clock of Lima
- Location: Lima, Lima, Peru
- Coordinates: 12°03′51″S 77°02′18″W
- Designer: Pedro Ruiz Gallo
- Type: Clock
- Opening date: December 6, 1870

The Great Clock of Lima (Spanish: Gran Reloj de Lima), also known as the Pedro Ruiz Gallo clock (Spanish: Reloj de Pedro Ruiz Gallo) after its inventor, was a monumental clock created by Pedro Ruiz Gallo, and which was installed in the Parque de la Exposición in 1870 for the celebration of the Exhibition of 1872. The watch disappeared during the occupation of Lima by the Chilean Army in the War of the Pacific.

== History ==
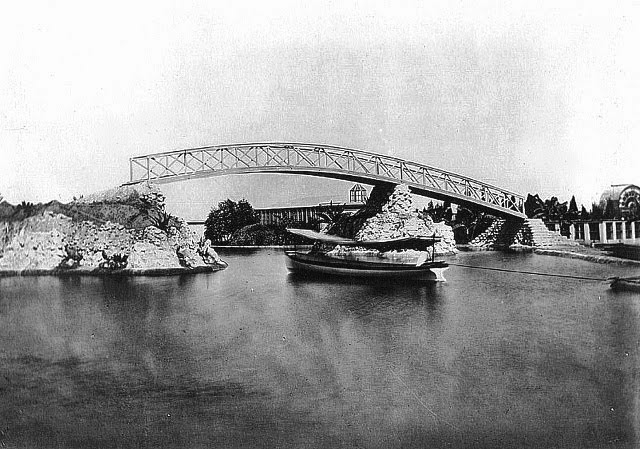
The clock (far right) in the park.

After the Spanish-South American War, colonel and inventor Pedro Ruiz Gallo was able to dedicate himself entirely to the ambitious project of building a great clock for the Peruvian capital, which he achieved under the patronage of then-President José Balta, who appointed him attached to the General Staff and financed his work. To carry out the mechanism, he obtained a budget of S/.31,000 from the Peruvian State, to which he added some S/.10,000 from his own pocket.

Despite the opposition and criticism that his work received, after 6 years of work he was able to inaugurate his mechanical work on December 6, 1870, at 00:00, a few days before the anniversary of the Battle of Ayacucho was celebrated, before the admiration of the public gathered in the gardens in front of the Palacio de la Exposición.

The clock was one of the main attractions of the International Exhibition of 1872 held in Lima, where various representative objects of the Andean country were exhibited, as well as machinery that indicated the Peruvian progress generated from the economic boom for the export of guano. It remained at the Palace of the Exhibition, which served as its location for ten years, until the War of the Pacific led to the occupation of Lima in 1881.

=== Theories about its destruction ===
The clock was exposed in the park for about 10 years. During the occupation of Lima by the Chilean Army, various facilities such as the Universidad Mayor de San Marcos, the National Library or the Palacio de la Exposición were used as barracks by the invading troops. One of the theories about the fate of the watch suggests that after being disassembled it was taken as war booty by order of Patricio Lynch, however once in Chile it could not be put into operation. According to Jorge Basadre, its inventor removed essential parts of the mechanism to render it useless so that the enemy could not rebuild it once it was transferred to Santiago de Chile.

Another theory suggests that the clock was not transferred to Chile, but that its machinery was destroyed by the victorious army and its structure used as a home for the officers of the troops stationed in the Parque de la Exposición. Once the troops withdrew, they reduced the invention to ashes.

== See also ==
- German Tower, Lima
