= Lima National Exhibition =

1872 Peruvian fair

Exposición Nacional
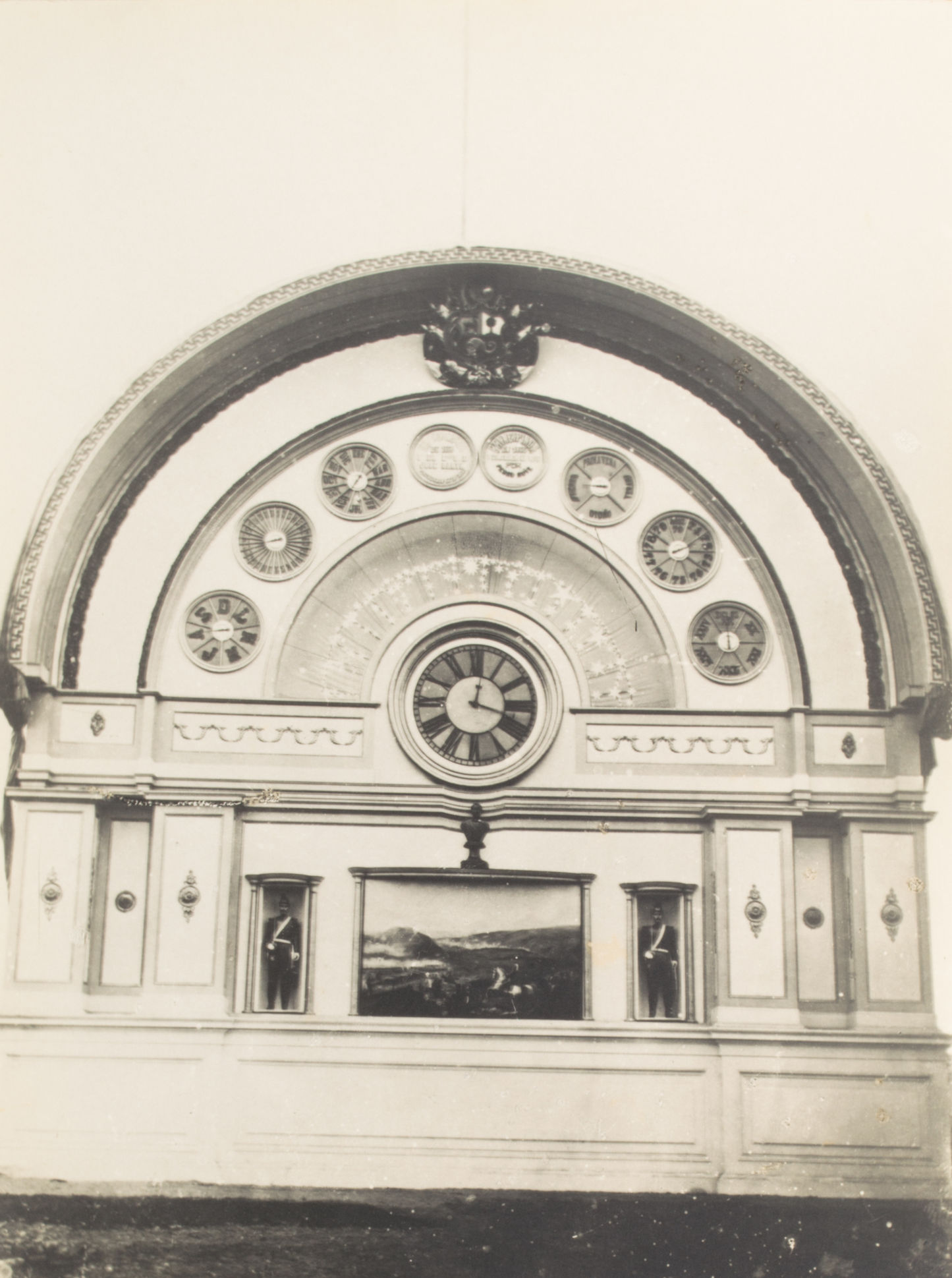
- Great Clock of Lima

Overview
- BIE-class: Unrecognized exposition
- Name: Exposición Nacional
- Building(s): Palacio de la Exposición
- Area: 50 acres (20 ha)
- Organized by: Manuel Atanasio Fuentes

Location
- Country: Peru
- City: Lima
- Venue: Park of the Exposition
- Coordinates: 12.0603°S 77.0370°W

Timeline
- Opening: 1 July 1872
- Closure: 1872

The Lima National Exhibition (Exposicion Nacional de 1872) was held in the Park of the Exposition, Lima, in 1872 to attract foreign investment, demonstrate Peru's progress and to mark fifty years since Peru's independence

== Background ==
The Peruvian president José Balta had ordered the demolition of the Walls of Lima in 1870 and the establishment of the Park of the Exposition to host the exhibition. The park was designed by Manuel Atanasio Fuentes and Antonio Leonardi and opened on 1 July 1872.

== Contents ==
During the fair there was a botanic garden, a Chinese pavilion and displays of modern machinery and of pre-Columbian art. And still remaining in the park in 2017 there are a Byzantine and Moroccan pavilion and a fountain of Neptune. There was also a Huaca, a Chinese pavilion, a dovecote, a lake with swans and a large clock. The clock, 'The great clock of Lima', designed by Pedro Ruiz Gallo was installed in a tower and as well as the time had six dials showing century date, year, month, week, day and phases of the moon, incorporated an organ and a 3x1 metre oblong to show a different historical picture every 25 hours.

The British firms Ransomes, Sims and Head (Ipswich) exhibited agricultural machinery, Ruston, Proctor and Company a road engine, Bailey and Company fire pumps and pyrometers and Barrow Hematite Steel Company showed steel and iron works.

== Gallery ==
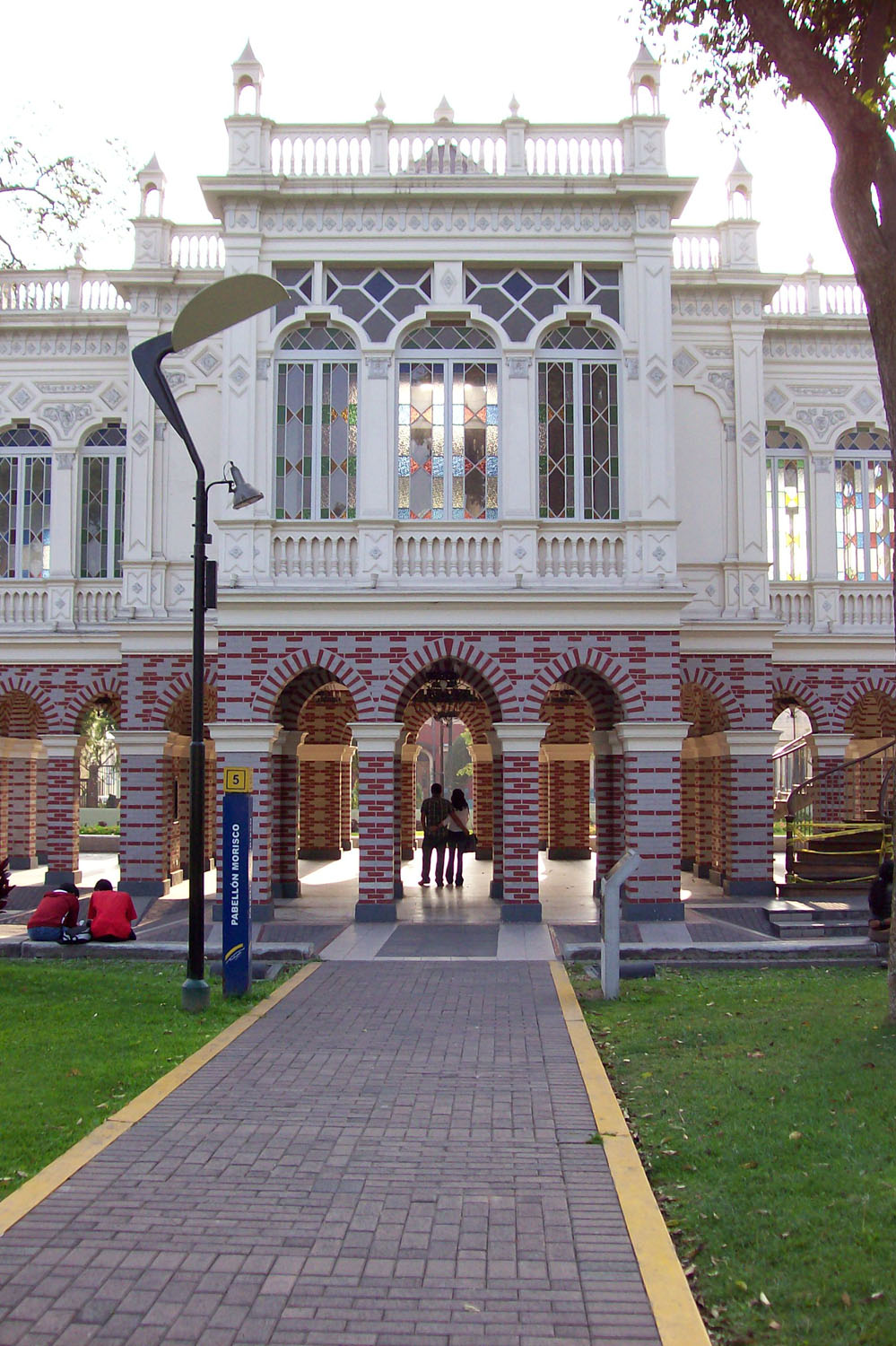
Moroccan pavilion

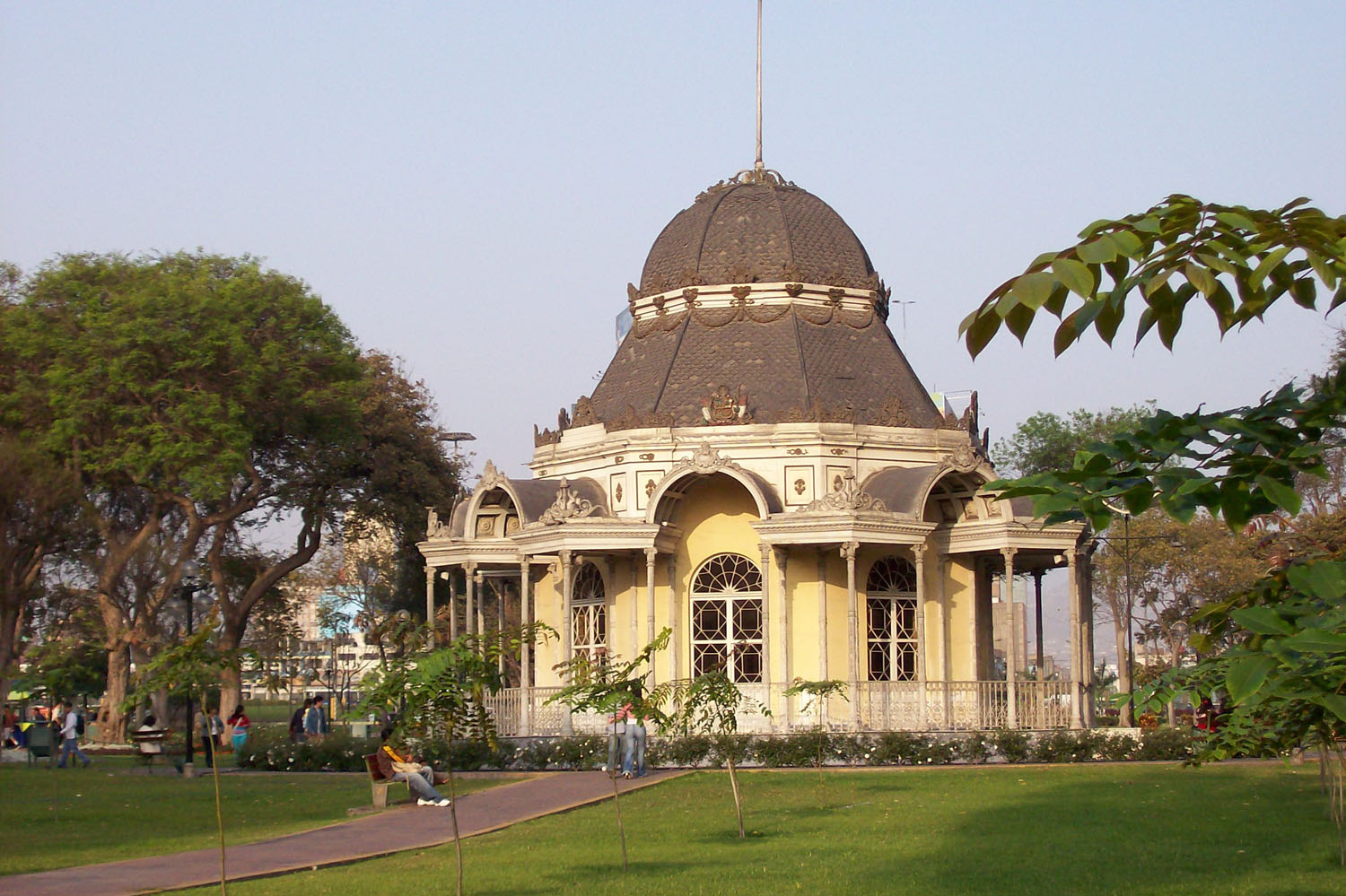
Byzantine pavilion

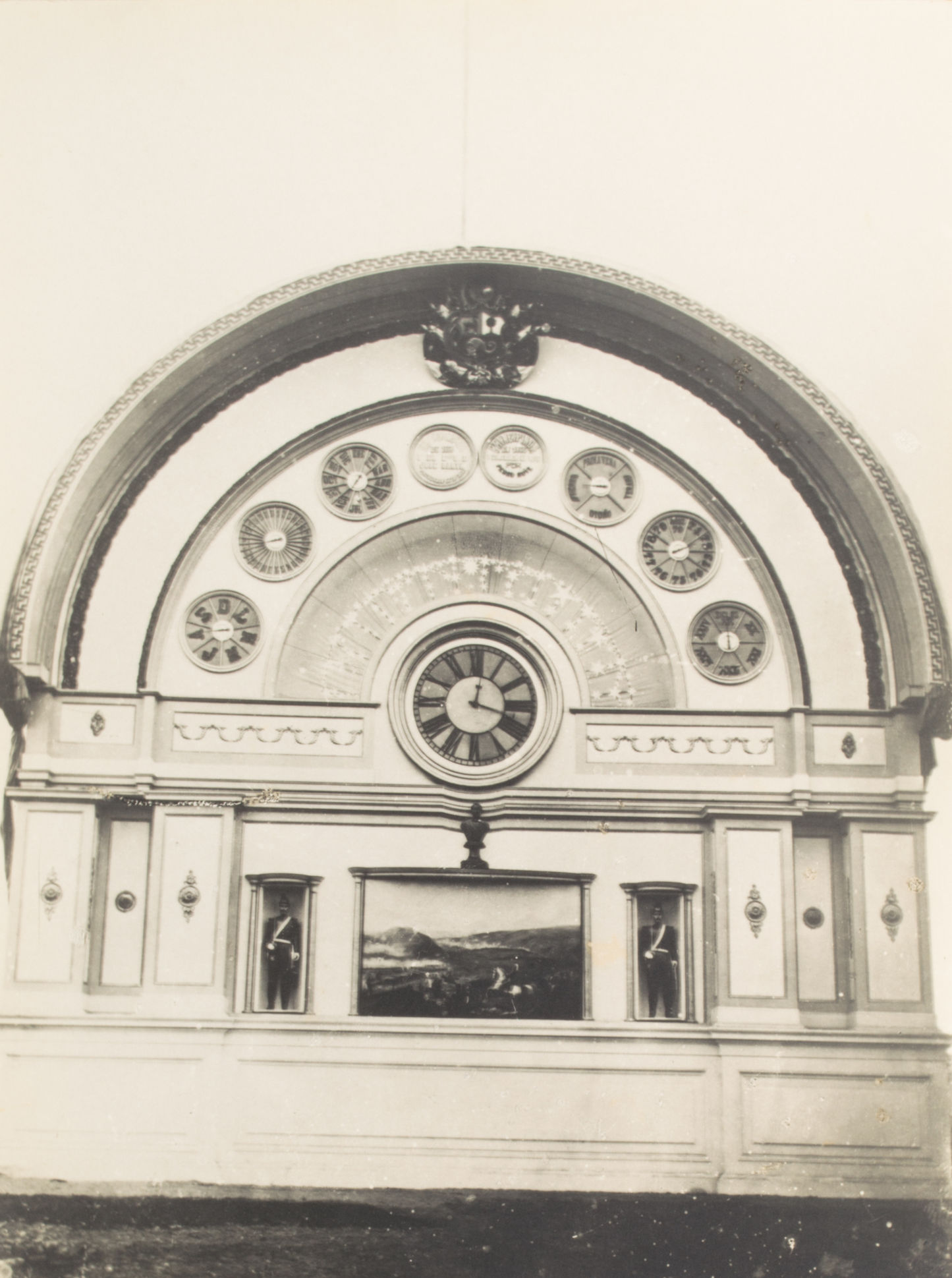
Great Clock of Lima (photographed by Eugenio Courret)
