= Statue of Christopher Columbus (Lima) =

Statue in Lima, Peru

Monument to Christopher Columbus
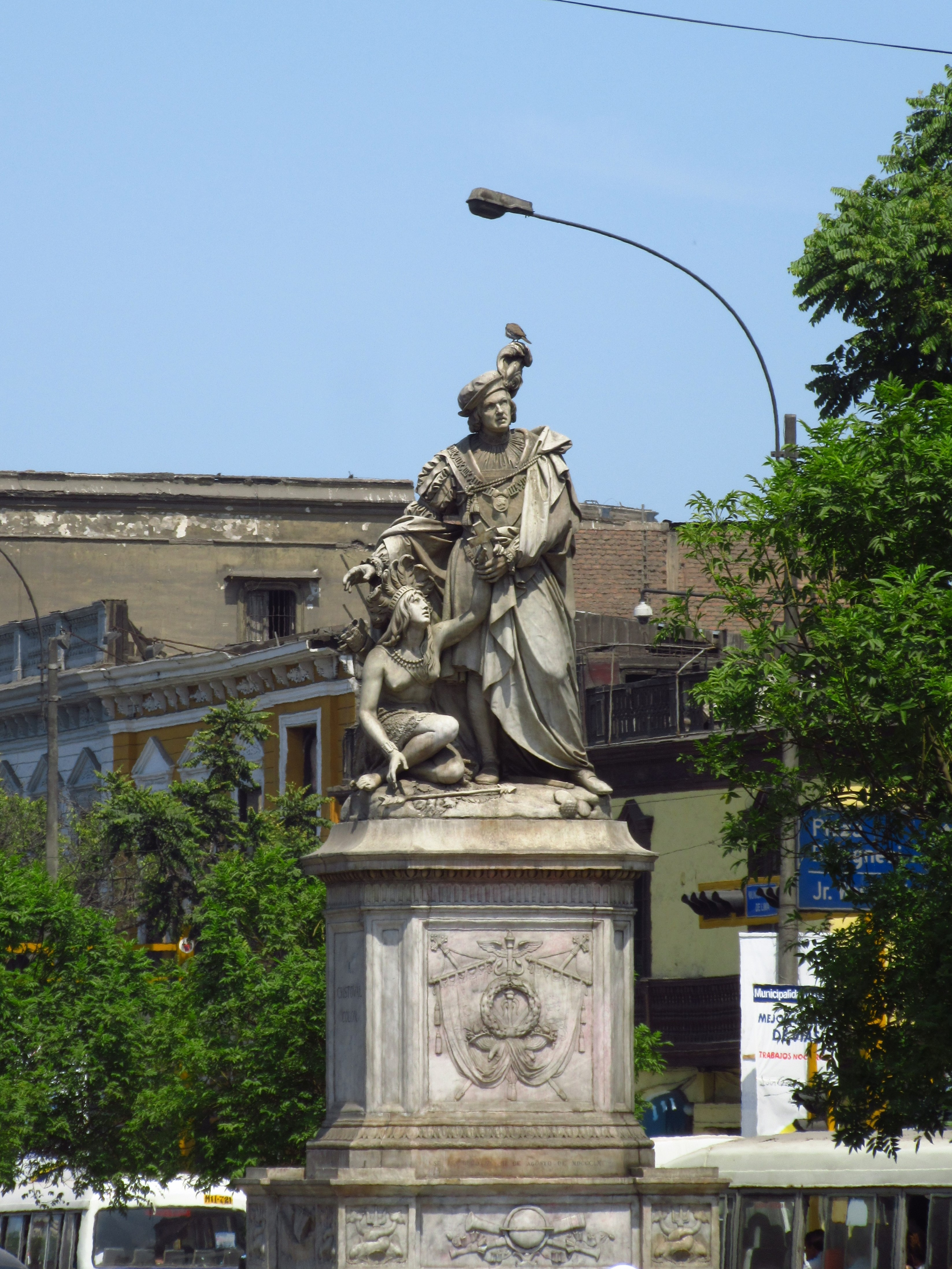
- Artist: Salvatore Revelli
- Completion date: 1860
- Medium: Sculpture
- Subject: Christopher Columbus
- Dimensions: 3 m (9.8 ft)
- Designation: Cultural heritage of Peru (Note: Part of Paseo Colón, which itself is part of the national protected area of Lima District, concurrent with the buffer zone of the area defined as the Historic Centre of Lima by UNESCO in 1988.)
- Location: Lima, Peru

The Monument to Christopher Columbus (Spanish: Monumento a Cristobal Colón) is a 10-feet-high statue by Salvatore Revelli dedicated to Christopher Columbus, located in the central pedestrian path of the second block of Paseo Colón, a street of the Historic Centre of Lima, Peru. Originally inaugurated in 1860 in what is now Rímac District, it was eventually moved to its current location in 1906.

As of 2026, the statues at the street's first two blocks, including that of Columbus, are currently located at the Park of the Exhibition since 2024 due to the ongoing underground construction works for Line 2 of the Lima and Callao Metro, which started in July of that year.

== History ==
The statue is the work of Italian artist Salvatore Revelli, and built with Carrara marble. It was originally located at the Alameda de Acho, (Note: A promenade by Viceroy Manuel de Amat y Junyent that existed near the bullring of the same name, also known as the Alameda Nueva to distinguish it from the Alameda Vieja. It was eventually paved over and the area where the statue used to be located now serves as the entrance to Balta Bridge.) where it was inaugurated on August 3, 1860, during a ceremony that featured the city's prefect, mayor, police intendant and Mariano Felipe Paz Soldán, the director of the city's penitentiary who was in charge of the statue's placement. Also present was president Ramón Castilla.

Due to the chaos then rampant in the area north of the Rímac River, the statue was damaged and plundered several times. Additionally, the construction of Balta Bridge meant the end of the oval park where it was located, which led to its move to the middle of the Plazuela de la Exposición in 1873 (in what is now Grau Square. Prior to this move, the statue's relocation to the squares of Saint Anne or Saint Francis was also considered, but not carried out due to different obstacles. During its period at the Exhibition Square, an ultimately unsuccessful proposal arose to replace the Statue of Neptune at the park of the same name that was plundered by the Chilean Army during the military occupation of the city.

It was ultimately moved to its current location, the centre of the newly formed Paseo Colón (near its intersection with Inca Garcilaso de la Vega Avenue), also named after the navigator, in 1901. It was vandalised in 2016, and eventually underwent renovation efforts by PROLIMA in 2020.

== See also ==
- List of monuments and memorials to Christopher Columbus
- Paseo Colón
