= Institute of Hygiene, Lima =

Building in Lima, Peru

Coordinates: 12.0594°S 77.0371°W

Institute of Hygiene
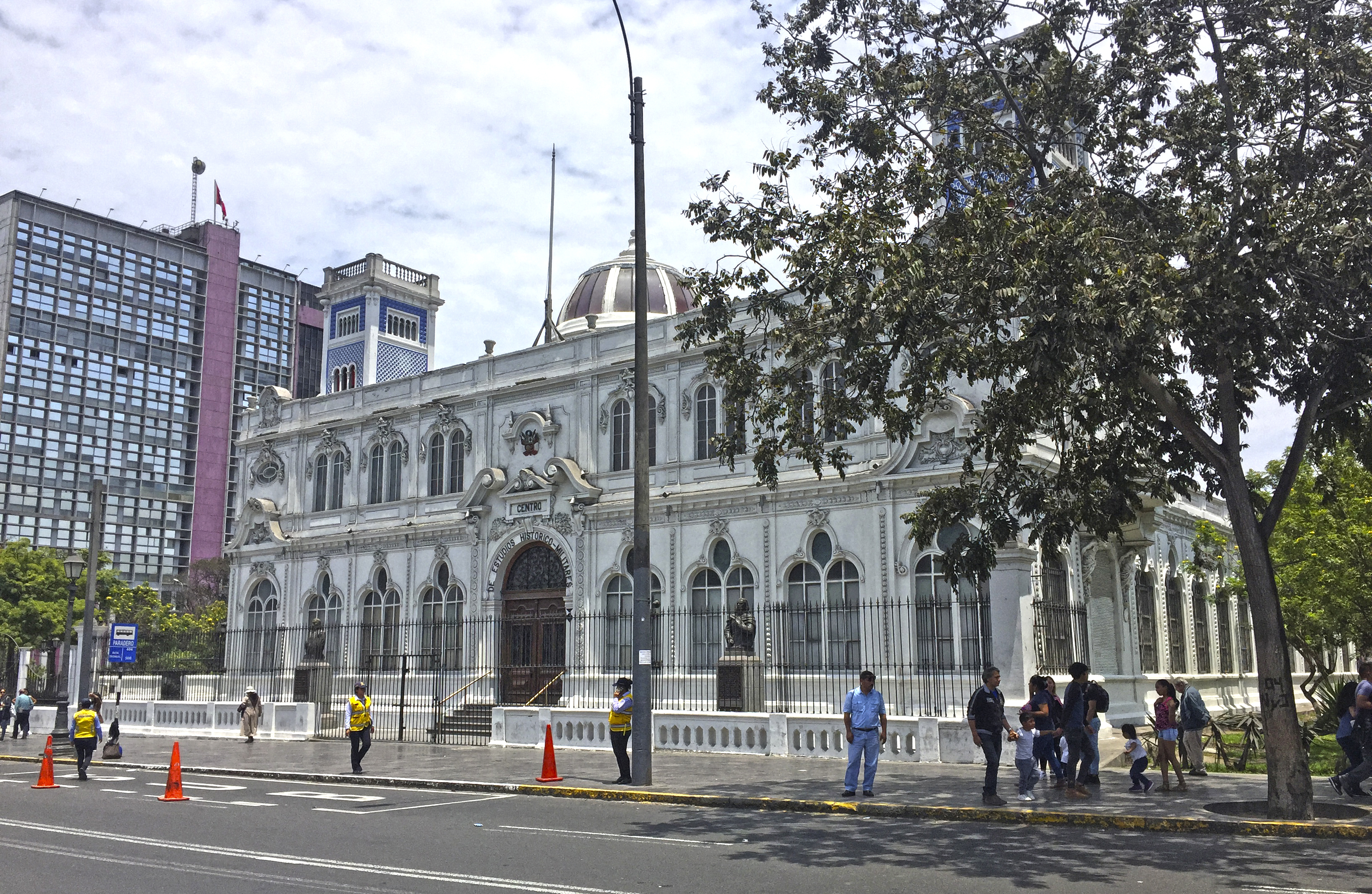

General information
- Address: Av. 9 de Diciembre 150
- Year(s) built: 1903
- Inaugurated: 1903

Technical details
- Floor area: 750 m^{2}

Design and construction
- Architect(s): Ferdinand Gaillard

Website
- cehmp.org.pe

The Institute of Hygiene (Spanish: Instituto Municipal de Higiene) is a building located at the Paseo Colón of Lima, Peru. Located next to the Park of the Exhibition, its design was inspired by the pavilion built by Peru for the 1900 Paris Exhibition, and currently houses the Centre for Military Historical Studies (Spanish: Centro de Estudios Histórico Militares del Perú, CEHMP).

== History ==
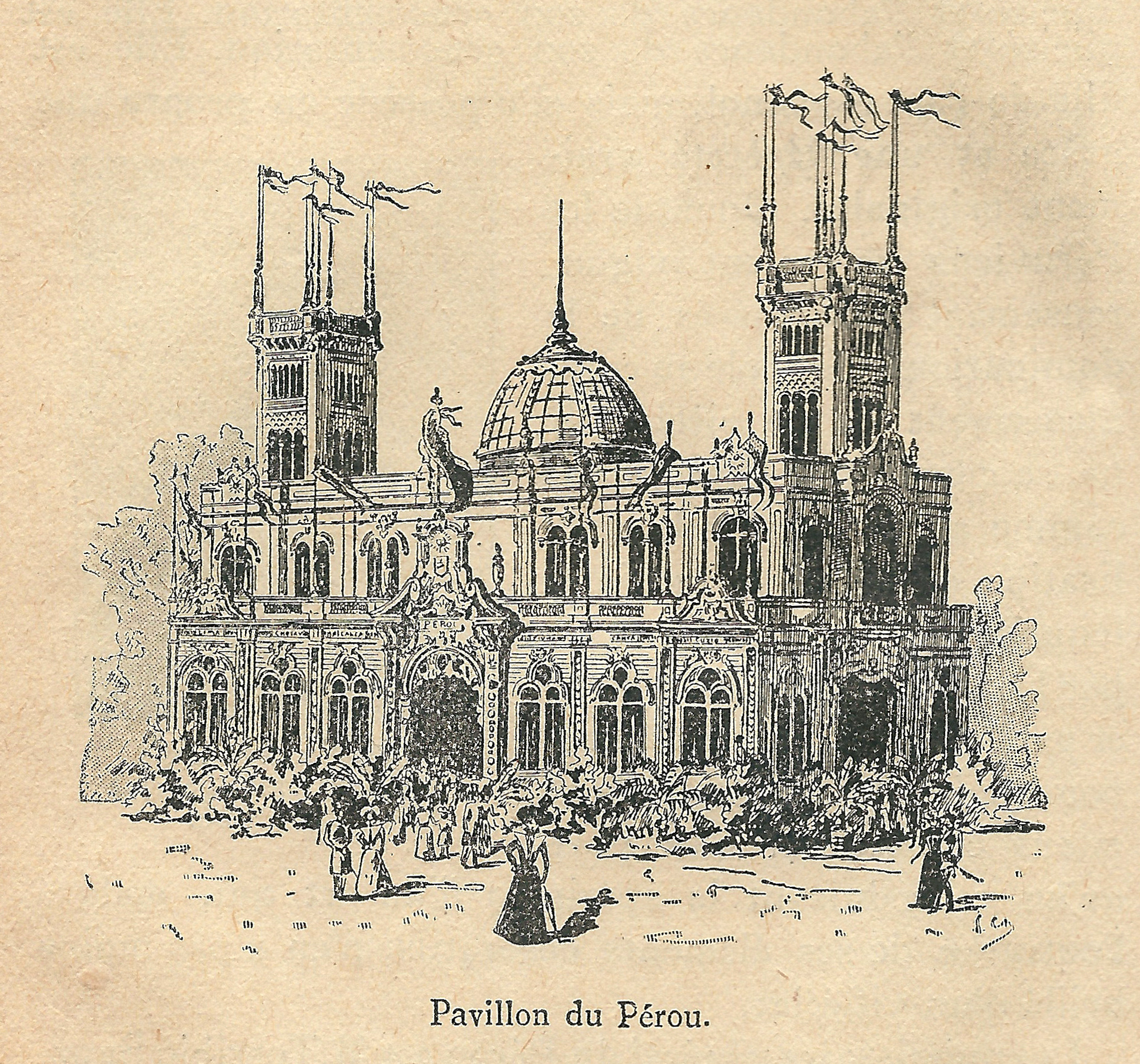
Illustration of the original building.

The building is based on the pavilion designed by Ferdinand Gaillard on the orders of Eduardo López de la Romaña for the 1900 Paris Exhibition, which was disassembled after the event concluded and shipped back to Peru. The transport efforts were supervised by then diplomat Pedro Paulet, and the fact that the pieces were returned to Peru has led to the popular belief that the building was reassembled in Lima, although this is not the case, as they were first abandoned at the Paseo Colón.

In 1903, the Metropolitan Municipality of Lima decided on the construction of a building to house the Institute of Hygiene at the city's Parque Colón, which already housed its chemical and bacteriological laboratories, in order to unify them into a single space. As the disassembled building arrived from Paris, the project was modified to adapt to the gifted materials and reproduce the original building's structure as best as possible, as the new building was two-thirds larger than the former pavilion. Additionally, most of the iron had been exposed to the seaside weather of Callao, and had thus corroded.

The building was inaugurated on the same year of its construction, and subsequently functioned as a police station from the 1930s to 1940s. In 1949, it served as the 30th Traffic Command and in 1962, it was ceded to the Centre for Military Historical Studies. The centre's collection includes items of the history of Peru after independence.

== See also ==
- Peruvian pavilion, Seville
