= Museum of Italian Art =

Museum in Lima, Peru

Coordinates: 12.05846°S 77.0368°W

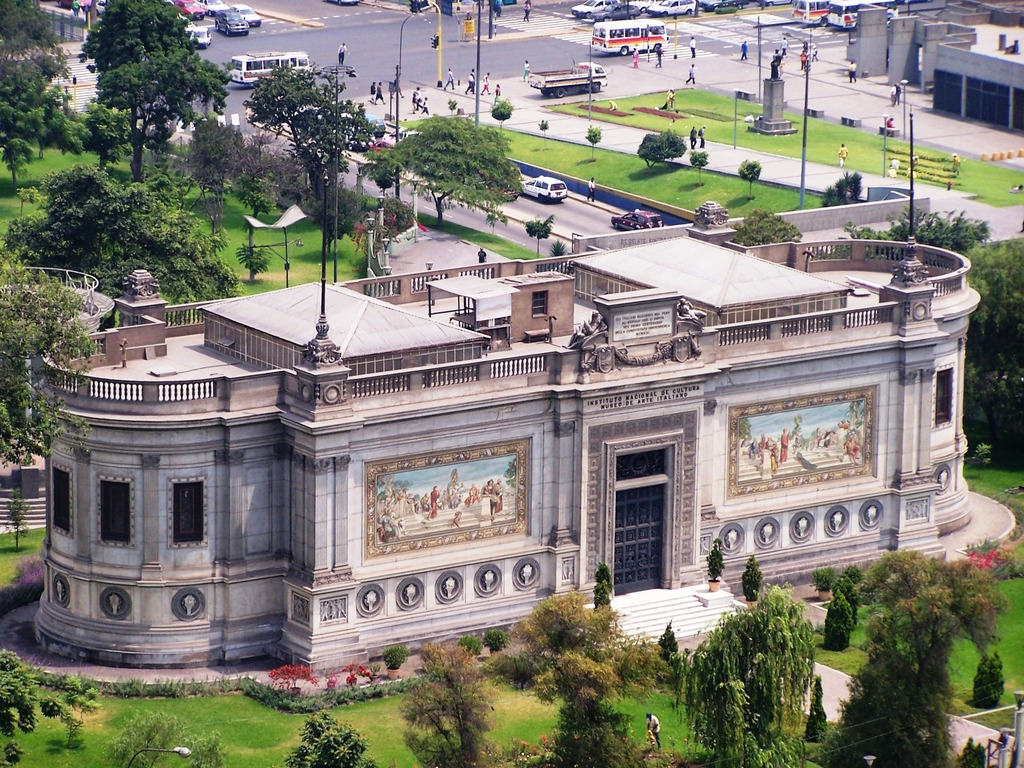

The Museum of Italian Art (Spanish: Museo de Arte italiano) is a public museum in Lima, Peru. It is the only European arts museum in Lima. Openened in 1923, it is now managed by the Peruvian Ministry of Culture.

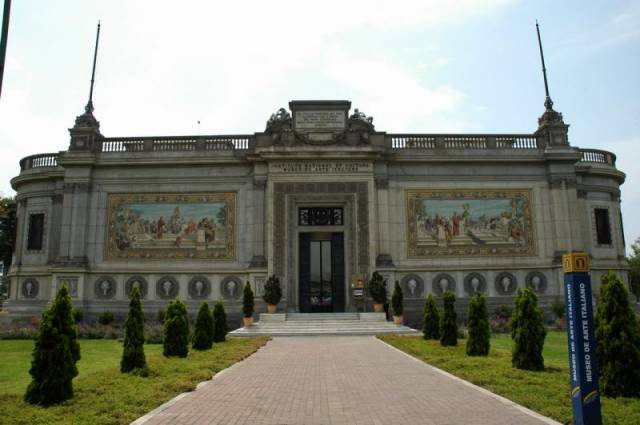
Front view of the museum.

== History ==
The Museum of Italian Art was the gift from the Italian community in Peru, for the 100th Anniversary of the Independence of Peru in 1921. The project for the museum building was given to the Italian architect Gaetano Moretti, who also designed The Chinese Fount, a gift from the Chinese community for the independence celebration. Its official inauguration occurred on November 11, 1923. The building has remained open since its inauguration.

In 1972, the museum came under the management of the National Institute of Culture. The institution received donations from contemporary Italian artists, and the permanent collection was expanded with another 35 artworks in 1989 and 1990. Since 1991, major efforts have been made to recover and revalue both the museum building and collection; work which has been supported by the Italian embassy and the Association of Friends of the Museum of Italian Art.

Association of friends of the Museum of Italian Art was created in 1991, under the initiative of the Italian Ambassador in Peru. Its principal purpose is to promote all the activities that help to preserve, renew, revive and stimulate the museum's life.

== Building ==
The museum is located on the second block of Paseo de la República, an avenue in the Historic Centre of Lima. It has six rooms for the exhibition of its permanent collection and temporary exhibitions. One room contains a large stained glass inspired by Botticelli's Primavera. The grounds incorporate a large courtyard and parking lots.

Ancient Italian art is represented in design and decorative elements throughout the building. These include elements of the architecture of Bramante, and reliefs and decorative details inspired by Donatello, Ghiberti, Michelangelo and Botticelli. The façade displays the emblems of the principal Italian cities and two Venetian mosaics depicting famous Italian historic figures.

== Permanent collection ==
Mario Vannini Parenti was responsible for the first artworks to belong to the museum's permanent collection. He acquired a collection of more than 200 original works, including sculptures, paintings, drawings, prints and ceramics. The collection represents all Italian regions. Most of the collection dates from the beginning of the 20th Century, although the avant-garde movement is not represented.

== Services ==
=== Library and catalogue ===
The museum has an important library, with information, audiovisual material, and books about Italian artists and about the museum and collection. The museum catalogue, with more than 300 pages, provides detailed information about the 313 art works in the permanent collection, as well as the biographies of the Italian artists which art works are exhibited there.

=== Guided visits for blind people ===
The museum has offered guided visits for blind people since 1998, as part of the museum's goal to make art and culture accessible for all. Using special gloves, blind visitors can touch the collection of bronze and marble sculptures, which is forbidden to the general public.

== Temporary exhibitions ==
The museum, besides having one of the most important collections in Peru, has also held several important temporary exhibitions, like "Giotto en Padua", in 2004, that included the official replica of the Scrovegni Chapel, that had toured other European and South American countries before. And Del mito al sueño. Rodin... Dalí, in 2008 and 2009, that included 30 sculptors that belong to Museo Soumaya in Mexico City, from six European masters: Auguste Rodin, Salvador Dalí, Edgar Degas, Emile-Antoine Bourdelle, Pierre-Auguste Renoir and Giorgio de Chirico.

The temporary exhibition entitled "A collection" opened in May, 2010. It exhibited the private collection of the Italian ambassador in Lima, Francesco Rausi. The exhibition included avant-garde Russian art, work of the Peruvian artist Fernando de Szyszlo, and the contemporary plastic expressions by artists from Italy, Brazil, Canada, Korea, and the United States.
