= Lima Art Museum =

Art museum in Lima, Peru

- Museo de Arte de Lima

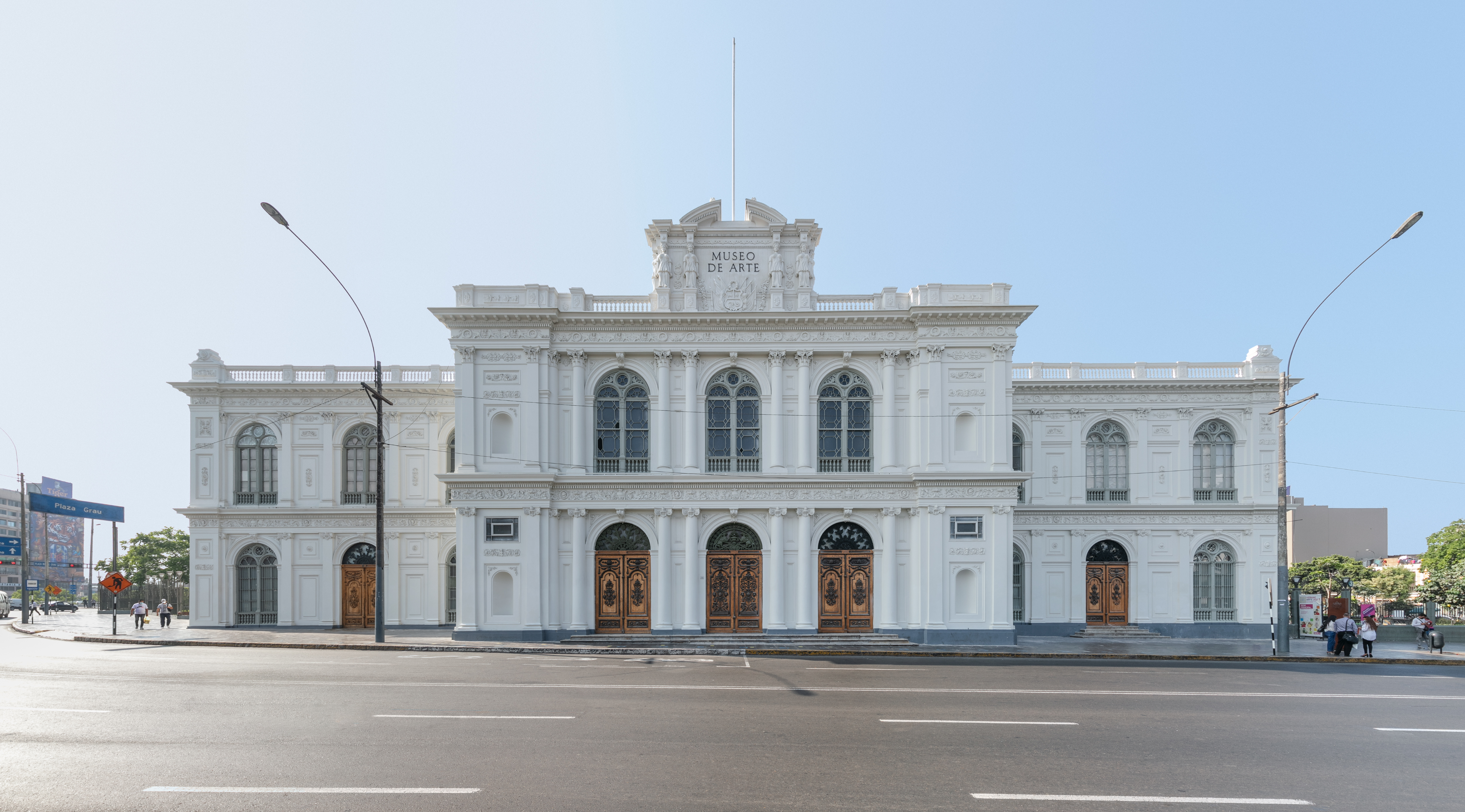
- Entrance of the museum
- Interactive fullscreen map
- Established: 1961
- Location: Lima, Peru
- Coordinates: 12°03′38″S 77°02′13″W
- Type: Museum of art
- Website: mali.pe

The Lima Art Museum (Museo de Arte de Lima, MALI) is an art museum in Lima, Peru. The museum is located in the Palacio de la Exposición. The museum was inaugurated in 1961. The collection includes ceramics, textiles, sculptures, and paintings spanning almost 3,000 years of history, from the pre-Columbian to Contemporary periods. MALI is a private organization supported by admission fees, contributions from members, and private donations.

In 2015, the museum opened its renovated galleries on the second floor of the Exhibition Palace, showcasing some of the collection's most important items. The museum's contemporary art collection, numbering more than 1,000 works, remains largely in storage pending the development of a new wing.

The museum has supported new research on Peruvian art history and houses one of the region's most extensive art archives. MALI runs an active program of temporary exhibitions throughout the year, featuring local and international artists. Past exhibitions have included Gordon Matta Clark, Milagros de la Torre, Martin Creed, Gerhard Richter, Wolfgang Tilmans, Martin Chambi, Annie and Josef Albers, Francis Alÿs, Fernando Bryce, Marcel Odenbach, Jorge Eduardo Eielson, among others. In 2018, the museum showed "El Perú ilustrado. Martínez Compañón y su legado", showing the watercolors of the Codex Martínez Compañón with later illustrated works on Peru, among them Antigüedades peruanas (1851).

== Selected collection highlights ==
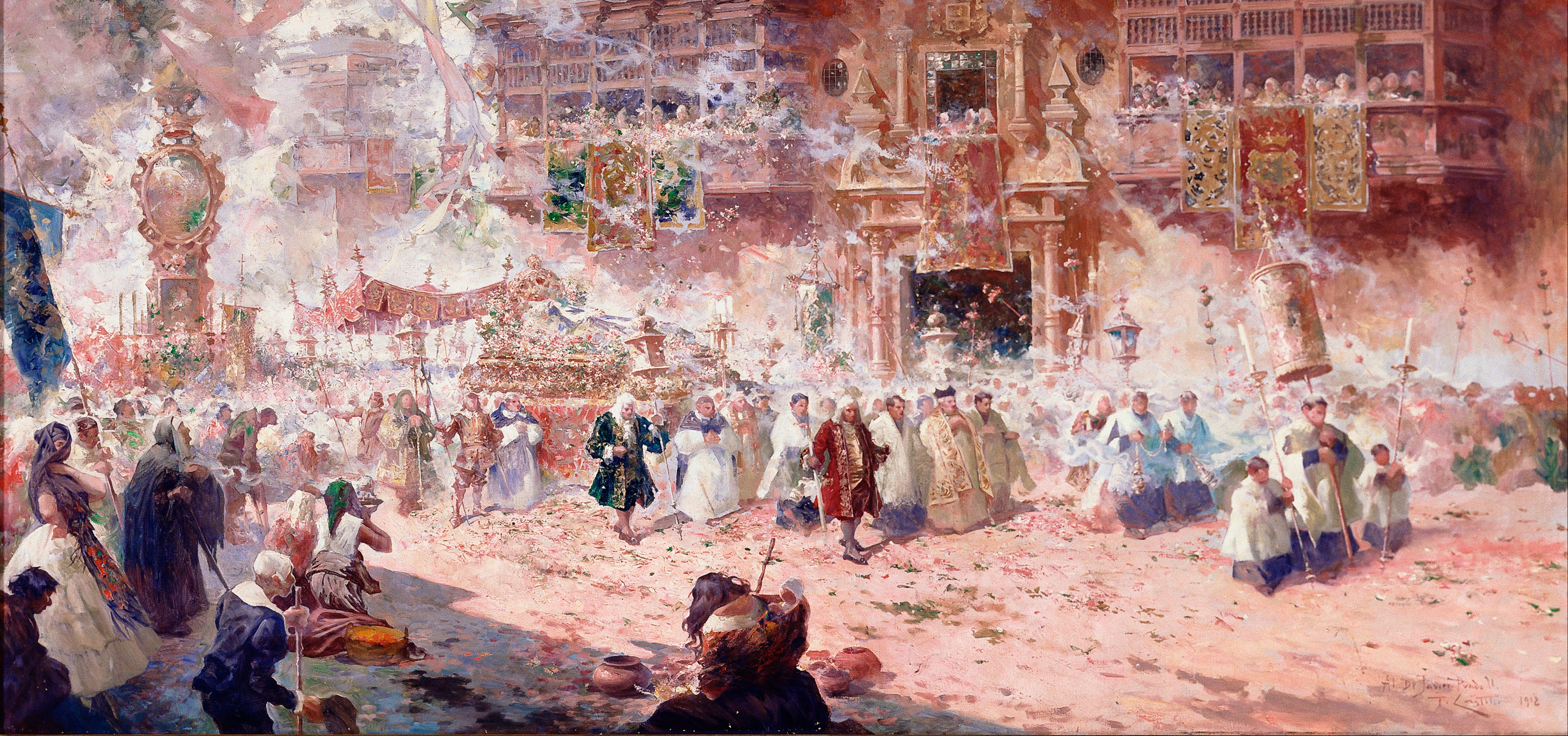
Teófilo Castillo

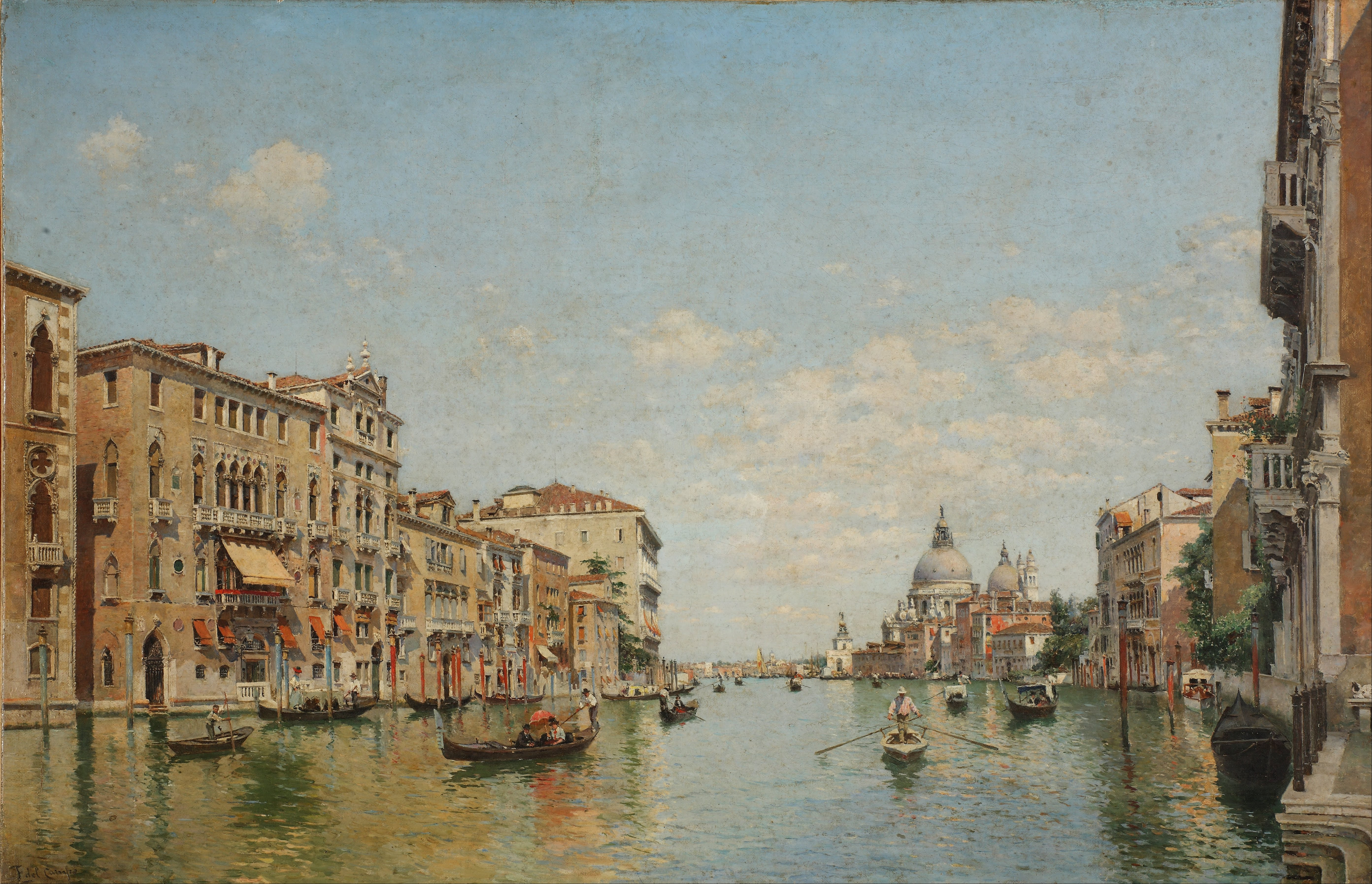
Federico del Campo

== History ==
The MALI is housed in the 1872 World's Fair Exhibition Palace in Exposition Park, at the entrance to Lima's historic center. Antonio Leonardi, an Italian architect living in Lima at the time, designed the Italianate façade that wraps the building's structure–a cast-iron system designed by Gustave Eiffel's atelier between 1870 and 1871. Leonardi, together with journalist Manuel Atanasio Fuentes, also designed the park, located on the former site of the Guadalupe Gate (one of ten gates along the city wall, torn down during the modernization campaigns of José Balta's presidency in 1868). Besides the Exhibition Palace, the park eventually housed numerous structures, including the Moorish and Byzantine pavilions (built in 1921 to commemorate Peru's centennial of independence).

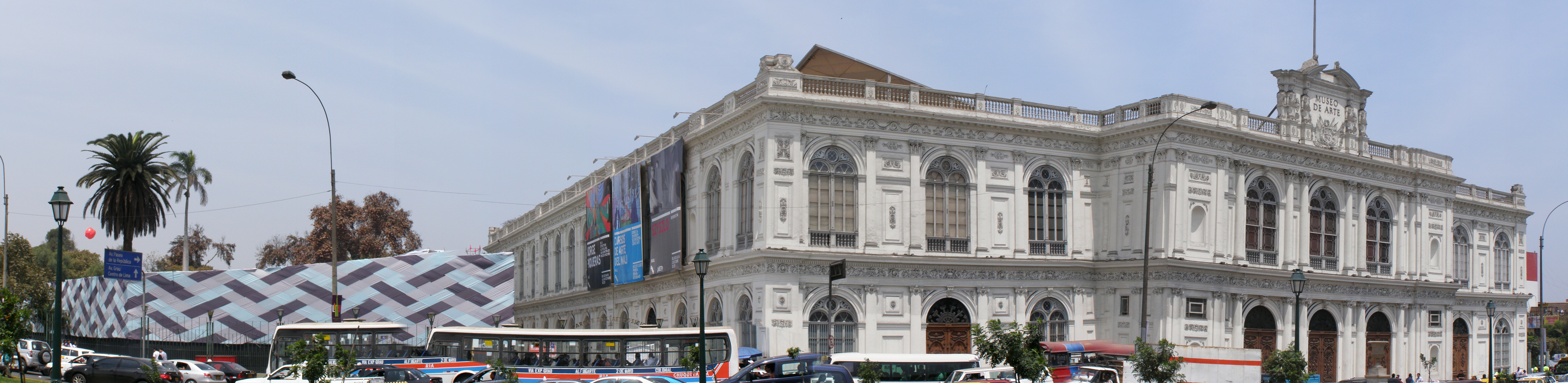
Lima Art Museum in 2011.

== Manuel Solari Swayne Library ==
Manuel Solari Swayne Library and the Peruvian Art Archive, part of MALI's documentation area, constitute the main art library in Peru.

== Digital archive ==
ARCHI, the Digital Archive of Peruvian Art, is a platform dedicated to documenting and sharing a range of Peruvian art expressions, material culture, and architecture in the most complete and representative way, contributing to their preservation and accessibility. ARCHI includes free educational resources to complement school teaching and learning processes.
