= Japanese gardens outside Japan =

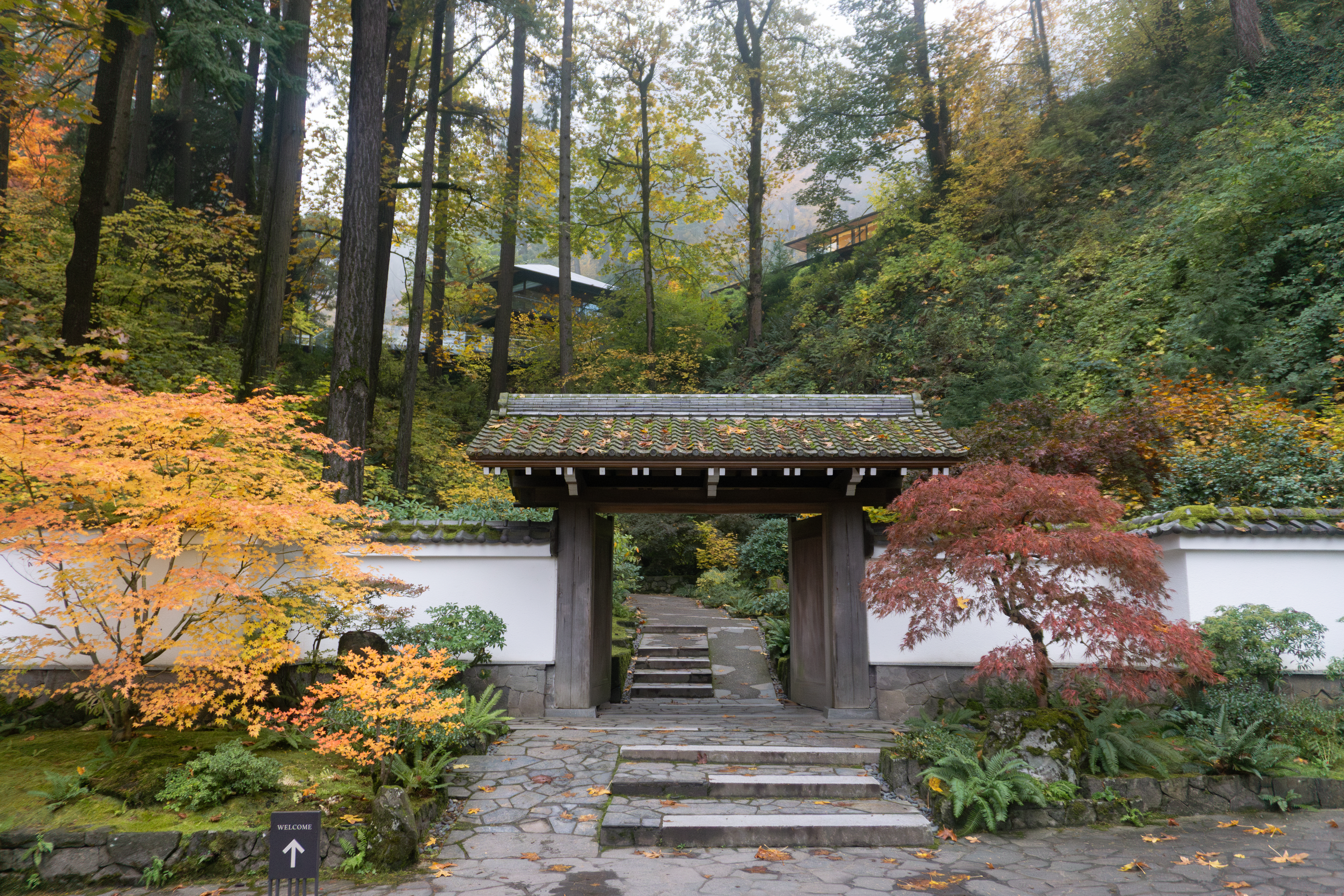
Portland Japanese Garden, said to be "the most scenic and authentic of the Japanese gardens overseas"

Japanese gardens outside Japan (日本国外の日本庭園, Nihon kokugai no Nihon teien) or overseas Japanese gardens (海外日本庭園, kaigai Nihon teien) are terms used to refer to the hundreds of Japanese-style gardens laid out around the world since the 1860s. They have been described by the Public Relations Office of the Government of Japan as "Japan's Green Ambassadors", with the Ministry of Foreign Affairs referring to related restoration projects as acts of "public diplomacy".

== Overview ==
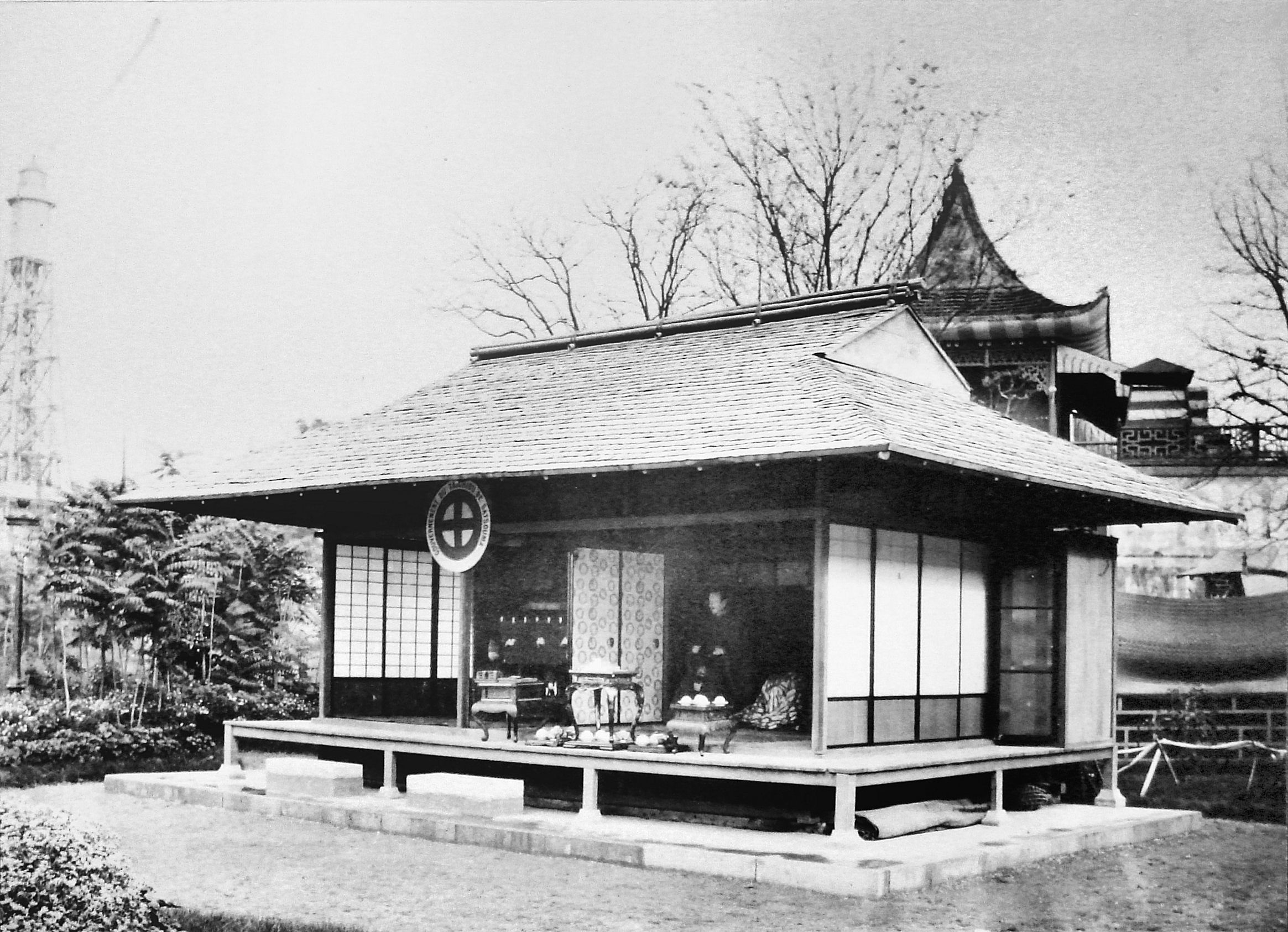
Satsuma Domain pavilion, Paris, 1867

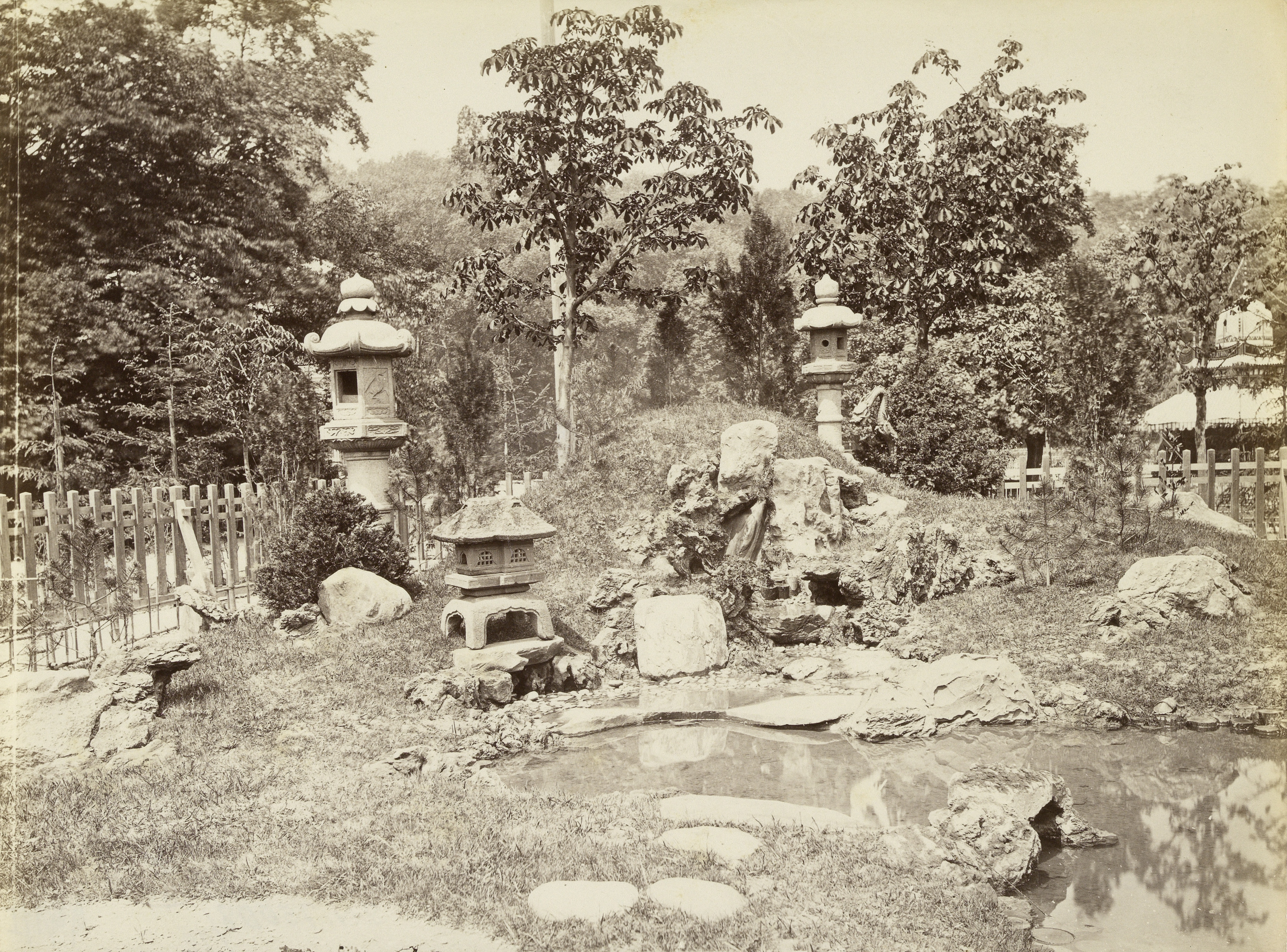
Japanese garden, Vienna, 1873

Although early Western visitors to Japan had encountered Japanese gardens since the sixteenth century, perhaps in part due to the subsequent "closed country" policy, the earliest Japanese garden outside Japan is thought to have been that accompanying the Japanese Pavilion at the 1867 Paris Exposition; the more elaborate example at the 1873 Vienna World's Fair is also sometimes said to have been the first. Seventeen 19th-century gardens and forty-seven pre-Second World War examples were still open to the public into the twenty-first century, while a 2006 study backed by the Japanese Institute of Landscape Architecture [Wikidata] documented some 432 gardens worldwide. As of 2026, the Center for International Japanese Garden Studies at Tokyo University of Agriculture has identified at least 632 gardens, with Japanese gardens to be found in over one hundred countries, in biomes with such diverse environmental conditions as those of Finland and Iraq. Recognizing in some cases a lack of the necessary garden maintenance and the need for garden restoration, from FY2017 to FY2021 the Ministry of Land, Infrastructure, Transport and Tourism provided financial and technical support through the Overseas Japanese Garden Restoration Project [Wikidata], with related initiatives continuing in subsequent years.

Motivations and purposes for the laying out of Japanese gardens include the promotion of Japanese culture and commerce, as at the initial world's fairs, for cultural exchange, as war memorials, in Japanese embassies, in museums relating to Japanese culture, as "sister city" friendship gardens, and as lieux de mémoire for members of the Japanese diaspora.

== Gallery ==
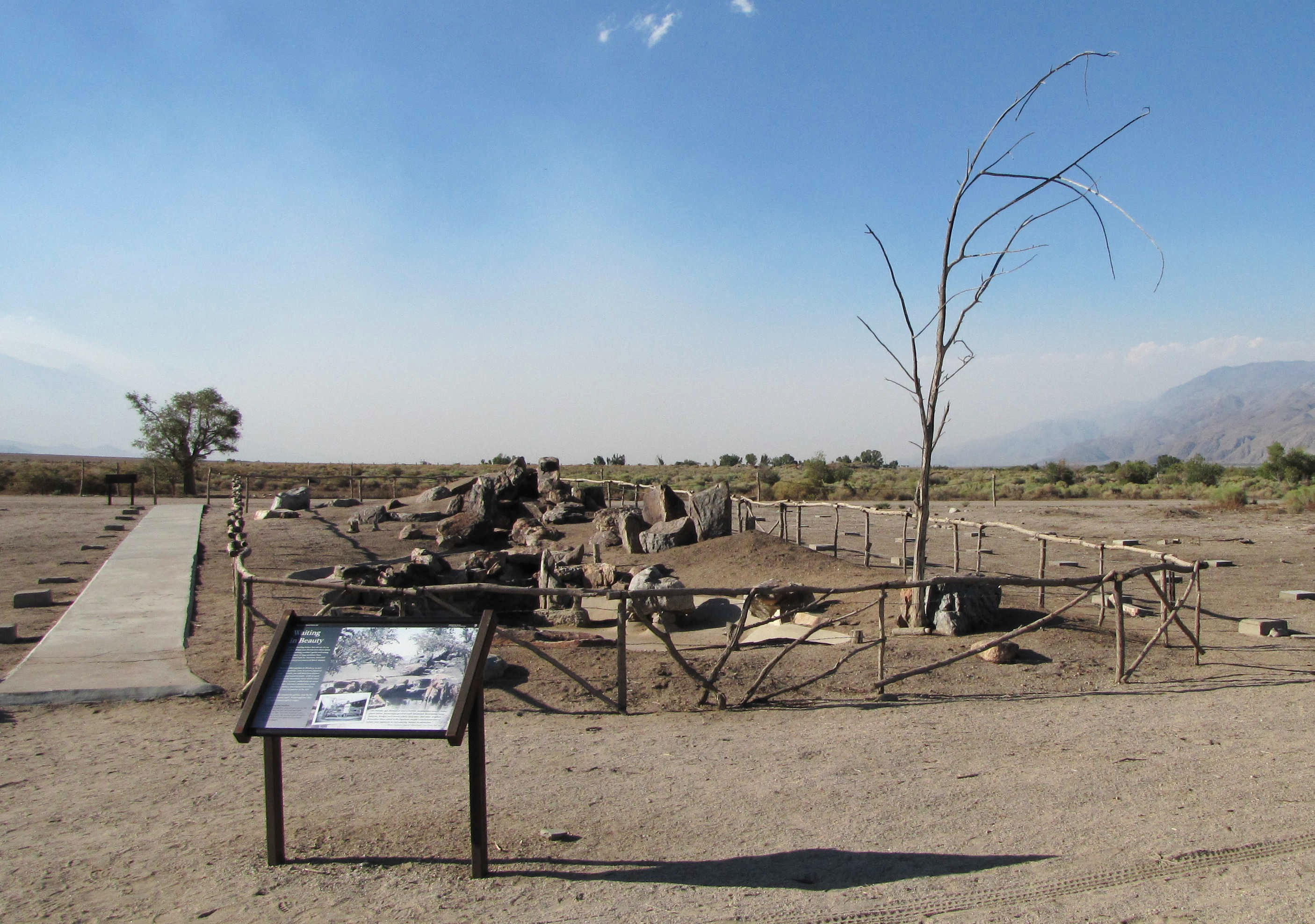
Manzanar Internment Camp, California

Harbin-Niigata Friendship Garden

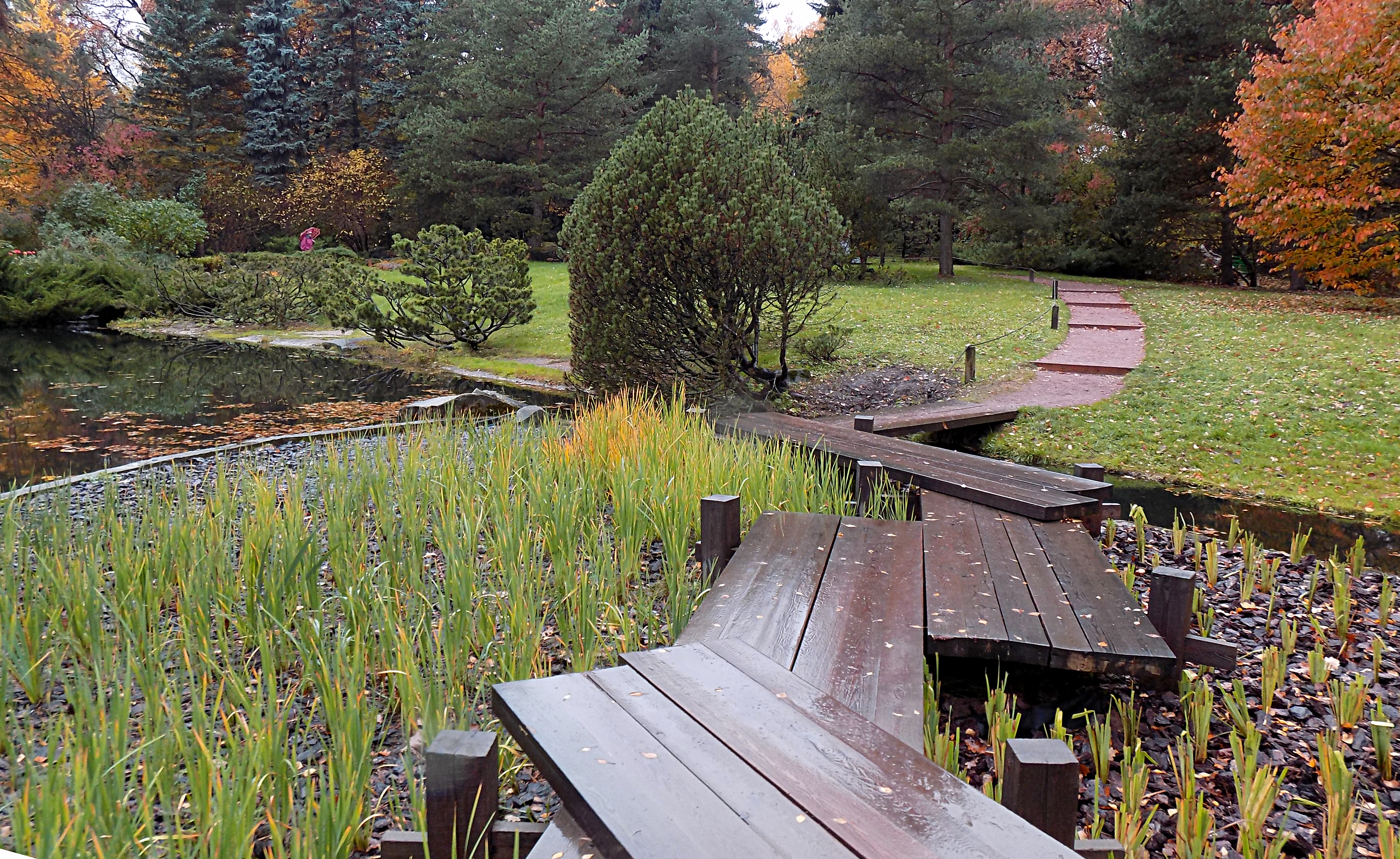
Japanese Garden, Moscow

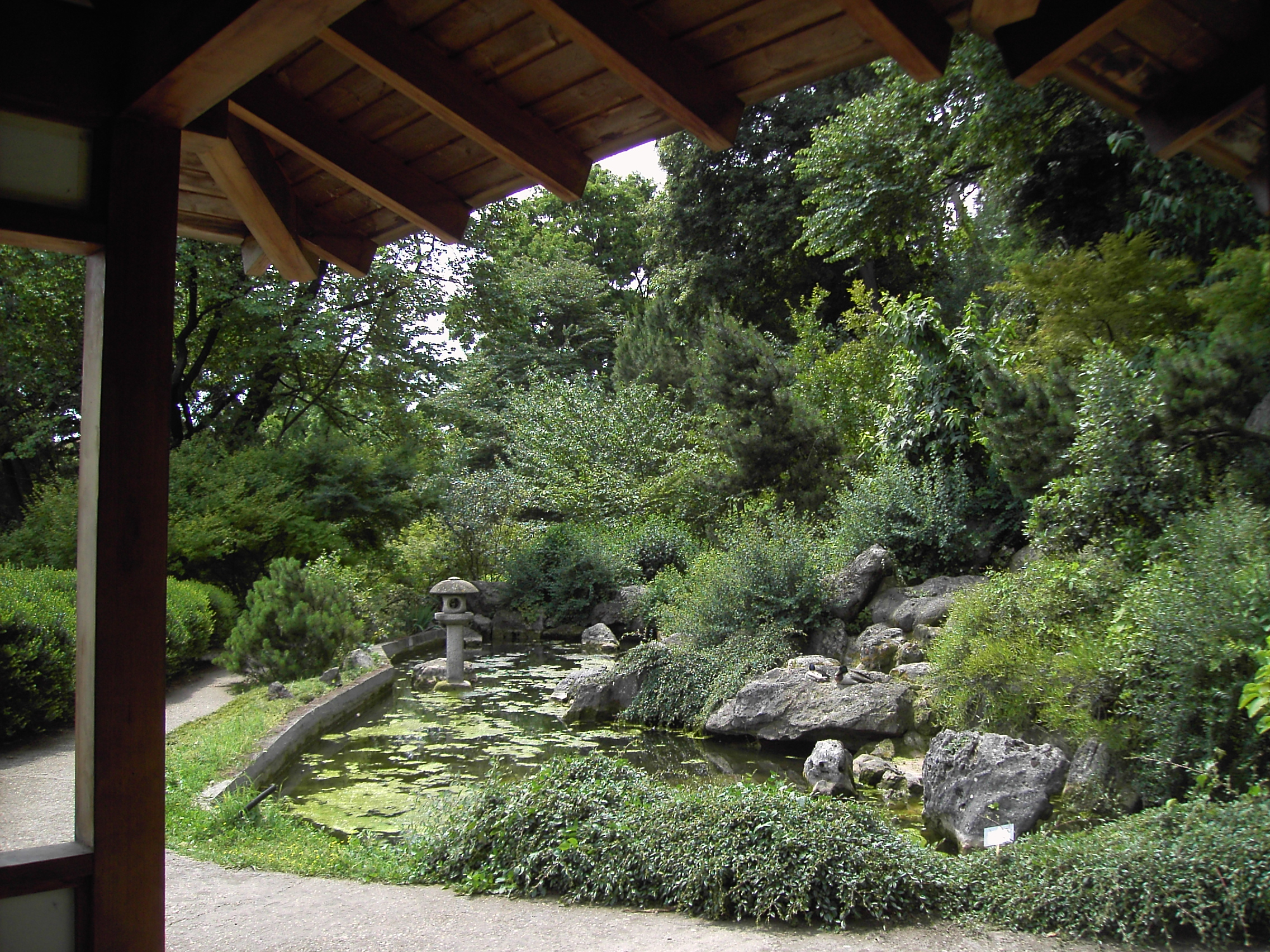
Japanese garden, Orto Botanico di Roma

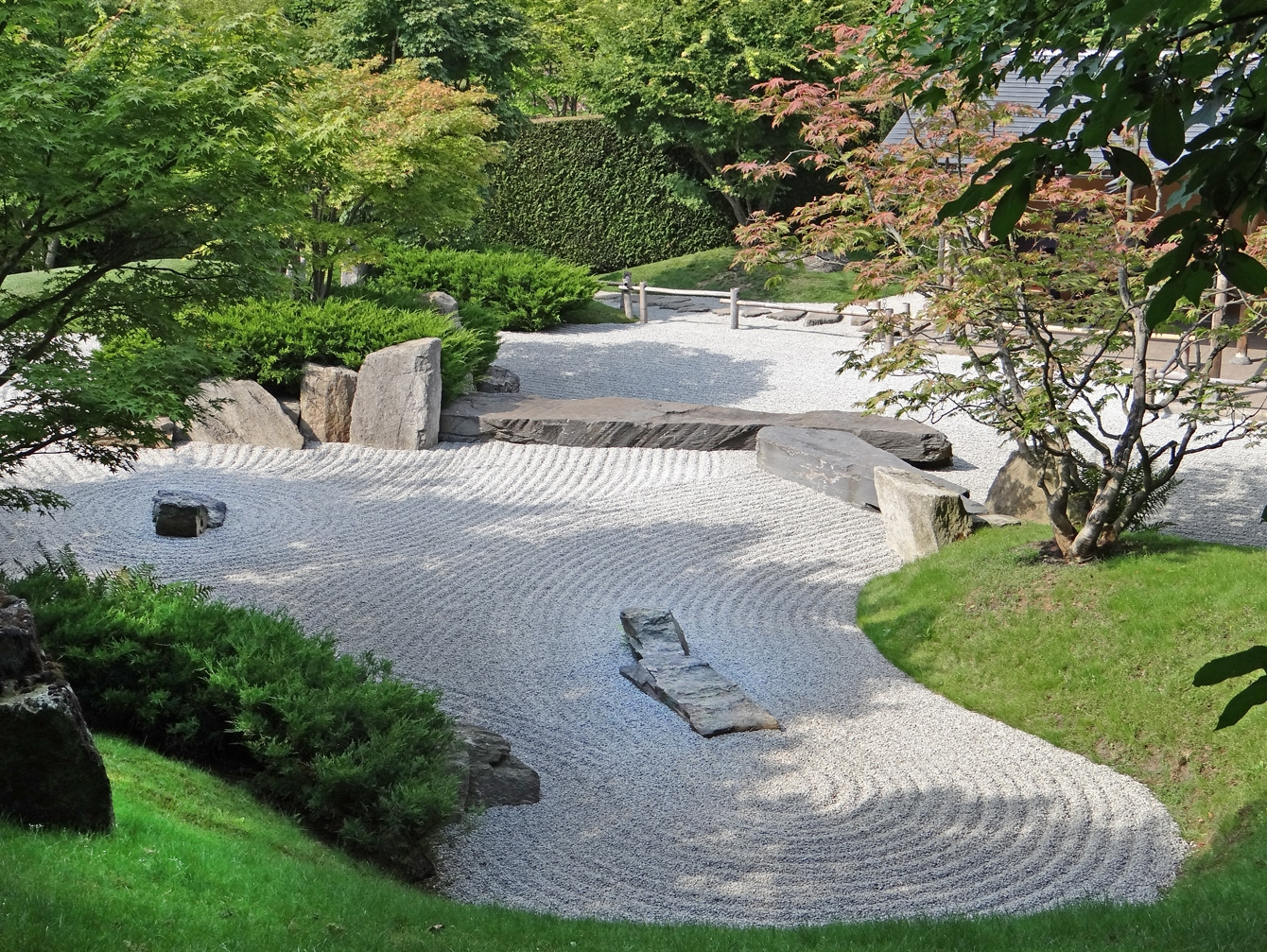
Yūsui-en [de], Gärten der Welt, Berlin

== See also ==
- Three Great Gardens of Japan
- Chinese garden
- Cool Japan
- Soft power
