= Etén District =

Coordinates: 6.9109°S 79.8632°W

Etén
- District
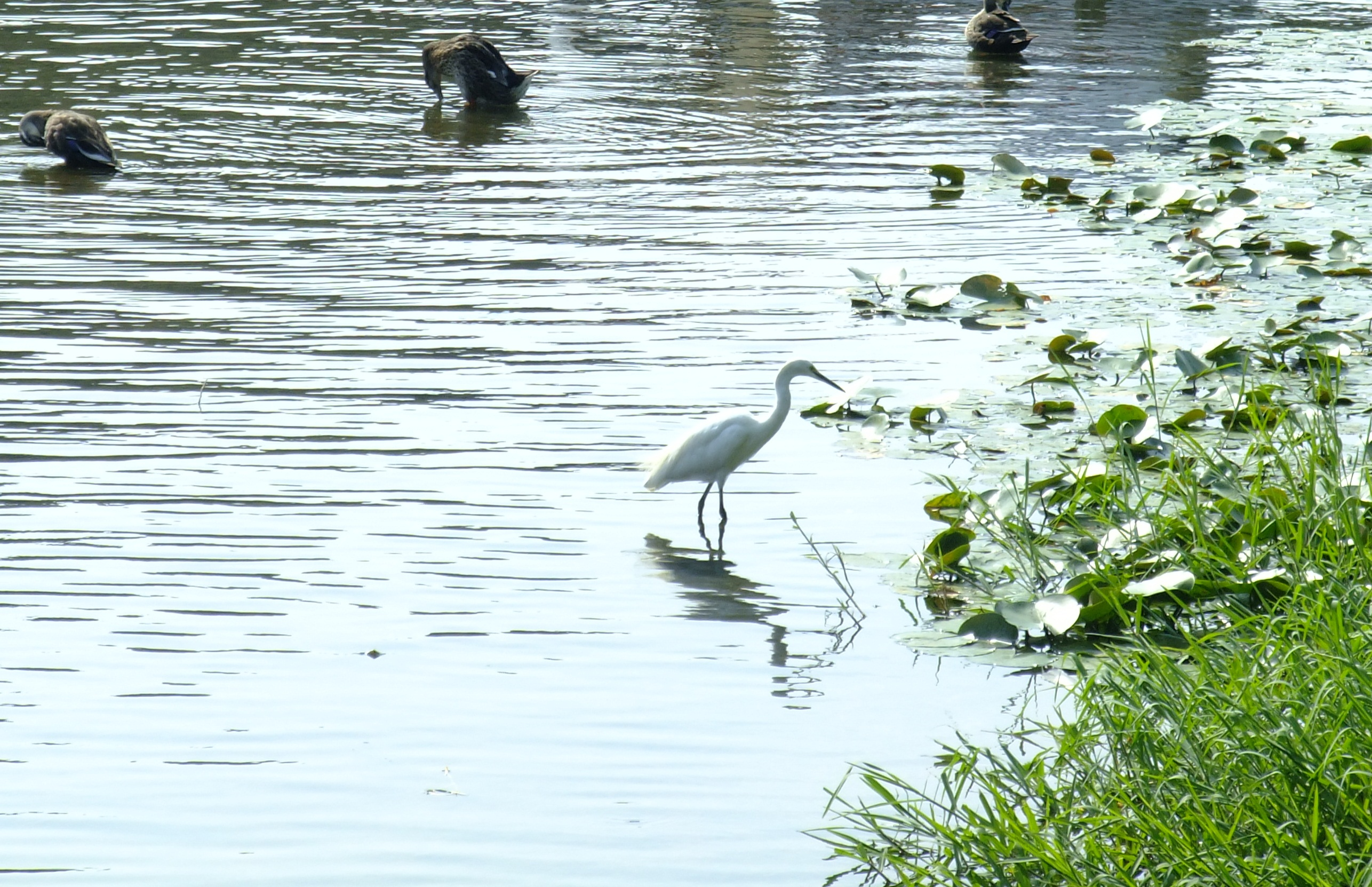
- A group of ducks with a egret in Etén wetlands, west of district capital.
- Interactive map of Etén
- Country: Peru
- Region: Lambayeque
- Province: Chiclayo
- Capital: Etén

Government
  - Mayor: Nilton Emilio Chafloque Cordova

Area
  - Total: 84.78 km^{2} (32.73 sq mi)
- Elevation: 5 m (16 ft)

Population (2017)
  - Total: 11,993
  - Density: 141.5/km^{2} (366.4/sq mi)
- Time zone: UTC-5 (PET)
- UBIGEO: 140103

Etén District (mochica: Æten or Ætin) is one of twenty districts of the province Chiclayo in Peru.

== Climate ==
Climate data for Reque, Etén, elevation 13 m (43 ft), (1991–2020)
Month	Jan	Feb	Mar	Apr	May	Jun	Jul	Aug	Sep	Oct	Nov	Dec	Year
Mean daily maximum °C (°F)	27.5 (81.5)	29.1 (84.4)	28.8 (83.8)	26.8 (80.2)	25.0 (77.0)	23.5 (74.3)	22.6 (72.7)	22.2 (72.0)	22.3 (72.1)	22.7 (72.9)	23.7 (74.7)	25.3 (77.5)	25.0 (76.9)
Mean daily minimum °C (°F)	19.2 (66.6)	20.6 (69.1)	20.5 (68.9)	18.8 (65.8)	17.5 (63.5)	16.7 (62.1)	15.9 (60.6)	15.5 (59.9)	15.5 (59.9)	15.6 (60.1)	16.2 (61.2)	17.6 (63.7)	17.5 (63.5)
Average precipitation mm (inches)	2.3 (0.09)	9.3 (0.37)	11.4 (0.45)	3.6 (0.14)	0.5 (0.02)	0.2 (0.01)	0.1 (0.00)	0.0 (0.0)	0.8 (0.03)	1.3 (0.05)	1.4 (0.06)	2.6 (0.10)	33.5 (1.32)
Source: National Meteorology and Hydrology Service of Peru
