= Manuel Atanasio Fuentes =

Peruvian writer and physician (1820–1889)

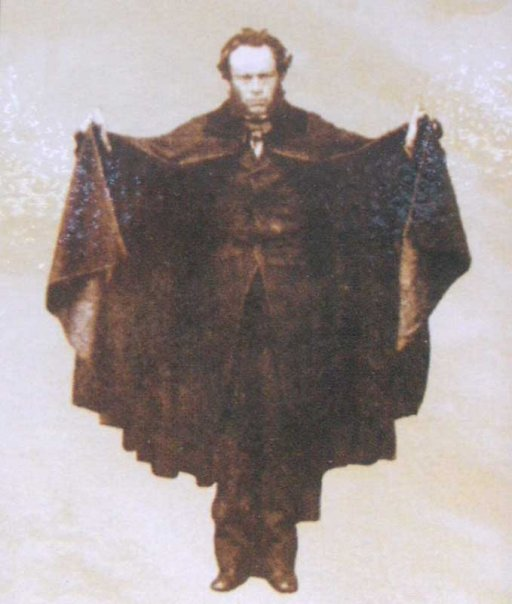
- Fuentes as "El Murciélago"
- Born: May 2, 1820; Lima, Viceroyalty of Peru
- Died: January 2, 1889 (aged 68); Lima, Peru
- Resting place: Presbítero Maestro
- Other name: El Murciélago
- Education: Museo Latino (Note: A school of humanities in Lima headed by José Pérez de Vargas. Despite its name, it was not a museum.); Convictorio de San Carlos
- Occupations: Writer, magistrate, physician

Manuel Atanasio Fuentes Delgado (Lima; May 2, 1820 — January 2, 1889), also known as El Murciélago (The Bat), was a Peruvian writer, journalist, magistrate and medical doctor. He is considered one of the country's most prolific and versatile writers of the 19th century.

== Biography ==
Fuentes was born in Lima on May 2, 1820, to parents Andrea Delgado and Francisco Fuentes (or De las Fuentes). He studied at the Museo Latino, after which he continued his studies at the Convictorio de San Carlos, where he received a bachelor's degree in Canons and Law (in 1836) and in the College of Medicine (on September 1, 1833).

Fuentes assumed the leadership of the College of Medicine of San Carlos on September 1, 1838. This position led to a business trip to France in 1845 in order to acquire laboratory equipment. Upon his return, he became a lawyer in September of the following year, working in Huánuco as such from 1846 to 1849. He later established himself in Lima, where he collaborated as a journalist.

Following another trip to France, he organised the Imprenta del Estado (the government's official publishing house), the National Exhibition and participated in the creation of the Faculty of Political and Administrative Sciences of San Marcos, formally established through the legal resolution of April 5, 1873. He also created the discipline of Legal Medicine in 1875, and served as director of Statistics in 1877. From 1879 to 1881, he served as dean of the Lima Bar Association. Due to the hostility of the Chilean authorities, he moved to Guayaquil for the remainder of the War of the Pacific.

From 1886 to 1888, he served as a prosecutor of the Supreme Court. As editor, he worked on El Buscapique (1839), El Murciélago (1855, 1867–1868, 1879), La Gaceta judicial (1861, 1874–1875), La Época (1862), El Monitor de la Moda, El Semanario de los Niños, Memorias de los Virreyes (1859; six volumes), Biblioteca Peruana de Historia (1861; nine volumes) and the 1876 census.

He died on January 2, 1889. His former 1,200.42 m^{2} residence in the Calle de la Rifa, now known as the Edificio Fabbri, is part of the Historic Centre of Lima. It had been acquired by the government in 1867 to house its printing press, organised by Fuentes. It was later expanded, with said works likely dating back to 1890.

== Works ==
Main works of Fuentes include:

- Biografía de don Ramón Castilla (1856)
- Estadística general de Lima (1858, 1866)
- Compendio del Derecho Administrativo (1865)
- Aletazos del Murciélago (1866; three volumes)
- Lima: apuntes históricos, descriptivos, estadísticos y de costumbres (1867; in Spanish, French and English)
- Flores místicas de El Murciélago (1868 & 1945)
- Manual de prácticas parlamentarias (1869)
- Investigaciones sobre las causas de la indigencia (1873)
- Derecho Constitucional Filosófico (1873)
- Derecho Constitucional universal e Historia del Derecho Público Peruano (1874; two volumes)
- Lecciones de Jurisprudencia Médica (1875)
- Curso de Enciclopedia del Derecho (1876)
- Repertorio jurídico y administrativo (1877)
- Hojas de coca (1877)
- Catecismo de Economía Política (1877)
- Diccionario de Jurisprudencia y de legislación peruana (1877; 3 volumes, with Manuel Antonio de la Lama)

== See also ==
- Peruvian literature
- Costumbrismo
