= Juana Alarco de Dammert =

Peruvian philanthropist

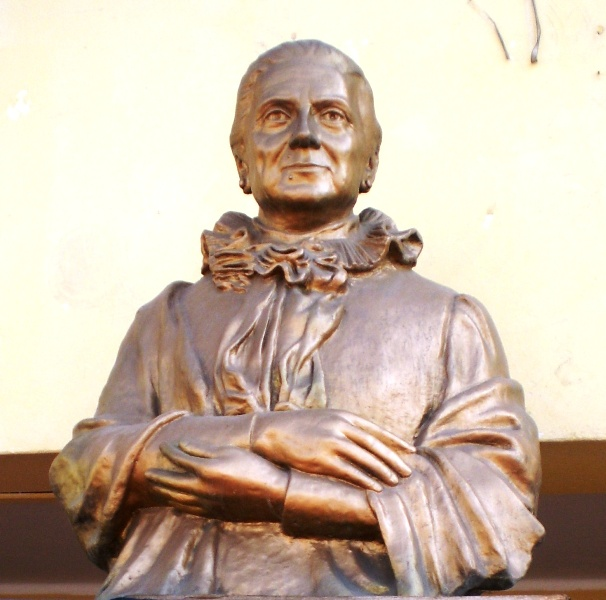
- Monument of Juana Alarco de Dammert in Peru
- Born: May 27, 1842; Lima, Peru
- Died: August 2, 1932 (aged 90); Lima, Peru
- Known for: Educator and philanthropist

Juana Alarco de Dammert (1842–1932) was a philanthropist and benefactor of Peruvian children. She was also known as the grandmother of all children (La abuelita de los niños). She founded "The auxiliar society of Infancy", which donated a great part to the establishment of schools for abandoned children between the ages of 7 and 12. She also established caring maternity crib institutions for the children of working mothers. Nowadays, in her honor there are two public national schools named after her – The Juiana Alarco de Dammert Educational Institution (Miraflores), and the Juana Alarco de Dammert (Cercado de Lima). The 180th anniversary of her birth was commemorated with a Google Doodle in May 2022.

== Biography ==
Juana Alarco de Dammert was the daughter of Alarco Garavito and Mercedes Espinoza. She studied at a public school run by Cruz Andrade de Noel and graduated with the help of private French and music lessons.

On December 31, 1861, she married in the Sagrario de la Catedral de Lima church with Juan Luis Dammert Amsink, a prominent German merchant. This allowed her to travel to France and in Paris she devoted herself to reading, which later lead to her growing interest for social health care for children and their mothers.

In 1894, she formed the society called "Auxiliadora para asistir a los heridos" (The helping society of the wounded). It served the purpose to help the wounded people in hospitals and prisons. She received help from the president Andrés A. Cáceres.

During the civil war in Lima, she installed an ambulance in the Plazuela del Teatro, with 50 beds and attended 227 wounded people. In the next two months, it was used as a makeshift blood donation hospital centre.

After everyone returned home from the civil war, many children had been orphaned and left on the street.

Juana summoned all ladies of the society to help the unprivileged. She promoted the birth of the Society Helping Children and she dedicated the rest of her life to it. Thanks to the funds gathered by this institution, she was able to fund the establishment of a Maternity School in 1896, where many volunteers were trained as teachers.

Since the funds gathered by the institution were not enough, Juana Alarco de Dammert organized charity events and work, in 1900, to reach the needed capital.
