= Palacio de la Exposición =

Palace in Lima, Peru

Coordinates: 12.0603°S 77.0370°W

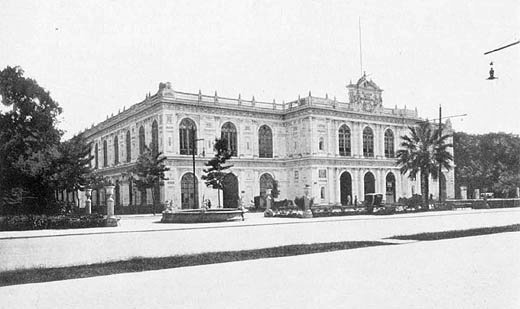
Facade of the Palacio de la Exposición.

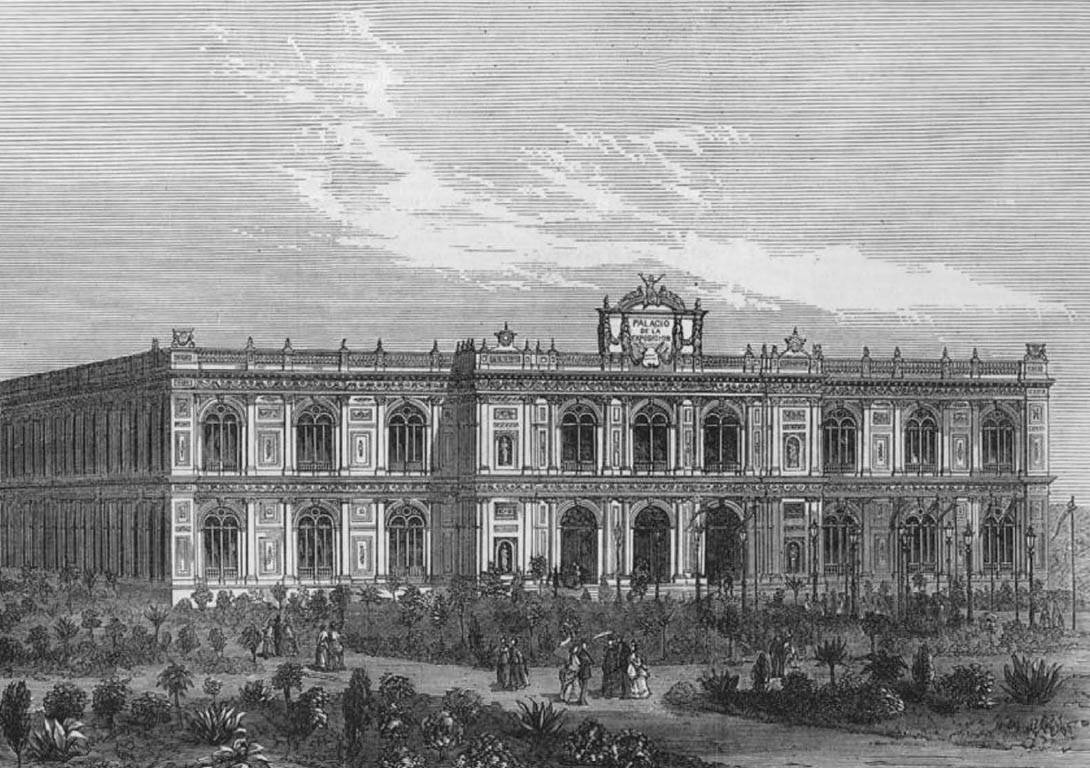
Engraving of 1872 showing Frenchified neoclassical architecture of the main facade of the Palacio de la Exposición of Lima.

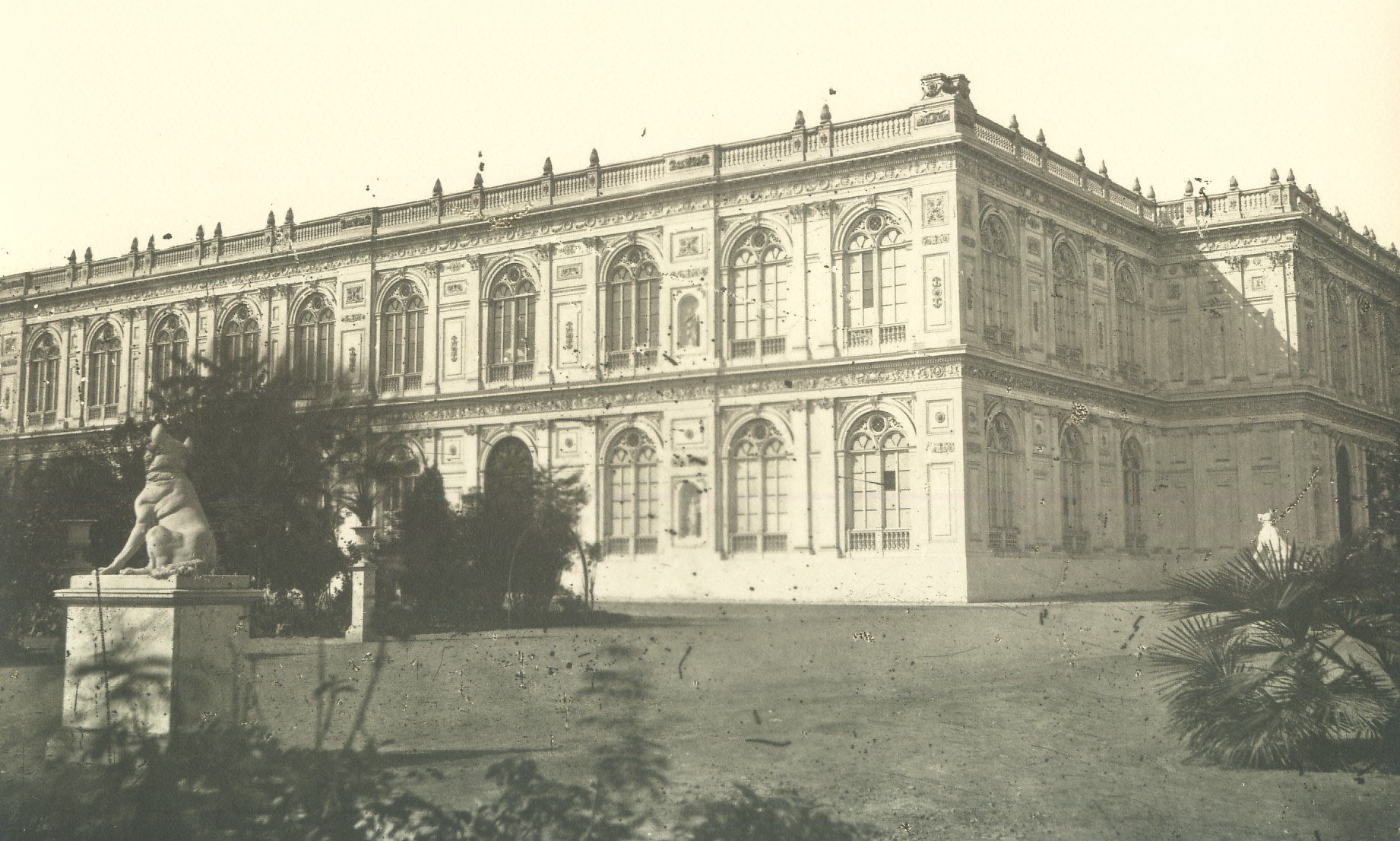
Exterior of left lateral and posterior parts of the Palacio de la Exposición with statues of animals in its grounds.

The Palacio de la Exposición is a building on Colon Avenue in downtown Lima, Peru. It was constructed in the 19th century with the Parque de la Exposición (Park of the Exposition) to house the International Exposition of Lima in 1872. Since 1957, it has been home to the Lima Art Museum.

== History ==
The building was constructed in unison with the Park of the Exposition and was ordered built by president Jose Balta in 1869 for the international exposition which was to take place in Lima in celebration for fifty years of Peruvian independence. The construction of the building took place between 1870 and 1871. The building is of a neo-Renaissance style and was designed by the Italian architect Antonio Leonardi.

Its design was considered a pioneer of its time in South America as it was one of the few buildings constructed of steel.

The palace and the park were both inaugurated in July 1872, and the exposition took place soon afterwards. After the exposition, the palace was home to the Society of Fine Arts. During the War of the Pacific the building was looted. After the looting it was used as a hospital and later a garrison for the Chilean army.

In 1889, the Peruvian government ceded the building to the Municipality of Lima. In 1905, the building became home to the National Museum of History and the Ministry of Public Works. Later, throughout different time periods, it was used by the Chamber of Deputies, the Direction of Traffic, the Ministry of Agriculture, and the Municipality of Lima.

== Art Museum of Lima ==
In 1954, the Municipality of Lima ceded the building to the Patrons of the Arts civil association for refactioning and remodeling to convert it into an art museum. The Lima Art Museum (Spanish: Museo de Arte de Lima) opened in 1957 while its official inauguration took place in 1961.
