= Jirón Moquegua =

Street in Lima, Peru

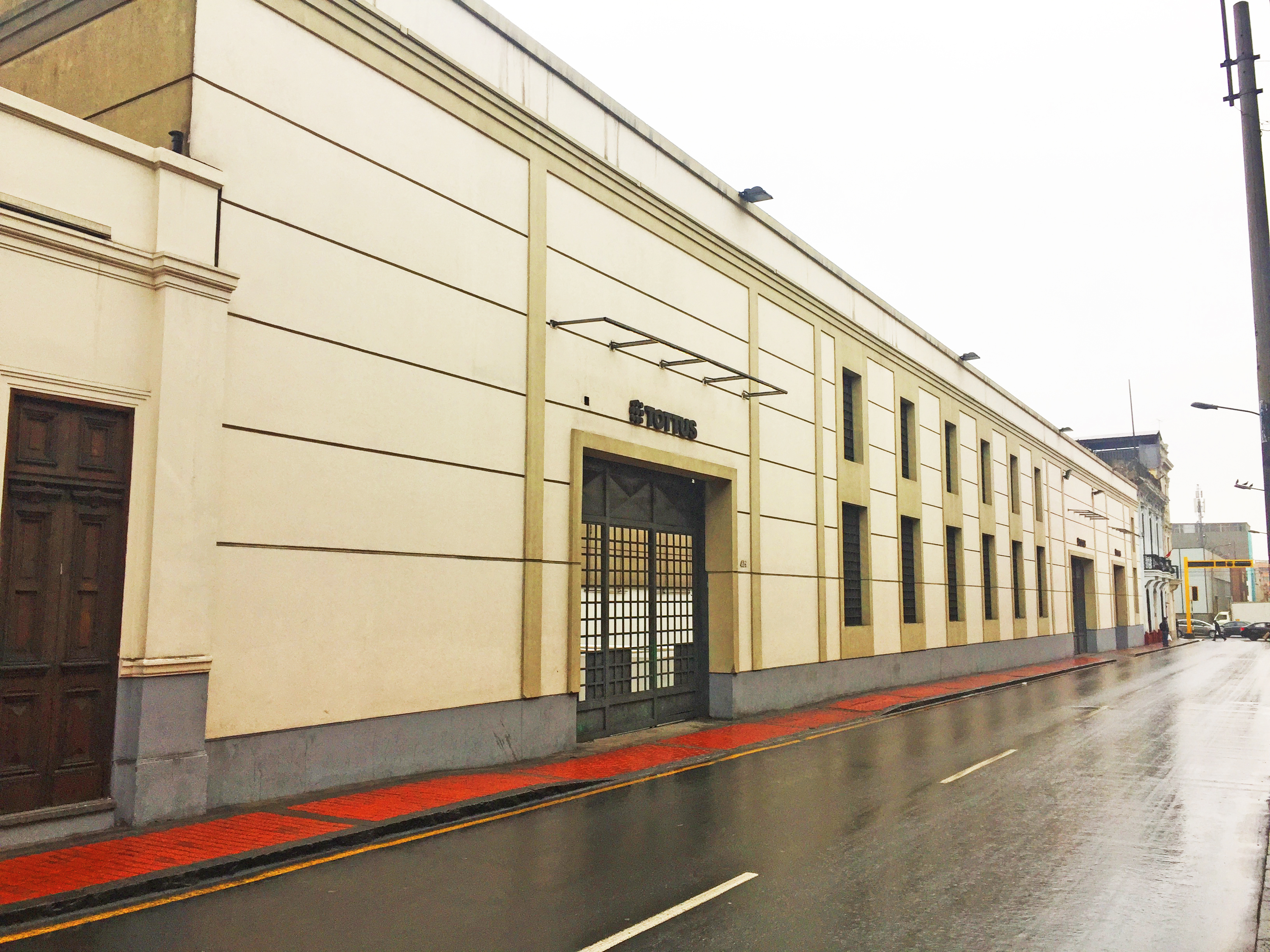
- Tottus store on block 4
- Interactive map of Jirón Moquegua
- Part of: Damero de Pizarro
- Namesake: Department of Moquegua
- From: Jirón de la Unión
- Major junctions: Tacna Avenue
- To: Plaza Dos de Mayo

Construction
- Completed: 1535

Jirón Moquegua is a major street in the Damero de Pizarro, located in the historic centre of Lima, Peru. The street starts at its intersection with the Jirón de la Unión and continues until it reaches the Plaza Dos de Mayo.

== History ==
The road that today constitutes the street was laid by Francisco Pizarro when he founded the city of Lima on January 18, 1535. This straight line formed the colonial road to Callao and at its mouth was one of the arches of the Walls of Lima, the Portada del Callao, built in 1797.

In 1862, when a new urban nomenclature was adopted, the road was named jirón Moquegua, after the Department of Moquegua. Prior to this renaming, each block (cuadra) had a unique name:

- Block 1: Jesús María, after the church and monastery of the same name that existed there in the mid-17th century.
- Block 2: Mogollón, after Antonio Mogollón de Ribera, who was councilor of the Cabildo in the 18th century.
- Block 3: Mariquitas, because of the tradition that indicates that in the 18th century five women with the name lived on that street.
- Block 4: Quemado, for reasons not known.
- Block 5: León de Andrade, after José de León y Andrade, who lived there during the 18th century.
- Block 6: Animitas, after an establishment where alms were collected for the "souls in purgatory." This street was opened towards the beginning of the 17th century.
- Block 7: Callao, since, being the last one, the path to the port of Callao began there. In 1797, Viceroy Ambrosio O'Higgins ordered the construction of the Portada del Callao, forming a promenade, later called Malambito (a name that still persists) because it was smaller than the Malambo promenade that existed in the northern neighbourhood of San Lázaro.

During the 1980s, the street was the birthplace of Bakom, a martial art based on different techniques from Lima's street-fighting history.

On the morning of August 22, 1991, three car bombs were detonated by members of the Túpac Amaru Revolutionary Movement, a terrorist organisation, who were distributed into three groups. Two of them, belonging to Electrolima, were located on the seventh block of the avenue, while the other, belonging to the Compañía Peruana de Teléfonos, was located on nearby Guillermo Dansey Avenue. A street vendor, who witnessed the action, entered the Dos de Mayo school alerting the students of the imminent attack, with the bombs exploding during their evacuation. In total 34 people were injured, including children, 30 commercial establishments were damaged, and the attackers fled towards the Plaza Dos de Mayo, Avenida Emancipación and Avenida Tacna.

In 2020, an explosive artifact was detonated in front of a shoe store, causing minor damage to its façade.

== See also ==
- Historic Centre of Lima
