= BRAVIA Phone S005 =

2010 mobile phone model

BRAVIA Phone S005 (SO005)
- Brand: au
- Manufacturer: Sony Ericsson
- First released: November 5, 2010
- Discontinued: June 2011
- Compatible networks: CDMA 1X WIN (CDMA2000 1xMC); 800 MHz / 2 GHz / New 800 MHz
- Form factor: Waterproof dual-open flip (clamshell)
- Colors: Vivid Red; Sugar Pink; Cool Blue
- Dimensions: 111 mm (4.4 in) H 51 mm (2.0 in) W 18 mm (0.71 in) D
- Weight: 145 g (5.1 oz)
- Operating system: KCP3.1 (Brew MP)
- CPU: 1 GHz Qualcomm Snapdragon S1 QSD8650
- Storage: Approx. 800 MB or 5,000 items (Separate 100 MB dedicated for BREW)
- Removable storage: microSD (up to 2 GB), microSDHC (up to 16 GB) (Unavailable when au Wi-Fi WIN card is in use)
- Rear camera: Approx. 8.08 megapixels CMOS with autofocus
- Front camera: None
- Display: Main: 3.2-inch TFT LCD, Wide VGA+ (480 × 854 pixels), approx. 16.77 million colors Sub: 0.9-inch 1-color OLED (128 × 36 pixels)
- Water resistance: Waterproof
- Model: SO005
- Made in: Japan
- Other: 1. microSD slot supports microSDIO; 2. SAR: 0.711 W/kg

The BRAVIA Phone S005 is a mobile phone manufactured by Sony Ericsson Mobile Communications (now Sony Mobile) for the Japanese domestic market released on November 5, 2010. It was released for the au brand by KDDI and Okinawa Cellular Telephone Company with support for CDMA 1X WIN networks. Its manufacturing model number is SO005.

== Features ==
The phone serves as the successor to the S004 (SO004). While the physical chassis design is virtually identical to the S004, this model introduces compatibility with "WIN HIGH SPEED" (CDMA2000 1xEV-DO MC-Rev.A), a multi-carrier data communication technology providing downlink speeds up to 9.2 Mbps and uplink speeds up to 5.5 Mbps.

== Specifications ==
The device features a dual-display design, headlined by a 3.2-inch TFT LCD main screen with a full-wide VGA resolution ($480 \times 854$ pixels), complemented by a secondary 0.9-inch OLED sub-display ($128 \times 36$ pixels). For photography, it is equipped with an 8.08-megapixel CMOS camera that includes autofocus capabilities. Onboard storage consists of an 800MB data folder, with roughly 100MB allocated specifically for the BREW platform. Running on the KCP3.0 software platform, the device supports expandable storage via a microSDHC slot up to 16GB, which features SDIO compatibility and allows for Wi-Fi functionality through an optional au Wi-Fi WIN card.

== Timeline ==
- October 18, 2010 – Officially announced by KDDI and Sony Ericsson Mobile Communications.
- November 5, 2010 – Simultaneous retail launch across Japan, with the exception of the Chugoku region.
- November 6, 2010 – Retail launch in the Chugoku region.
- June 2011 – Discontinued from sales.
- July 22, 2012 – Following the termination of voice and data services on the L800 MHz band (the legacy 800 MHz band; CDMA Bandclass 3 / JTACS), network compatibility became restricted to the N800 MHz band (the new 800 MHz band; CDMA Bandclass 0 Subclass 2) and the 2 GHz band (CDMA Bandclass 6).
- June 30, 2014 – Termination of the Wi-Fi WIN service.
