= Rafael Leonardo Junchaya =

Peruvian composer (born 1965)

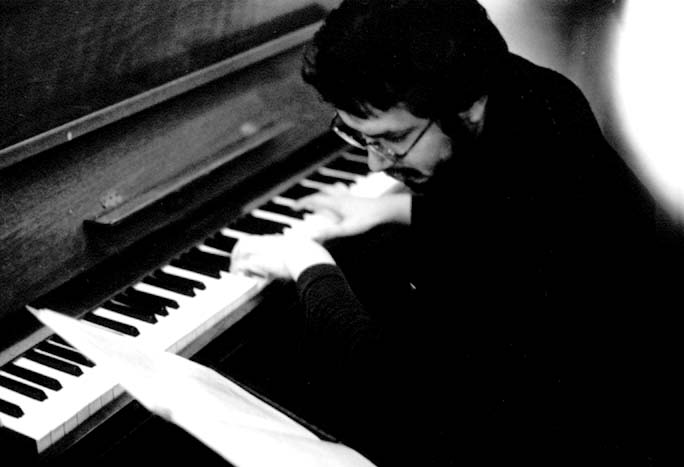
- Born: September 19, 1965 (age 59); Lima, Peru
- Occupation(s): Composer, conductor and researcher

Rafael Leonardo Junchaya Rojas (born September 19, 1965) is a Peruvian composer, conductor, and researcher.

== Biography ==
Junchaya was born in Lima, the son of physician/composer Rafael Junchaya Gómez.

He began his musical education at the age of seven, learning piano. Two years later he enrolled in the Conservatorio Nacional de Música (National Musical Conservatory of Peru) to study violin but did not finish. At the end of his secondary education, he entered the Faculty of Architecture at the National University of Engineering, but returned to the Conservatory in 1988 to major in composition. Studying under such professors as Enrique Iturriaga and Celso Garrido Lecca, Junchaya graduated in 2005 with a second specialty in composition teaching.

Junchaya has participated in master classes and workshops with Mario Lavista, Aurelio Tello and Cirilo Vila, among others. He studied conducting with Miguel Harth-Bedoya and Eduardo García-Barrios, and also participated in workshops with David MacKenzie and Carlos Fernández Aransay between 2002 and 2003. In 1995 he travelled to New York City as a visiting student at Juilliard School.

He has been the assistant conductor, then principal conductor, of the Symphony Orchestra of the Conservatorio Nacional de Música of Lima, and has led the Philharmonic Orchestra of Lima, the POV (Summer Orchestral Programme), and "La Filarmónica" orchestras. He has also attended workshops and seminars in musical research with Alfonso Padilla from the University of Helsinki, where he obtained his Ph.D. in musicology with a thesis on music composition teaching.

Junchaya has been professor of Composition and Music History at the CNM and the Instituto de Arte of the Universidad San Martín de Porres. He is a founding member of Círculo de Composición del Perú (CIRCOMPER).

== Works ==
=== Chamber music ===
- Marinera for string quartet (1989)
- Yaraví for violin or viola and piano (1989)
- Preludio for piano Op.1 (1989)
- Variantes Motímbricas for clarinet, trumpet, and synthesizer (1990)
- Hojarasca for violin, bassoon, and piano (1992)
- Cuarteto para cuerdas (1992)
- Marsyatikos Op.4 for flute and piano (2003)
- Tres danzas episkénicas Op.7, for clarinet, saxophone, and piano (2005)
- Sincronismos Op.9, for wind and percussion (2005)
- Minibazz Op.11, for bass clarinet (2005)
- Al soffio della notte Op.13, for bass clarinet, French horn, and cello (2007)
- Die Abschiede Op.15, for viola and piano (2008)
- Michiqkuna Op.16, for flute and string quartet (2011)
- Satsi Op.17, for solo clarinet (2011) commissioned by Clariperu for the I Latin American Clarinet Contest (Score)
- Michiqkuna Op.16b, for flute and piano (2011)
- Järven ääressä Op.18 for solo viola (2012) commissioned by violist Clara Petrozzi
- Qepakunanchik Op.19 for trumpets and piano (2012) commissioned by trumpetist Fredy Fuertes
- String quartet Op.20 "Classical" (2013)
- Desapegos Op.22a, for guitar and string quartet (2017)

=== Vocal music ===
- Picaflor Esmeralda (Dile que he llorado) for a cappella mixed choir (1988)
- Lied so pre-texto Eguren for voice and piano (1990)
- Estancias for soprano and string orchestra (words by Javier Sologuren) (1992)
- Soneto XCIV for mixed choir (poem by Pablo Neruda) (1995)
- Estancias II Op.3 for soprano and string quartet (2000)
- Estancias II Op.3a for soprano and piano (2001)
- Cuatro motetes cuasi profanos Op.6, for a cappella mixed choir (2004)
- Magnificat Op.8, for two sopranos, flute, oboe, and French horn (2005) Score and Audio
- María Fernanda se reb(v)ela en el salón de los espejos, operatic scene for soprano and three cellos (2012). Text by Maritza Núñez
- Poemas mínimos Op.21, for mezzosoprano and guitar, texts by Ryōkan (2015)

=== Orchestral music ===
- Momentos for chamber orchestra (1993)
- Dos Estudios for large orchestra (1994)
- Movimiento sinfónico Op.2 (1995)
- Esquisse, Op.5 (2004, rev. 2007)
- Sincronismos II Op.10, for chamber orchestra (2005)
- Varidanzas Op.12 (2006) first prize for Composition for the 60th anniversary of the Conservatorio
- Concertino Silvestre Op.14, for bass clarinet, percussion, and string orchestra (2007)
- Concerto Silvestre Op.14a, for bass clarinet and orchestra (2008)
- Michiqkuna Concerto for flute and string orchestra Op.16a (2011)
- Desapegos o El encanto de Dulcinea Concerto for guitar and string orchestra Op.22 (2015)
- Distancias Concerto for violoncello and orchestra Op.24 (2017)

=== Electronic music ===
- Piedra del Q’osqo, electronica (1991)
- Qoyllurcha for flute and computer-assisted synthesizer (1993)
- In-vita, electroacoustic music (2000)
- Madrigal, electroacoustic (2002)
- Die Erscheinung, electronica (2003)
- Sevoc Anatos, electronica (2005)
- Tambok, electronica (2005)

=== Other ===
- Various arrangements of popular music, among them Tríptico peruano for guitar and string quartet (2021)

=== Writing ===
- "Las llamadas de clarín en la música agrícola de Cajamarca. Análisis de dos ejemplos musicales" (2000)
- "Lo peruano en Homenaje a Stravinsky de Enrique Iturriaga" (2006)
- "Time and Organicity in Music Composition" Conference (2008)
- "Teaching music composition. Creating form in time" Ph.D. dissertation (2019)
- Various article translations

== Awards ==
- Komposer Kombat composition contest (2005) for Kalvos and Damian's New Music Bazaar, for Magnificat Op.8 (first prize, acoustic works)
- Composition contest for the 60th anniversary of Conservatorio Nacional de Música and the 125th anniversary of the birth of Béla Bartók for Varidanzas Op.12 (2006, first prize)
- Peruvian scholarship trust for music (2007)
