= Círculo de Composición del Perú =

Musician Group

Círculo de Composición del Perú (Circomper) (Composition Circle of Peru) is a group of musicians dedicated to study and promote classical contemporary music written in Peru. The group was founded on June 8, 2001, due to efforts made by Juan Arroyo, Carlos Alberto Cárdenas, Daniel Kudó and César Sangay. Most of its members are young composers and composition students.

== History ==
There is more than one version of how the idea of creating a composition discussion groups was born. In April, 2001, approximately, Juan Arroyo and Carlos Alberto Cárdenas, by then students at the National Conservatory of Music in Peru, began to discuss the possibility of creating an association of Peruvian composers. They shared this idea with Daniel Kudó and César Sangay, also students, and began to organize small meetings to listen to music and make short analysis. They decided to gather more people to these meetings, so they promoted in the Conservatory a reunion to be held on Saturday, June 9, 2001. That same day Circomper is founded with an Internet list, till date the principal means to coordinate the activities of the group. In later times there were also created a webpage, a wiki and a blog.

Since its founding, Circomper has made periodical meetings to listen to music and Peruvian composers have been invited to make presentations on their work. Other projects have been agreed in these meetings, among them:

- Participation in the Festival Internacional de Música Clásica Contemporánea de Lima since its third edition, organized by Centro Cultural de España (Perú). In these festivals Circomper collaborated in organizing master classes and preparing concerts. Since the participation of Circomper in these festivals, some compositions have been recorded on each festival's CDs.
- A CD recording with "Secreto a Voces" choir, only with Circomper members' pieces.
- A composition contest project presented to the chamber music festival "Lukas David", organized by Universidad Peruana Cayetano Heredia. The project was accepted and the contest has been held every year since then.

There were more than 80 subscriptions to the Circomper's Internet list at the beginning of 2008. Circomper had been a group formed mainly by composition students, but since the end of 2007, composers from former generations have been invited to join.

== Circomper members articles on Wikipedia ==
- Clara Petrozzi
- Rafael Leonardo Junchaya
- Jorge Villavicencio Grossmann
- Jimmy Lopez
- Juan Arroyo
- Sadiel Cuentas
