= Sadiel Cuentas =

Peruvian composer (born 1973)

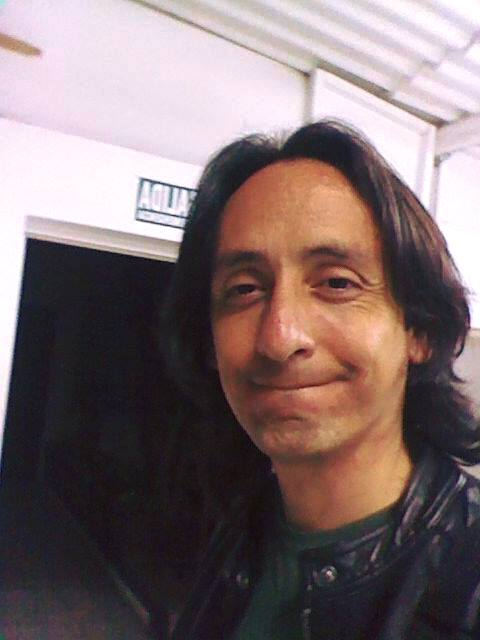
- Born: 17 September 1973 (age 52); Lima, Peru
- Occupation: Composer
- Title: Sadiel Cuentas

Sadiel Cuentas (born 17 September 1973) is a Peruvian composer of contemporary classical music.

== Biography ==
Cuentas is a chamber and orchestral classical music composer. He studied composition in Peru's National Conservatory with Enrique Iturriaga and Dante Valdéz. In 2006, his Cadenza, introducción y allegro was awarded an honorary mention in Peru National Conservatory's 2006 composition contest. Via de la Croce was awarded an honorary mention in the Asociación Peruano China Choral Composition contest in 2007. His chamber opera, Post Mortem, premiered at the Spanish Cultural Center in 2012, and his musical, El Vigilante Enmascarado, was premiered in Larco Theater in October 2013.

Cuentas has written four chamber operas and a musical with Peruvian librettist Martiza Núñez. His violin concerto, dedicated to the victims of the Internal conflict in Peru, was premiered in February 2014 by Peru's National Orchestra with Carlos Johnson Herrera as soloist.

In 2015, Peru's Culture Ministry commissioned Tinkuy, a multilingual song cycle based on traditional Peruvian songs. Some songs from Tinkuy were premiered in Europe in Peru's National Children Choir tour 2016. His work Tráfico was premiered in Canberra, Australia in October 2015, by the Deconet Duo, which commissioned the composition.

Cuentas is the author of the chapter "The musical language of Cesar Bolaños" in the book "Time and Works of César Bolaños", published by the Spanish Cultural Center in 2009.

== Works ==
=== Chamber music ===
- Cantos for violin and piano (1999)
- Ostinato for string quartet (2002)
- Preludio for electric guitar (2003)
- Cadenza, Introducción and Allegro for piano and clarinet (2006)
- Toccata for piano (2007)
- String Quartet (2006 – 2009)
- Electrocanon for solo flute and electronic processing (2009)
- Preludio y Tocatta for solo guitar (2010)
- For Neda for guitar quartet (2010)
- Metáforas for solo viola (2011)
- Dinámicas for trumpet and piano (2014)
- Tráfico for violin and piano (2014)
- Violín Sonata for violin and piano (2014)
- Sonatina for trumpet, electric bass and drum set (2015)
- Fantasía Puneña for trumpet, vibraphone, piano and contrabass (2015)

=== Orchestral music ===
- Lamento for string orchestra (2000)
- Primera Sinfonía for orchestra (2001)
- Clarinet Concerto (2006)
- Violín Concerto (2010 – 2013)
- Preguntas sobre la vida y la muerte (concerto for two violins and orchestra) (2015)
- Sinfonietta (2015)

=== Vocal music ===
- Dos Poemas de Jorge Eduardo Eielson for choir and orchestra (2002)
- Via della Croce for choir, on a poem by Jorge Eduardo Eielson (2006)
- Testamento lied for soprano and piano, on a poem by Carmen Luz Bejarano (2013)
- La Dama del Sosiego for soprano and orchestra, text by Carmen Luz Bejarano (2013)
- Cuatro poemas de Diego Solé for tenor and piano (2014)
- Melancolías for mixed chorus, text by Maritza Núñez (2014)
- Tinkuy for children's chorus, arrangements on traditional melodies in Quechua, Aymara, Ashaninka, Shipibo, Yanesha and Nomatsiguenga, commissioned by Peru's Culture Ministry (2015)

=== Stage music ===
- Post Mortem, chamber opera for 2 sopranos, mezzo-soprano, baritone, B♭ clarinet, cello, electric guitar, electric bass and piano, libretto by Maritza Núñez (2012)
- El Vigilante Enmascarado, musical for 3 synthesizers and 9 actors, libretto by Maritza Núñez (2013)
- Mambo!, chamber opera for piano and 8 actors/singers, libretto by Maritza Núñez (2014)
- Nayra, chamber opera for 9 singers, 1 actor, children's choir, B♭ clarinet (doubling bass clarinet), cello, piano and percussion, libretto by Maritza Núñez (2014)
- Yahaira, chamber opera for 9 singers, children's choir, bass clarinet, cello, piano and percussion, libretto by Maritza Núñez (2014)
