= UNM =

UNM or unm may refer to:

- Monegasque National Union, or Union Nationale Monégasque, a Monegasque political list
- National University of Music, a state university in Lima, Peru
- Unami language's ISO 639-3 code
- United National Movement (Ertiani Natsionaluri Modzraoba), a political organization in the country Georgia
- Universidad Nacional de México, former name of the National Autonomous University of Mexico (Universidad Nacional Autónoma de México) in Mexico City
- University of New Mexico, a state university in New Mexico in the United States
- Unum, Chattanooga, Tennessee-based insurance company
