= Plaza Ramón Castilla =

Cultural heritage site in Peru

Coordinates: 12.0434°S 77.0430°W

Ramón Castilla Square
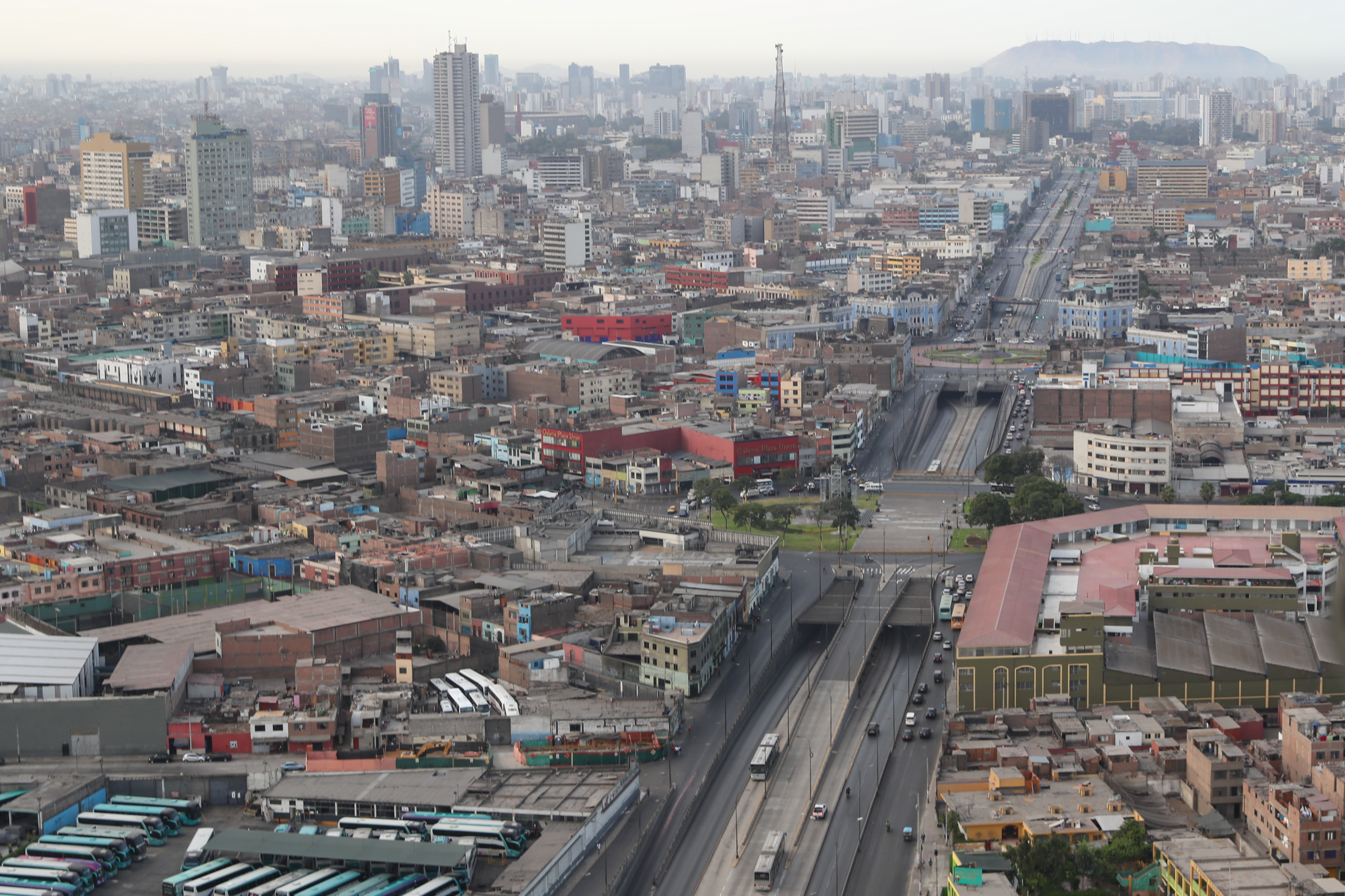

- Location within Lima
- Location: Lima, Peru

History
- Built: 1952

UNESCO World Heritage Site
- Official name: Plaza Ramón Castilla
- Type: Non-movable
- Criteria: Monument
- Designated: 1991
- Part of: Historic Centre of Lima
- Reference no.: 500

Ramón Castilla Square (Spanish: Plaza Ramón Castilla), formerly known as Union Square (Spanish: Plaza Unión), is a public square in the historic centre of Lima, Peru. It is one of three squares through which Alfonso Ugarte Avenue passes—the others being Dos de Mayo and Bolognesi—and is also located at the intersection of Argentina and Emancipación avenues. It is named after former president Ramón Castilla.

A tunnel runs underneath the square, through which the Metropolitano passes up and down the avenue, with a station of the same name located directly under it.

== Monument ==
The square is the location of the Monument to Ramón Castilla, inaugurated on May 17, 1969. For the ceremony on that date, the 14-ton statue was transported from the workshop of its creator, the sculptor José Peña y Peña, to the square, passing through the main avenues of Lima, in a planned operation carried out in almost two hours, from 10:20 to 12:25, that required the cooperation of the Armed Forces of Peru and the Compañía Peruana de Teléfonos. It was then formally inaugurated on May 30.

== See also ==
- Plaza Bolognesi
- Plaza Dos de Mayo
