= Avenida Arica =

Avenue in Peru

Arica Avenue
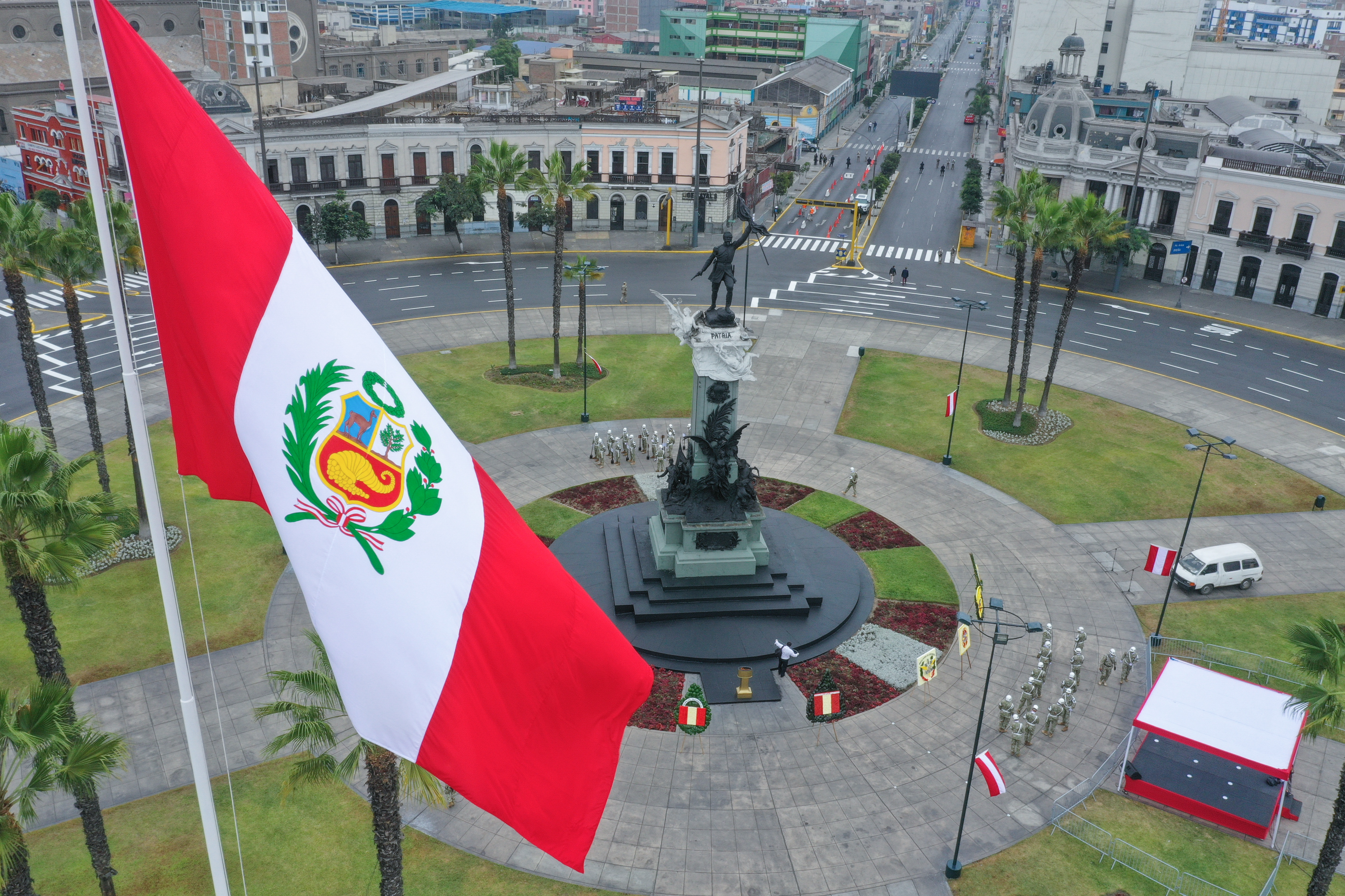
- View from Bolognesi Square
- Namesake: Arica
- From: Bolognesi Square
- Major junctions: Avenida Venezuela, Avenida Tingo María
- To: Avenida Luis Braille

Arica Avenue (Spanish: Avenida Arica), formerly known as Breña Avenue (Spanish: Avenida Breña), is a major avenue in Lima, Peru. It starts at the Bolognesi Square and crosses the districts of Lima and Breña until it reaches Luis Braille Avenue.

== History ==
The avenue's first section was built in 1906, part of the urban expansion of the city that took place during the early 20th century, and was originally named after the district of Breña, which it crosses.

A few years after its construction, the avenue was renamed after the so-called "captive" province of the same name, then under a Chilean administration that was the focus of a territorial dispute that did not end until the Treaty of Lima was signed in 1929.

== See also ==
- Plaza Bolognesi
- Paseo Colón
- Avenida Alfonso Ugarte
- Avenida Brasil (Lima)
