= National University of Music =

Public university in Lima, Peru

- Universidad Nacional de Música
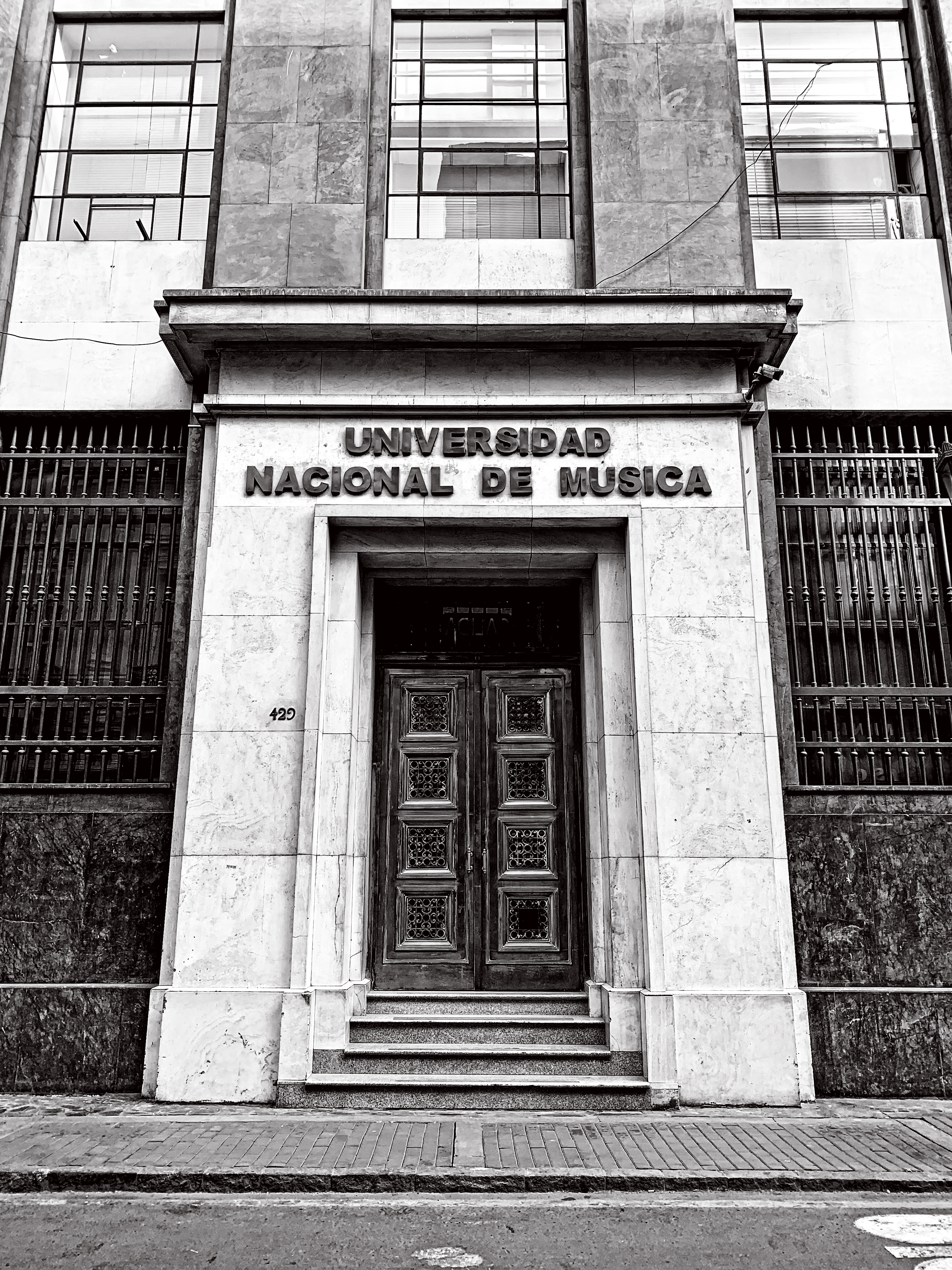
- Former name: National Conservatory of Music
- Type: Public university
- Established: 1908
- Location: See list: Jirón Carabaya 421–429, Lima; Av. Emancipación 180, Lima; Av. General Santa Cruz 788 w/ Av. Salaverry 810-818, Jesús Maria; Jirón Camaná 566, Lima
- Website: www.unm.edu.pe

The National University of Music (Spanish: Universidad Nacional de Música; UNM), known as the National Conservatory of Music (Spanish: Conservatorio Nacional de Música) from 1946 to 2017 and as the National Academy of Music (Spanish: Academia Nacional de Música) before that, is a public university in Lima, Peru.

== History ==
The history of university dates back to the mid-19th century, when José Bernardo Alcedo, author of the National Anthem of Peru, presented the first project for a Conservatory in Peru to Congress. This, along with other attempts, did not succeed until May 9, 1908, when President José Pardo y Barreda approved a plan for the preparation of an academy through Supreme Resolution No. 1082. Said institution, the National Academy of Music, opened the following year under the direction of Peruvian musician Federico Gerdes, who was joined by other teachers, such as José M. Valle Riestra (teaching Solfège, Harmony, Counterpoint, Fugue and Composition), Próspero Marsicano (Rio de Janeiro Conservatory), Erich Schubert (Imperial and Royal Academy of Music of Berlin), Enrique Fava Ninci (Pesaro Conservatory), Nello Cecchi (Bologna Conservatory).

The academy acquired a property in 1927, which currently serves as its historical headquarters, and was renamed by Augusto B. Leguía to include Alcedo's surname through Supreme Resolution No. 63, on January 12, 1939. Around this period, the National Symphony Orchestra was created through law No. 8743, with the government ordering that musicians from other countries be hired to train the new orchestra.

Under the military government of Juan Velasco Alvarado, the academy was renamed the National School of Music (Spanish: Escuela Nacional de Música), merging it with the National Institute of Culture, which led to a decrease in talents at the institution. In 1983, both this school and that of Fine Arts were promoted to Superior Schools (Spanish: Escuelas Superiores), with a higher degree of autonomy.

In 1971, part of the school's historical headquarters was demolished to make way for an avenue, known as Avenida Emancipación. The building's façade was rebuilt and its interior modified to accommodate the reduced space.

In 2017, the conservatory changed its name to the National University of Music, through a unanimous vote at Congress.

== List of directors ==
Directors
Director	Name	Period
1st	Federico Gerdes Muñoz	1908-1929
2nd	Vicente Stea	1929-1930
3rd	Enrique Fava Ninci	1931-1932
4th	Federico Gerdes Muñoz	1932-1943
5th	Carlos Sánchez Málaga	1943-1949
6th	Andrés Sas Orchassal	1950-1951
7th	Aurelio Maggioni Bonetti	1952-1953
8th	Roberto Carpio Valdés	1954-1959
9th	Carlos Sánchez Málaga	1966-1969
10th	José Malsio Montoya	1970
11th	Enrique Iturriaga Romero	1973-1976
12th	Celso Garrido Lecca Seminario	1976-1979
13th	Édgar Valcárcel Arze	1979-1984
14th	César Bedoya	1985
15th	Armando Sánchez Málaga Gonzales	1986-1990
16th	Édgar Valcárcel Arze	1991-1993
17th	Nelly Suárez de Velit	1993-1998
18th	Enrique Iturriaga Romero	1999-2002
19th	Lydia Hung Wong	2003-2006
20th	Fernando De Lucchi Fernald	2007-2014
21st	Carmen Escobedo Revoredo	2015-2018
Comisión Organizadora	Carmen Escobedo Revoredo	2019-2020
Comisión Organizadora	Lydia Hung Wong	2020-2025
Comisión Organizadora	Wilder Santiago Braul Gomero	2025-present

== See also ==
- Music of Peru
