= Bakom =

Peruvian martial art

- Also known as: Vacón, bakon, lucha total, Peruvian street fighting
- Focus: Striking, kicking, grappling, wrestling
- Country of origin: Peru
- Parenthood: Various techniques from street fighting in Lima

Bakom, also known as Vacón, is a Peruvian martial art created during the early 1980s by former commando and street fighter Roberto León Puch Bezada.

== History ==
The art was created by Roberto Puch (b. 1952 in Martinete), a resident of the third block of Caylloma street, in the historic centre of Lima, a once-dangerous part of the city. The oldest of eight children, Puch was born in Barrios Altos, growing up in the neighbourhood's then crime-ridden areas, such as Cinco esquinas, where he saw kicking duels as a child, eventually learning self-defence techniques from a Chinese mentor at the city's Chinatown. A troubled relationship with his father (d. 2015) due to his behaviour led him to be sent to a boarding school. He eventually graduated from the COEDE School of the Peruvian Army, serving as a commando and later working as a member of the intelligence service.

Both the fighting style and its creator's fame reached its peak during the 1980s and 1990s. In the early 1990s, he was interviewed by Jaime Bayly in his programme ¿Qué hay de nuevo?, also being featured in the biographical miniseries Tatán. After his appearances on Peruvian television, he became a bodyguard for a number of celebrities and politicians, eventually becoming a curandero, opening a workshop on Moquegua street.

== Rules ==
According to Puch, the ruleset is as follows:

1. Study the opponent and analyse the type of physical build.
2. Maintain serenity, reason, make your mind work quickly and safely, keep your body elastic and not rigid.
3. Always remember that skill is better than strength and resort to creole mischief, that is, "total fight."
4. Review and memorize the weak points of the human body.
5. Distrust is part of wisdom, in the face of a possible triumph; Never turn your back on your opponent. Never neglect any angle of your body.
6. Surprise is the cornerstone of success in action; Change and combine different tactics in the fight.
7. Never give your opponent a break, on the contrary, ensure his defeat by attacking him without rest.

== See also ==
- List of martial arts
