= Church of Jesus, Mary, and Joseph =

Church in Lima, Peru

Coordinates: 12.0496°S 77.0351°W

Jesus, Mary, and Joseph
- Templo y Monasterio de Jesús, María y José
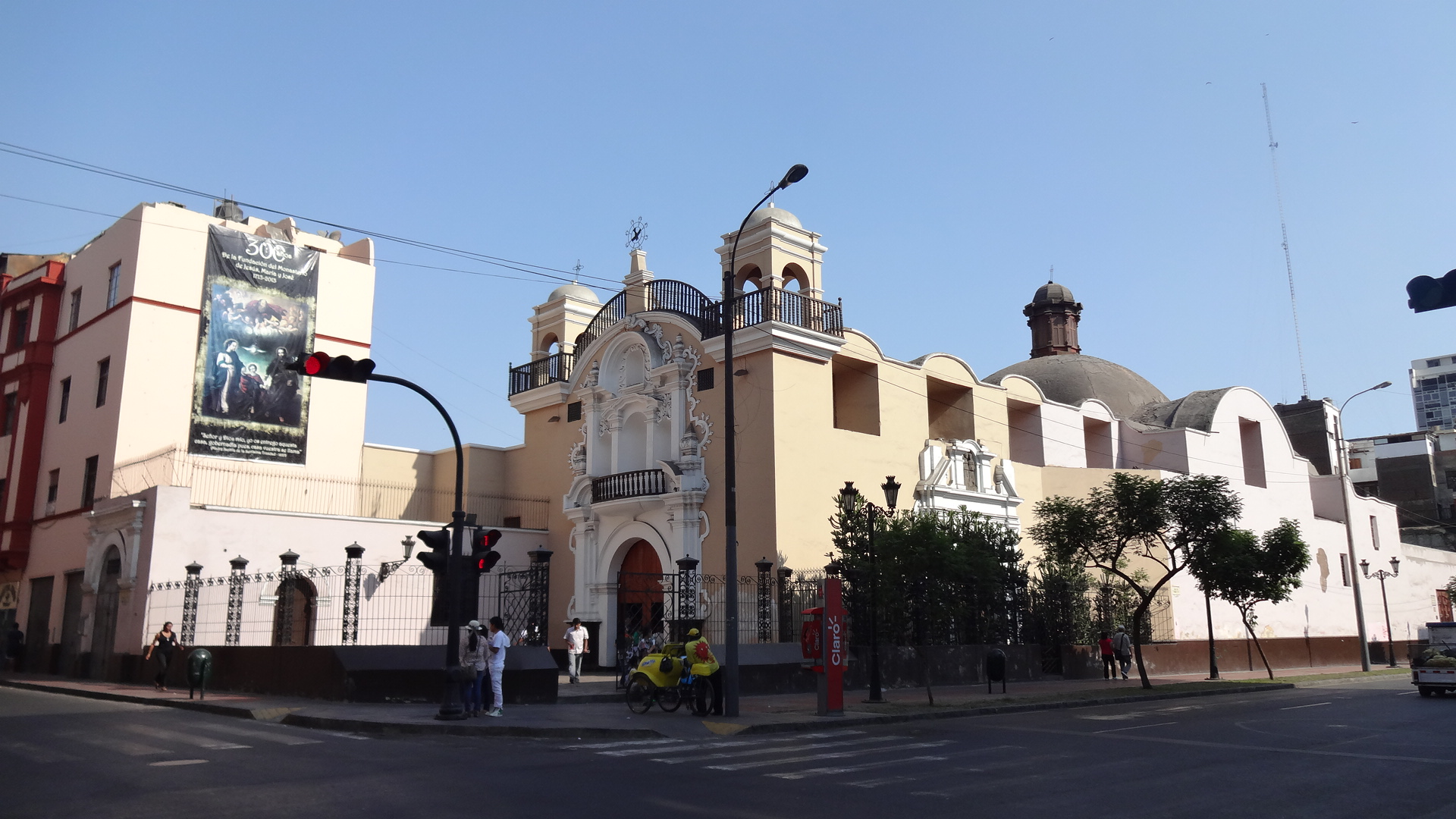
- The church in 2013

Religion
- Affiliation: Catholic
- Governing body: Archdiocese of Lima

Location
- Location: Historic Centre of Lima
- Interactive map of Jesus, Mary, and Joseph

Architecture
- Style: Baroque, Rococo

The Church of Jesus, Mary, and Joseph (Spanish: Templo y Monasterio de Jesús, María y José) is a Catholic church and monastery in Lima, Peru, located in the corner of Moquegua and Camaná streets. It was built in a baroque and Rococo style in 1678.

The history of the monastery dates back to the 17th century, when married couple Nicolás Ayllón and María Jacinta Montoya used a house to take in orphaned and abandoned youth. The former was born in Chiclayo on March 4, 1632, a tailor by profession. Over time, they became known as Nicolás de Dios and María Jacinta de la Trinidad.

Nicolás died in 1677 and did not see how his house grew, which already had a small oratory. As the house continued to increase, and the resources were not enough to cover the expenses, a wealthy neighbor, Francisco Mendoza Cisneros, donated land where a chapel was built, which came into service on April 1, 1678. Two months later, on June 17, an earthquake affected the city's temples and, again, Francisco Mendoza y Cisneros donated a large section of his house to build a new chapel, with a sacristy, latticework, choir and communion room. From that point, it received its current name.

The growth of the chapel was very rapid and the beatary became a monastery. Later, several benefactors gave donations to continue the work and, when the Capuchin nuns arrived at the beginning of the 18th century, the work was already well advanced.

The Church of Saint Martin of Tours in the Spanish town of Alfoz de Lloredo is based on the building in Lima, having used the blueprints for the original church for its construction.

== See also ==
- Capuchin Poor Clares
