= Clara Petrozzi =

Peruvian musician (born 1965)

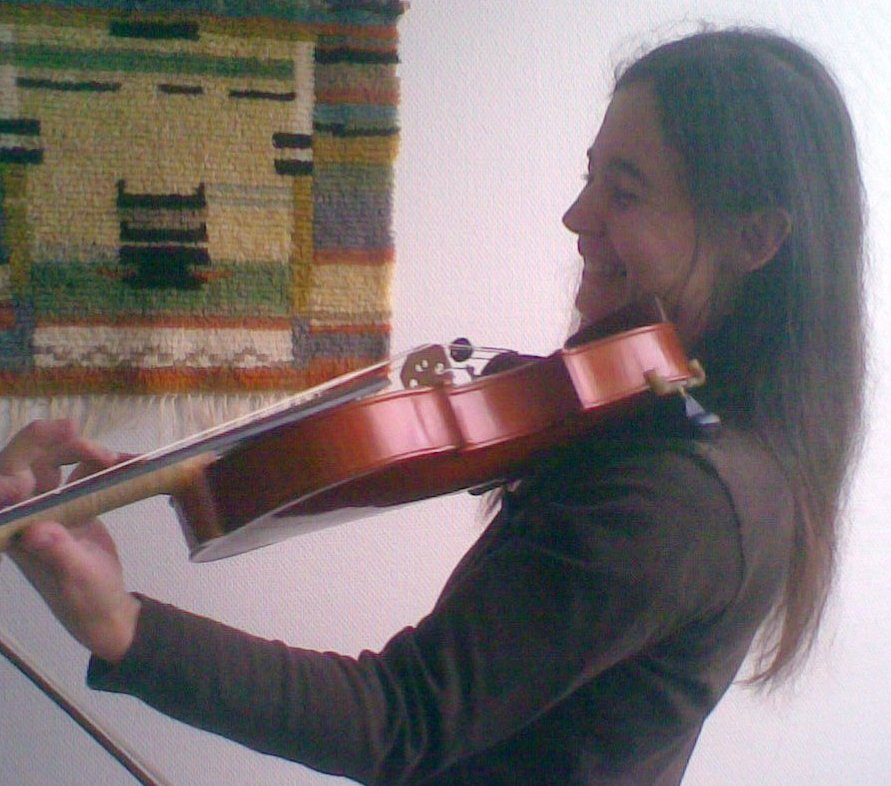
Clara Petrozzi

Clara Petrozzi (former Clara Petrozzi-Stubin, born Clara Cristina Petrozzi Helasvuo; 30 December 1965) is a Peruvian-born violinist, violist, musicologist and composer. She is based in Finland.

== Biography ==
Clara was born in Lima, Peru in 1965. Her father is of Italian descent. Her mother is the Finnish cellist Annika Helasvuo, and her uncle is Finnish flutist Mikael Helasvuo. In 1972 she began studying violin in Lima and Quito, Ecuador with Dee Martz, Manuel Díaz, Mario Ortiz, Egon Fellig, and Yolanda Kronberger. In Lima, she was a member of several chamber ensembles and young people orchestras. She has performed as a viola soloist with the Peruvian National Symphony, the National Conservatory Symphony and the "Camerata de Lima" orchestras.

She studied Suzuki pedagogy with Marilyn O'Boyle and has worked as a violin teacher since 1983. She received a degree in music education employing the Suzuki method, from the European Suzuki Association (2005). She studied viola in Finland with Jouko Mansnerus between 1990 and 1996, and Music Theory at the Espoo Music Institute.

Clara Petrozzi studied Musicology at the University of Helsinki; she also studied Composition and Orchestration with Harri Vuori between 1999 and 2001, premiering her compositions in Finland and Peru. At present, she is a violin teacher at the Orbinski Music School in Espoo and the Käpylä Music School.

Her Master Thesis is an analysis of "Homenaje a Stravinsky (Homage to Stravinsky)", by Peruvian composer Édgar Valcárcel, and its relations with popular music. She defended her Ph.D. thesis in 2009, its subject on Peruvian orchestral music between 1945 and 2005. To complement this work she has created a catalogue that can be accessed online. At present, she is researching Latin-American music presence in Finland.

Petrozzi has presented papers and lectures at seminars organized by the Ibero-American Centre of the University of Helsinki, where she has offered lectures on Peruvian orchestral music (2003, 2004); at the New Winds in Musicology seminars at the University of Helsinki (2004, 2005, 2006, 2008); at the Finnish National Congress on Musicology at Tampere University (2008); and at the Congress "Multiculturalism and Arts" at the University of Turku (2008). In 2009 she presented a paper on the subject at the 28th International Congress of the Latin-American Studies Association. In 2006 she was awarded a prize in Musicology by the National Conservatory of Peru. She has also made presentations for the SysMus09 Conference of 2009 in Gent, Belgium, and the Beyond the Centres Conference of 2010 in Thessaloniki, Greece.

Petrozzi is member of the Círculo de Composición del Perú.

== Articles ==
- "Nacionalismo, modernismo y uso del folklore en el Homenaje a Stravinsky de Edgar Valcárcel". Conservatorio (Lima) nro. 9-10, diciembre 2002. 10-32.
- "Modernismo e influencia de la música popular: Tres obras orquestales de Celso Garrido-Lecca". Conservatorio (Lima) nro. 14, diciembre 2006. 22-33.
- "Peruvian orchestral music 1945-2005. Identities in diversity". 2nd Conference on Systematic Musicology SysMus09 Proceedings. Gent 2009.
- "Identidades en la música peruana del cambio del milenio. El caso de Circomper". Cuadernos de música, artes visuales y artes escénicas (Bogotá), V.5 No.2, 2010. 43-60.

== Compositions ==
- Clarinet and Piano Duo, 1999 first performance University of Helsinki
- Quartet for two Flutes and Percussion, 2000 f.p. University of Helsinki
- Niin pienestä kiinni (Cutting it Fine) for Strings, 2001 f.p. Mikkeli City Orchestra
- Tikka tanssi (Woodpecker Dance) for Children choir, text: Kanteletar, 2001 f.p. Sympaatti
- Jouluna Jumala syntyi (God was born in Christmas) for Children choir and ensemble, 2002, commission from Rudolf Steiner School, Helsinki, published in the CD Lehtikuusi soi
- Viola and Piano Duo, 2008, fp Aino Ackté-villa, Helsinki
- Interno for solo violoncello, 2009, fp Lima Cello Biennal 2009
- Näyt (Visions), flute, viola, cello and double bass, 2012 fp 2012 Aurinko, at Stoa Helsinki
- Secreto (The secret), chamber opera, libretto by Maritza Núñez, 2012, fp Lima
- String quintet, 2013, fp Aurinko, at Metropolia hall, Helsinki
- El árbol (The tree), voice and guitar, text by Alfredo Queirolo 2015, fp Metropolia
- Variaciones sobre un tema de Jordy (Variations on a theme by Jordy) solo viola, 2018, fp Clara Petrozzi, Kulttuuritalo Laikku, Tampere, Finland, 17.9.2020
- La amistad (Friendship) for children's choir, 2020
- Collaboration at the virtual opera Eclipses libretto by Maritza Núñez, 2020, fp on internet 2020
