= Avenida Guzmán Blanco =

Avenue in Lima, Peru

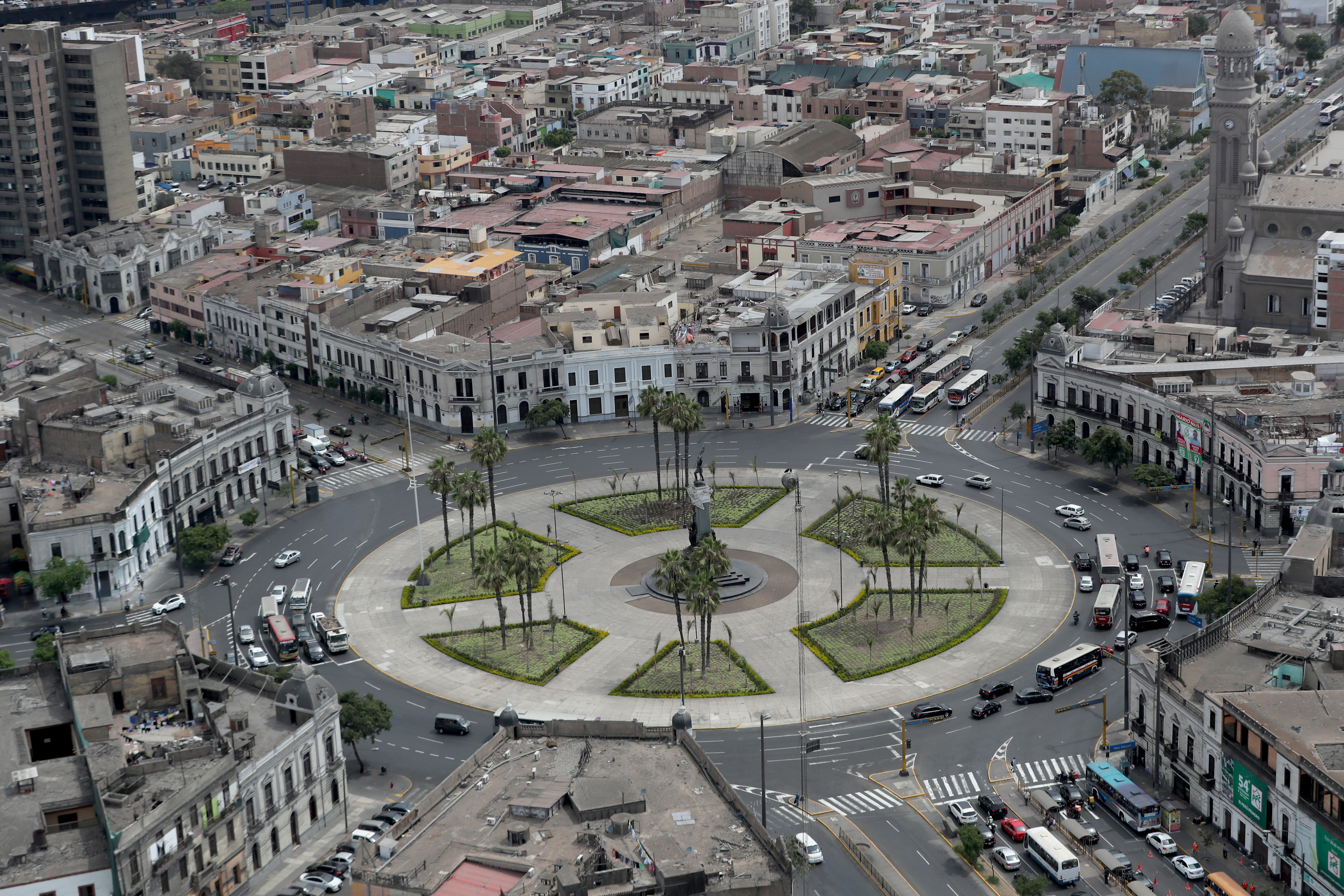
- Aerial view of the avenue (left) and Bolognesi Square (centre)
- Part of: Monumental Zone of Lima
- Namesake: Antonio Guzmán Blanco
- From: Bolognesi Square
- Major junctions: East: Jirón Tarma; Jirón Huancayo; Jirón Chincha; Jirón Yauyos; West: Jirón Gregorio Paredes; Jirón Acobamba; Jirón Palca; Pasaje José María Quimper
- To: Jorge Chávez Square

Construction
- Completion: Early 20th century

Guzmán Blanco Avenue (Spanish: Avenida Guzmán Blanco) is an avenue in Lima, Peru. It connects Bolognesi Square with Jorge Chávez Square, serving as one of the Monumental Zone of Lima's southwestern limits. Its path is continued to the south by Salaverry Avenue.

== Name ==
The avenue is named after Antonio Guzmán Blanco, three-time president of Venezuela. During the War of the Pacific, Guzmán was the only head of state to condemn the 1881 occupation of Lima.

== History ==
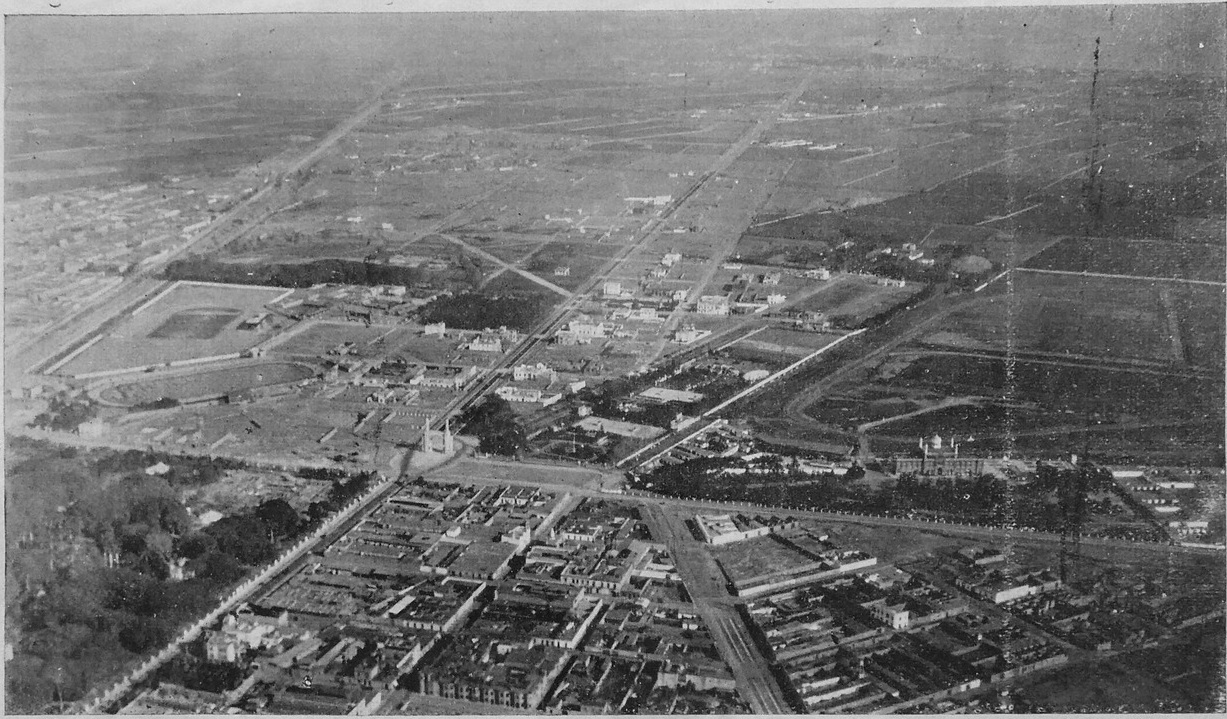
The avenue and the hippodrome in 1924.

The avenue was originally known as the "Avenida del Hipódromo" (lit. 'Hippodrome Avenue'), as it was built to connect Bolognesi Square with the Hipódromo de Santa Beatriz, a racetrack to the south of the city and named after the estate of the same name, whose terrains it occupied. The racetrack was one of the city's most popular locations, and the new path allowed visitors to first travel through Paseo Colón, an opulent promenade that connected Bolognesi Square with the Parque de la Exposición.

The avenue was renamed to "Presidente Guzmán Blanco" as part of the Centennial of the Independence of Peru and in honour of Venezuelan president Antonio Guzmán Blanco, who pronounced a speech before Congress in condemnation of the Occupation of Lima during the War of the Pacific. Guzmán was the only head of state to condemn the events.

Pedro José Rada y Gamio, mayor of Lima at the time, delivered a speech before Rafael Villanueva Mata, then Minister Plenipotentiary of Venezuela, dedicated to the aforementioned figures, as well as then president of Venezuela, Juan Vicente Gómez.

=== Recent history ===
The avenue was widened and renovated in 2017 as part of broader works that also involved the construction of a promenade at the Avenida 28 de Julio.

In 2019, a fire affected a building at the avenue's first block.

== Route ==
The avenue runs diagonally from north to south for five blocks, connecting Bolognesi Square with Jorge Chávez Square.

== See also ==
- Historic Centre of Lima
- Salaverry Avenue
