= Plaza Bolognesi =

Cultural heritage site in Peru

Coordinates: 12°03′37″S 77°02′30″W

Bolognesi Square
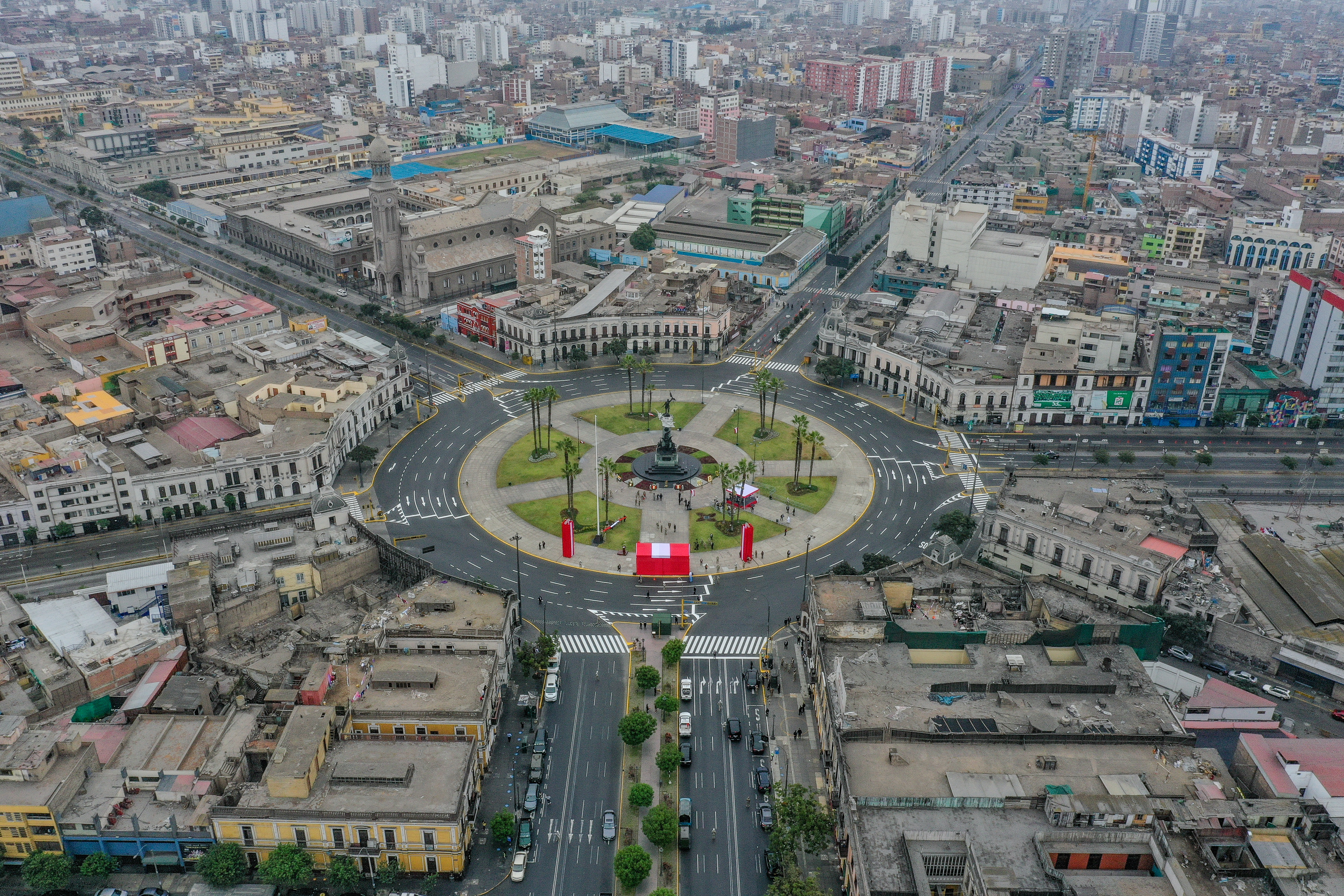

- Location within Lima
- Location: Lima, Peru

History
- Built: 1902–1905

UNESCO World Heritage Site
- Official name: Plaza Bolognesi
- Type: Non-movable
- Criteria: Monument
- Designated: 1991
- Part of: Historic Centre of Lima
- Reference no.: 500

The Plaza Bolognesi is a roundabout located in the Lima District and the Breña District, in the capital of Peru. It is located at the intersection of Brazil Avenue, Arica Avenue, Alfonso Ugarte Avenue, Guzmán Blanco Avenue, and 9 December Avenue.

It is named in honor of a national hero, Colonel Francisco Bolognesi, who participated in the Battle of Arica during the War of the Pacific. It is used exclusively for the Ceremony of the Flag, which is celebrated every June 7, on Peruvian Flag Day. It was inaugurated on November 6, 1905.

== Description ==
The edges of the plaza are formed by radial cut blocks, repeating the same architectural patterns on their façades. Their original design had a matching set of republican style buildings, characterized by being painted entirely in blue. However, these are found today to be deteriorated and overcrowded.

In the center stands an obelisk crowned with a sculpture of the hero standing in a triumphant manner, lifting the flag of Peru in one hand and holding a revolver in the other. It is a work by the Peruvian sculptor Artemio Ocaña, made of bronze with material from three tons of artillery shells. This sculpture is not related to the original monument, which was changed in 1954 during the government of Manuel A. Odría.

== Sculpture ==
The original sculpture, a work by the Spanish sculptor Agustín Querol, depicted Bolognesi clinging to a flagpole with his head bowed, about to collapse, at the same moment that he was killed in battle. From the beginning, this representation sparked criticisms, like those of the famous Manuel González Prada, who thought that the sculpture did not show Bolognesi in a position worthy of a hero.

None of the successive governments dared to change the sculpture, until finally it happened during the government of President Manuel A. Odría (whose second vice president was Federico Bolognesi Bolognesi, grandson of the hero of Arica). Peruvian sculptor Artemio Ocaña was commissioned to make the new sculpture. According to the opinion of the authorities at the time, this replacement was necessary, since in Querol's work, the hero "seemed drunk." This change produced many critiques by those who considered the old Querol sculpture a beautiful work of art which was arbitrarily withdrawn by a dictatorship and replaced by another of lower quality. One of those critics was the then young journalist Mario Vargas Llosa, who did not hesitate to describe the replacement sculpture as a "grotesque puppet."

== Inauguration ==
The first stone of the plaza was laid on July 29, 1902. But the monument, the work of the Spanish artist Agustín Querol, took two years to complete and only in early 1905 did it arrive by ship, in blocks that were assembled under the direction of the worker Enrique Días. By then, President José Pardo y Barreda governed in his first government.

The inauguration, initially scheduled for November 4 (the birthday of Bolognesi), was postponed to November 6, amid the protests of the citizens who had gathered in the avenues leading to the square. The ceremony was attended by one of the survivors of the defense of Arica, the Argentinian Roque Sáenz Peña, General of the Peruvian army who, for the military parade, received the command of the line.

President José Pardo presided over the ceremony, which unveiled the statue of Bolognesi, amid the cheers of those present. Then he delivered the following remarks:

Señores: La Nación ha cumplido un nobilísimo deber al perpetuar en el granito y en bronce el monumento de admiración y gratitud que todos los peruanos tenemos erigido en nuestro pecho a ese puñado de valientes que, comandados por el heroico coronel Bolognesi, salvaron en el Morro de Arica, con su generoso sacrificio, el honor nacional. Gentlemen: The Nation has fulfilled a most noble duty by perpetuating in granite and bronze the monument of admiration and gratitude that all Peruvians have erected in our hearts to that handful of brave men who, commanded by the heroic Colonel Bolognesi, saved in El Morro of Arica, with their generous sacrifice, the national honor.

It was then the turn of Sáenz Peña, who, in front of the statue of his former boss, was seized with emotion and only said: "Present, my colonel!". His speech contained this paragraph:

"¡Pelearemos hasta quemar el último cartucho! Provocación o reto a muerte, soberbia frase de varón, condigno juramento de soldado, que no concibe la vida sin el honor, ni el corazón sin el altruismo, ni la palabra sin el hecho que la confirma y la ilumina para grabarla en el bronce o en el poema, como la graba y la consagra la inspiración nacional. Y el juramento se cumplió por el jefe, y por el último de sus soldados, porque el bicolor peruano no fue arriado por la mano del vencido, sino despedazado por el plomo del vencedor". We will fight until we fire the last cartridge! Provocation or challenge to death, superb phrase of man, condoned oath of soldier, who does not conceive of life without honor, neither the heart without altruism, nor the word without the fact that confirms it and illuminates it to engrave it in bronze or in poem, how he records it and consecrates the national inspiration. And the oath was fulfilled by the leader, and by the last of his soldiers, because the Peruvian flag was not lowered by the hand of the vanquished, but torn by the bullet of the victor.

That same day the first oath of allegiance to the flag was carried out on behalf of the conscripts, a ceremony that has been held since then every year on June 7, the anniversary of the Battle of Arica.

As a culminating act of the ceremony, President Pardo awarded the survivors of the Battle of Arica with the medals granted by the Congress of the Republic, as symbols of recognition and gratitude of the nation.

== See also ==
- Plaza San Martín
- Plaza Ramón Castilla (Lima)
- Plaza Dos de Mayo
