= Compañía Peruana de Teléfonos =

Peruvian telecommunications company (1920–1993)

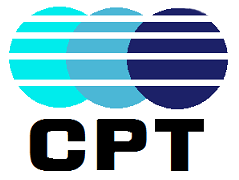
- Abbreviation: CPT, CPTSA
- Successor: Telefónica del Perú S.A.A.
- Formation: June 25, 1920; 105 years ago
- Dissolved: January 1995; 31 years ago
- Type: Private company (1920–1969, 1993–1995); State company (1974–1985); Public company under private law (1969–1974, 1985–1993)
- Headquarters: Lima, Peru
- Region served: Callao & Lima
- Products: CPT Celular; Cable Mágico; Páginas Amarillas GUITEL
- Services: Telephony, Cable television

Compañía Peruana de Teléfonos (Spanish for "Peruvian Telephone Company", CPT) was a Peruvian public telecommunications company and later privatised telephone company that operated only in the cities of Lima and Callao. A football team of the same name was established in 1970 by workers of the company.

== History ==
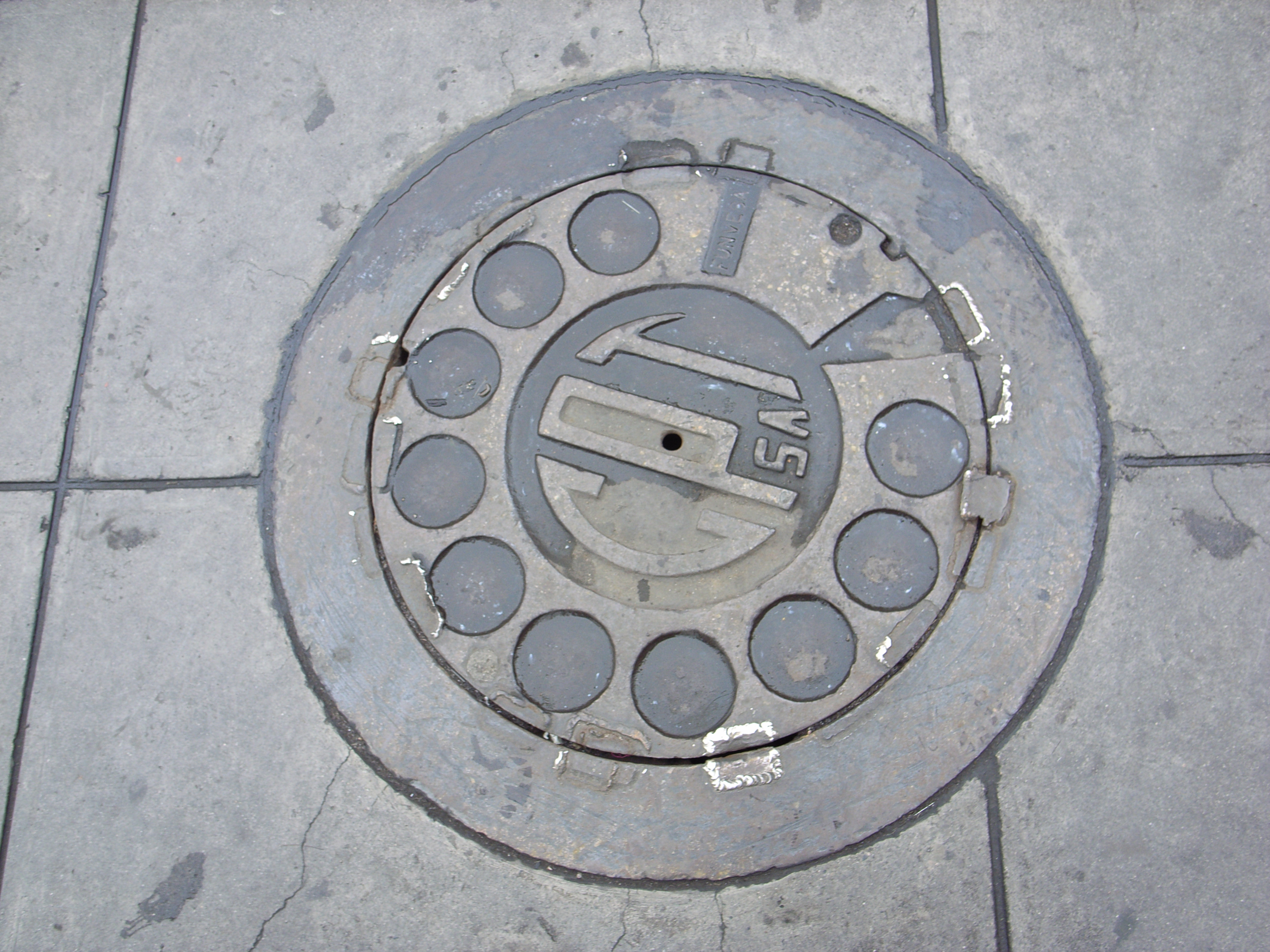
Manhole in Lima bearing the company's initials.

Created on June 25, 1920, the Compañía Peruana de Telephones Ltda. was created, later merging with the British Peruvian Telephone Company, founded in 1888. By then, the telephone service had only four thousand telephones nationwide, being all manual. Then in 1930, the International Telephone and Telegraph Corporation (ITT) acquired 60% of the shares. By December, the first automatic exchange on Jirón Washington in Lima began operating, with capacity for 2,000 more lines.

On March 25, 1970, the Revolutionary Government of the Armed Forces of Peru decided to nationalise CPT. Then, in 1973, it expropriated the CPT and the National Telecommunications Company (Spanish: Empresa Nacional de Telecomunicaciones) founded a year earlier, with the latter assuming the services provided by the Peruvian branches of the ITT and Ericsson in the interior of the country and leaving the CPT with services in the metropolitan area of Lima. In May 1974, CPT began operating the microwave network.

In 1981, the company introduced Rin, a special coin to be used at all of its payphones in order to discourage theft.

In 1985, during the month of July, the optical fiber link network was implemented. The president of the CPT, on June 4, 1993, reported the privatisation of the company, becoming a public limited company and that the shares belonging to the State would be sold to the private sector. That same year he launched his own cable television company called Cable Mágico.

In 1994, CPT created the subsidiary CPT Celular, focused on mobile telephony. During the government of Alberto Fujimori, the shares of the Peruvian Telephone Company were sold to the Spanish company Telefónica together with the state company Entel Perú. On December 31 of the same year, Entel Perú was incorporated into CPTSA. After that, the shortage of telephones in the city of Metropolitan Lima was resolved.

=== CPT Celular ===
CPT Celular was created in 1991 and was later replaced by the Spanish company MoviLine when it was acquired when the Peruvian Telephone Company (CPT) was privatized by the company Telefónica, which became the current Movistar Perú, through the government of President Alberto Fujimori. At the beginning of 1995, the company was dissolved due to the bankruptcy of the CPT.

=== Football team ===
A football team of the same name was founded by workers of the company, reaching the third place of the 1975 Copa Perú.

== See also ==
- Mass media in Peru
