= Plaza Dos de Mayo =

Cultural heritage site in Peru

Coordinates: 12°02′47″S 77°02′34″W

Dos de Mayo Square
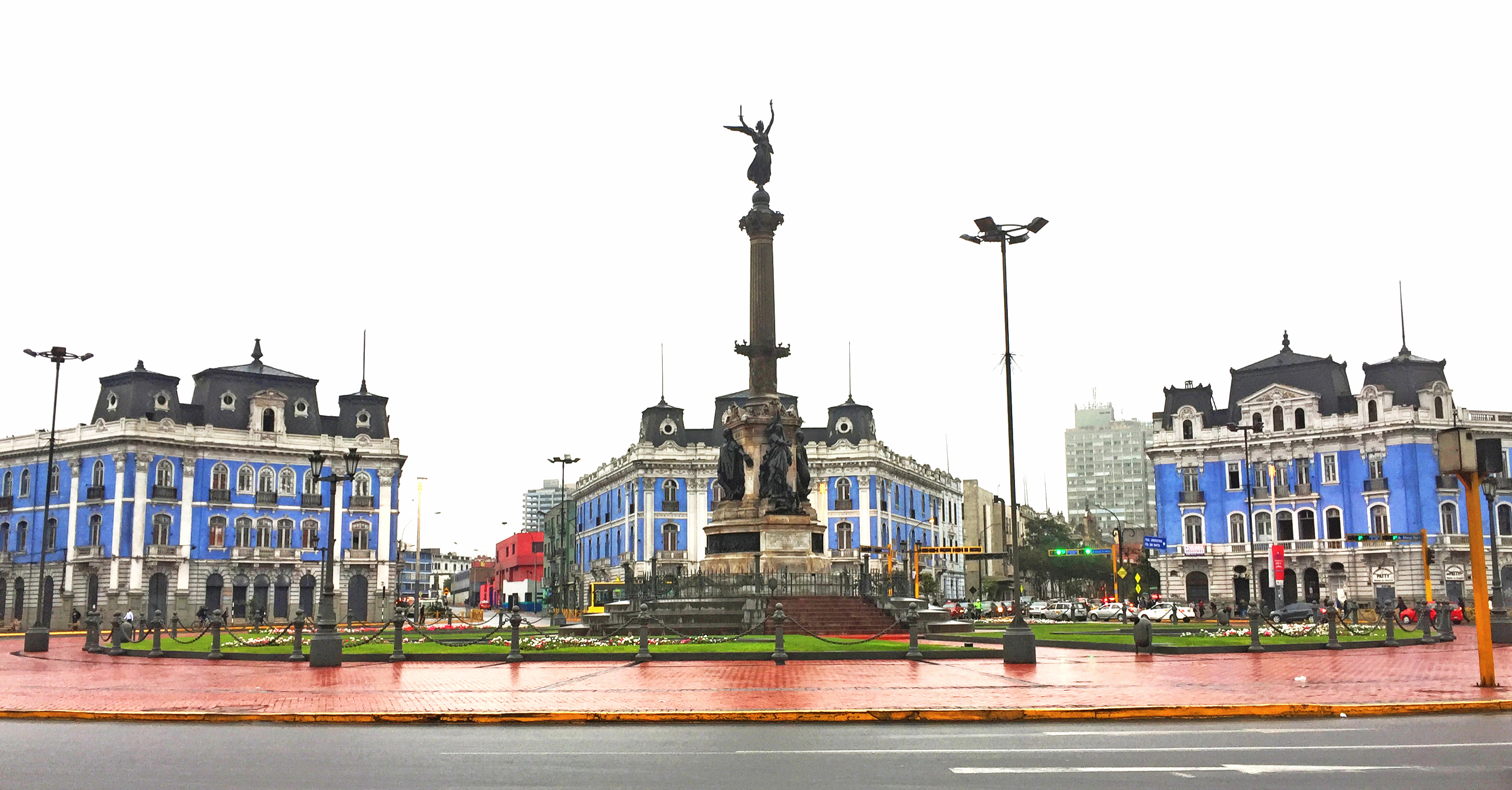

- Location within Lima
- Location: Lima, Peru

History
- Built: 1874

UNESCO World Heritage Site
- Official name: Plaza Dos de Mayo
- Type: Non-movable
- Criteria: Monument
- Designated: 1991
- Part of: Historic Centre of Lima
- Reference no.: 500

The Dos de Mayo Square (Spanish: Plaza Dos de Mayo), known as the Óvalo de la Reina until 1866, is a public square located in Lima, Peru. Located on the southwestern edge of the historic centre's bufferzone, it serves as the junction of several important avenues, including Alfonso Ugarte, La Colmena and Colonial avenues. In the late 20th century, a vehicular tunnel was built under the square to curb traffic congestions.

== History ==
The square was inaugurated in 1799 by Viceroy Ambrosio O'Higgins, 1st Marquess of Osorno, as the Oval of the Queen (Spanish: Óvalo de la Reina). The name remained until 1866, when President Mariano Ignacio Prado announced that the area—then located near the city gate that faced Callao—would instead house a square to commemorate the battle of Callao which took place the day prior, on May 2 (Dos de mayo), during the Spanish–South American War.

With the walls now demolished, the square's construction began on May 13, 1873, and was inaugurated by Prado on July 28, 1874. The square is dominated by a central monument, built in France and reassembled in Peru between 1873 and 1874. The architect was Edmond Guillaume, while the sculptor of the finial figure of Nike and the historical and allegorical bronzes was Louis-Léon Cugnot.

The square's eight French-inspired adjacent buildings were built in 1924, under the second government of Augusto B. Leguía, designed by Claude Sahut and subsequently modified by Ricardo de Jaxa Malachowski. Their concept and construction efforts were the work of Víctor Larco Herrera.

Restoration works, which took place under the supervision of PROLIMA, concluded with an official ceremony attended by deputy mayor Renzo Reggiardo on June 11, 2024. The works were based on the appearance the square had in 1928, and also targeted the monument, who had suffered the theft of over 250 pieces. Pedestrian crossings to connect the square with the Paseo Colón and Jirón Paraguay were also announced.

== See also ==
- Plaza Ramón Castilla (Lima)
- Plaza Bolognesi
