= MoviLine =

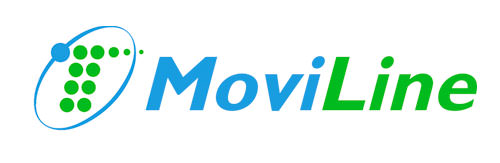
- Formation: 1990
- Dissolved: 31 December 2003
- Headquarters: Spain Telefónica S.A.
- Location: Spain
- Products: Mobile telephony
- Services: Telecommunications

MoviLine was the brand name of one of the analogue mobile telephony services marketed in Spain by the National Telephone Company of Spain (Telefónica). The MoviLine brand was used to popularize the service and hide from the end user its technical acronym TMA-900A (Automatic Mobile Telephony operating on the 900 MHz- frequency).

It was launched in 1990 (although the Moviline brand was introduced in 1993) with the aim of serving a growing demand and solving the spectrum congestion problems of the current system, the TMA-450. While that was based on the NMT standard, MoviLine used ETACS. Although the license allowed Telefónica to offer the service until 1 January 2007, the service closed on 31 December 2003 at the company's request.

During its history, the analogue system made it possible to offer greater coverage than the digital one, especially in rural and coastal areas. This made it especially attractive to cover areas far from urban centers and to provide service to boats. On the other hand, the sound quality was poor, data transmission was slow and communications were susceptible to capture by frequency scanners.

The fastest growth in subscribers occurred from the beginning of 1995 to January 1996, going from 400,000 to 900,000 and bordering on its technical limit, estimated at one million.

The frequencies in the 900 MHz band used by the service remained for a time for use in Rural Telephony for Cellular Access. Subsequently, these frequencies were assigned by the CMT to Telefónica Móviles (which used it for its digital service, under the brand Movistar) and Amena, which did not have a presence in the 900 band.

== Bibliography ==
- Pérez Yuste, Antonio (September 2002). "El proceso de implantación de la telefonía móvil en España" (PDF).

== See also ==
- Telecommunications in Spain
- Movistar
- Resolución por la que se finaliza el servicio MoviLine («BOE» núm. 312, de 30 de diciembre de 2003, páginas 46701 a 46702).
