= Avenida Emancipación =

Street in Lima, Peru

- Avenida de la Emancipación
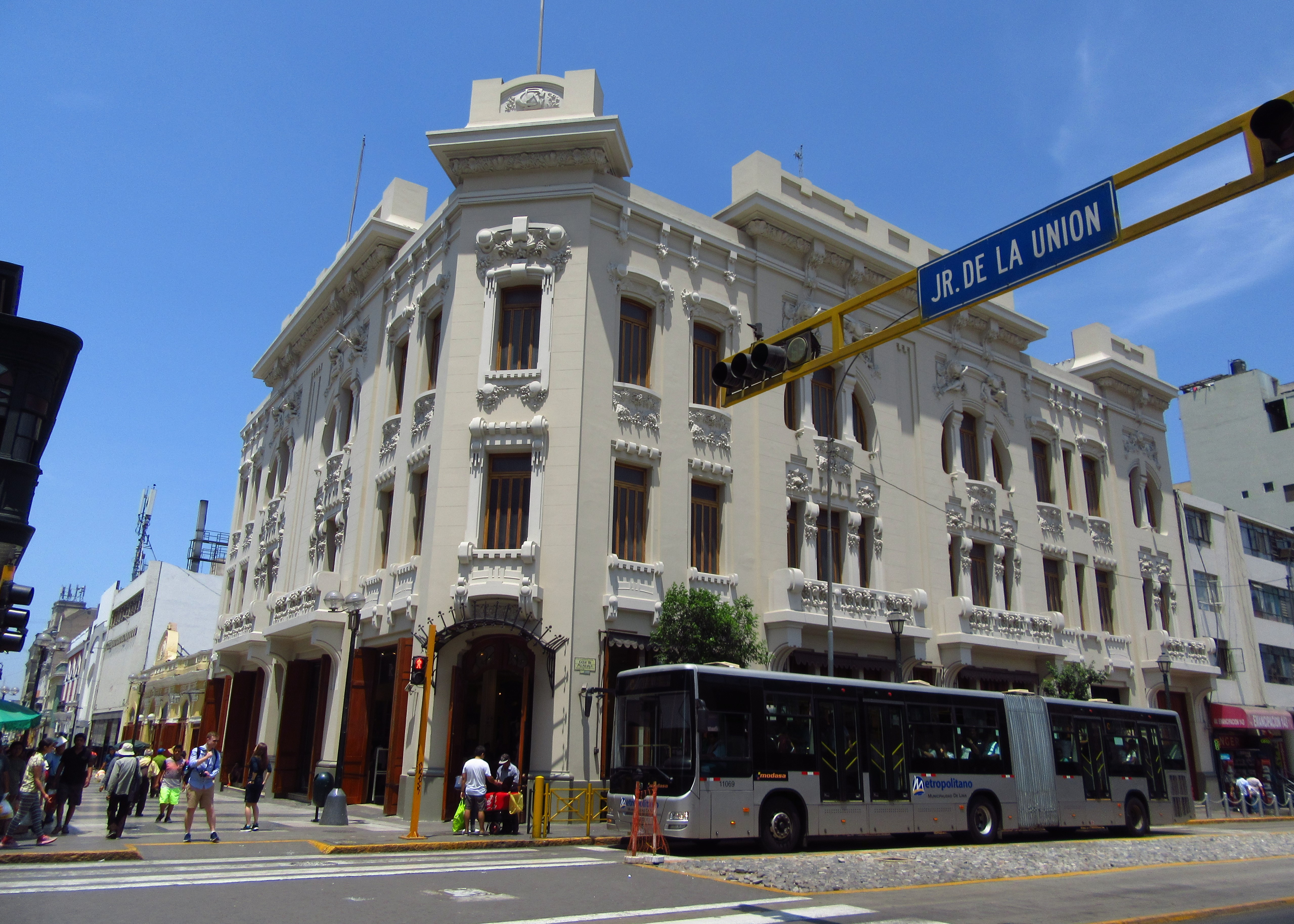
- Ripley store at the Casa Barragán in the intersection with the Jirón de la Unión
- Part of: Damero de Pizarro
- Namesake: Emancipation of Peru (Note: As part of the 150th anniversary of the country's declaration of independence in 1821.)
- From: Jirón de la Unión
- Major junctions: See list: Jirón Camaná; Jirón Caylloma; Jirón Rufino Torrico; Avenida Tacna; Jirón Chancay; Jirón Cañete; Jirón Angaraes; Jirón Tayacaja
- To: Ramón Castilla Square

Construction
- Completion: 1535

Emancipation Avenue (Spanish: Avenida Emancipación) is a major avenue in the Damero de Pizarro, an area of the historic centre of Lima, Peru. The street starts at its intersection with Union Street and continues until it reaches the Ramón Castilla Square. It is continued to the east by Cuzco Street, formerly part of the avenue.

== Name ==
The street's name comes from the project that was ultimately adopted in 1862, which replaced the city's traditional names with names that reflected the country's political geography. The term jirón is a type of street, whose axis is formed from a variety of different, single-block streets. From its renaming until 1971, it was known as Arequipa Street (Spanish: Jirón Arequipa), named after the Department of Arequipa. It was also known as Riva-Agüero Street (Spanish: Jirón Riva-Agüero), after José de la Riva-Agüero y Osma, during the 20th century. Both names co-existed until the project to widen the avenue with a new name took place.

In 1971, the street was renamed after the Peruvian War of Independence, also known as the Emancipation in local historiography, to coincide with the 150th anniversary of the country's independence, being formally inaugurated under its new name (Avenida de la Emancipación) in 1974.

== History ==
The then-unnamed multi-street axis was laid by Francisco Pizarro when he founded the city of Lima on January 18, 1535. In 1862, the city adopted the naming project of Mariano Bolognesi, an idea first proposed by Manuel Atanasio Fuentes in 1857. Consequently, streets intersecting with the newly-named Union Street had two separate names, one for their west side and another for the east. In this sense, one jirón in reality was made up of a variety of different streets. This new street was named after Arequipa Province.

The traditional Calle de Minería (its current first block) was named after the Royal Mining Court, established there in 1786. It housed residents such as painter Agustín de Sojo, wood carver Martín Alonso de Mesa, and government official Illán Suárez de Carbajal, who was assassinated by Viceroy Blasco Núñez Vela. It was later renamed after different noble families who lived there. The Marquesses of Corpa gave the street another name during the 17th and 18th centuries, as did the Marquesses of Torreblanca at another point in time.

The traditional Calle del Mármol de Carvajal (its current second block) was named after Francisco de Carvajal, who lived there. After he rebelled against King Charles I, he was ultimately defeated at the Battle of Jaquijahuana. In condemnation of his betrayal, his plot was razed and an infamous marble tombstone was placed, which was removed and restored a number of times. It was later called Calle de los Gallos, after the cockfighting establishment of Calixto Pozo, who built such a building in his property.

The traditional Calle de San Marcelo (its current third block) after the church and square of the same name. The latter housed the residence of the Counts of Torre Velarde.

The traditional Calle de la Pregonería (its current fourth block) after the establishment (a place where public auction sales of both property and merchandise had been carried out since the 16th century) of the same name. In 1613, it was named after the residences of Alonso de Carrión, a government scribe, and Juana de Cepeda, who was a family member of Teresa Sánchez de Cepeda Dávila y Ahumada.

The traditional Calle de Patos (its current fifth block) for reasons unknown. Juan Bromley alleges that the street's could've had a similar origin to that of a street of the same name in Santiago de Chile, itself named after the ducks that frequented the bodies of water that surrounded the road.

The traditional Calle de Ranchería del Pato (its current sixth block) after the previous block and its rustic homes, also being known simply as 'Ranchería' at one point. In 1613, it was named after Ana Niño, and one of the city's limits.

The traditional Calle de Pampilla de Leones (its current seventh block), was named for reasons unknown. Its eight block was once known as the traditional Calle de Huaripampa, and its current ninth block was once known as the Calle de Minas.

=== Recent history ===
The street was widened from 1971 to 1974, during the military government of Juan Velasco Alvarado and under the tenure of Mayor Chachi Dibós. The controversial project led to the demolition of old houses that were located in the northern part of the strip.

== Route ==
The street begins at its intersection with Union Street's sixth and seventh blocks. A station of the Metropolitano occupies its southern side. The Casa Barragán, a three-storey building that was inaugurated in 1913, is located at its southeastern corner. Its café, the Palais Concert, brought together several figures from the intellectual life of Lima at that time, such as Abraham Valdelomar, José Carlos Mariátegui and César Vallejo. Across the street is a house that currently houses a KFC restaurant. The historic building of the National University of Music is located further down the block. It was partly demolished by the street's widening in 1970, with its façade being rebuilt and its structures modified to accommodate the lost terrain. At the end of the same block was the Edificio Minería, which was completely demolished.

The street's second block starts with the building of the Ministry of Women and Vulnerable Populations at its southeastern corner, originally built alongside an underground tunnel for a cancelled metro system as the building of the Banco de la Vivienda. A copy of the marble sign left at the former residence of Francisco de Carvajal is mounted on the building's northern side. Next to it is the Casa Echenique, once part of Carvajal residence and the later residence of president José Rufino Echenique, Pío Tristán and Paul Gauguin (until the age of seven), all of the same family. Despite its declaration as part of the Cultural heritage of Peru on February 15, 1983, and the façade remaining intact, a large part of the interior is in ruin after it was demolished to make way for a gallery. A project by PROLIMA was announced in 2023, which aims to restore the former architecture of the house's interior.

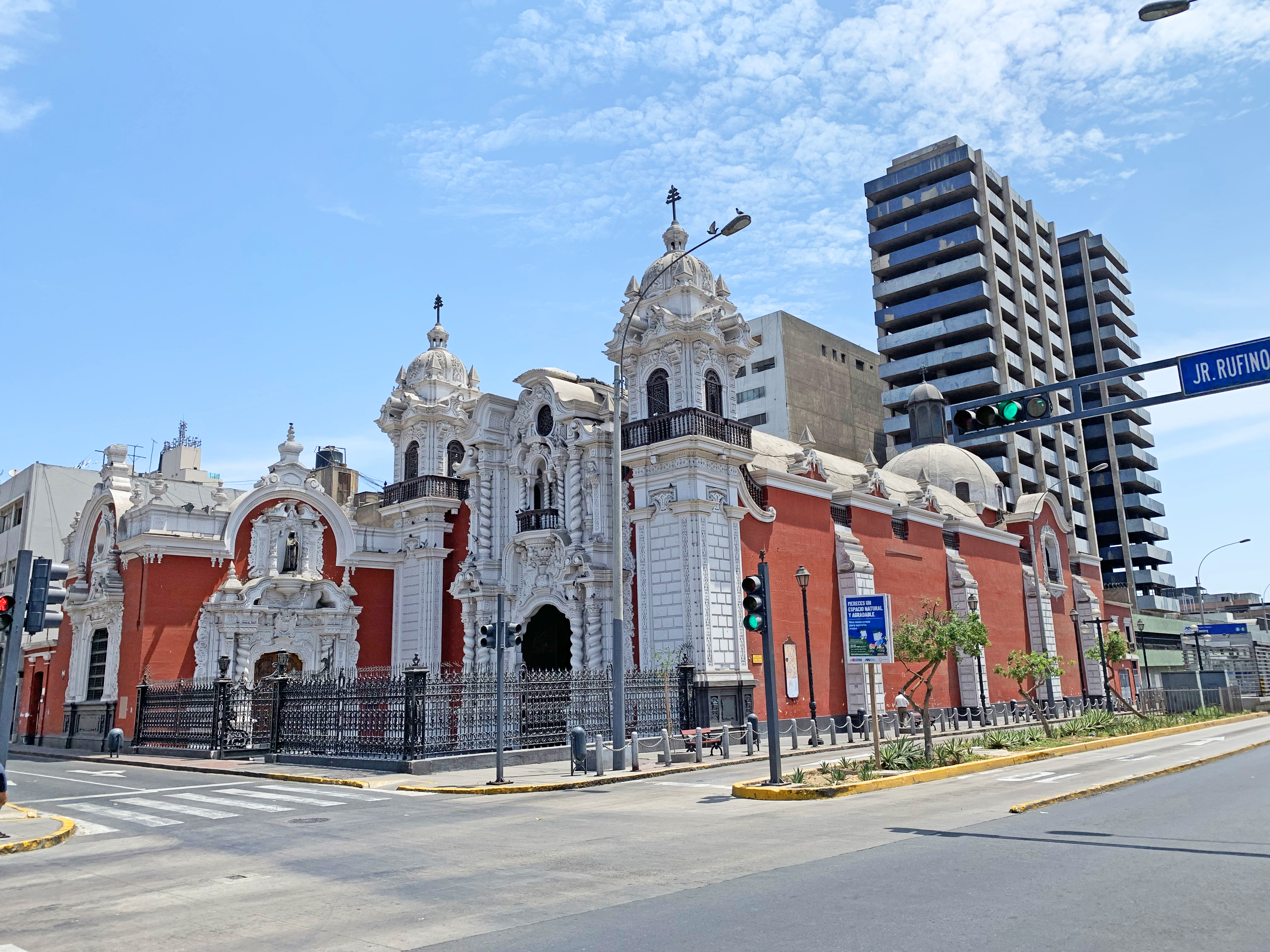
The church dedicated to Saint Marcellus.

The street's third and fourth block feature San Marcelo Square and Church. The former features a sculpture dedicated to María Laos, who was killed in 1930 while unsuccessfully trying to protect her husband, Antonio Miró Quesada de la Guerra, from Carlos Steer Lafont, leader of the Aprista Youth Federation. Across the street was the house of Pedro Beltrán Espantoso, owner of the disappeared La Prensa. It was the last home to be demolished with the street's widening, and its demolition was the focus of a fierce debate that concluded when it was demolished during a two-week period while its owner was on a trip, starting on September 16, 1971.

The fourth block concludes at its intersection with Tacna Avenue. This corner houses the Edificio Oropeza, an incomplete building that has been abandoned for over three decades. A station of the Metropolitano is located next to the building, and continues on the street's sixth block on the other side of the avenue.

The street final blocks continue into Monserrate, a historic neighbourhood of Lima limited by this avenue, as well as those of Tacna and Alfonso Ugarte. The street's ninth block reaches Ramón Castilla Square, where the Metropolitano station of the same name is located.

== Transport ==
The street is divided into four lanes. Two are used for regular vehicular transit, while two are reserved for the city's bus system.

=== Bus service ===
The Metropolitano, the city's bus service, operates its Route C alongside the avenue. Since 2009, a station (Jirón de la Unión) services its first block. Two more stations (Tacna and Ramón Castilla) are located near Tacna Avenue and Ramón Castilla Square, respectively.

== See also ==
- Historic Centre of Lima
- Jirón Cuzco
