= Total Access Communication System =

1G mobile phone system

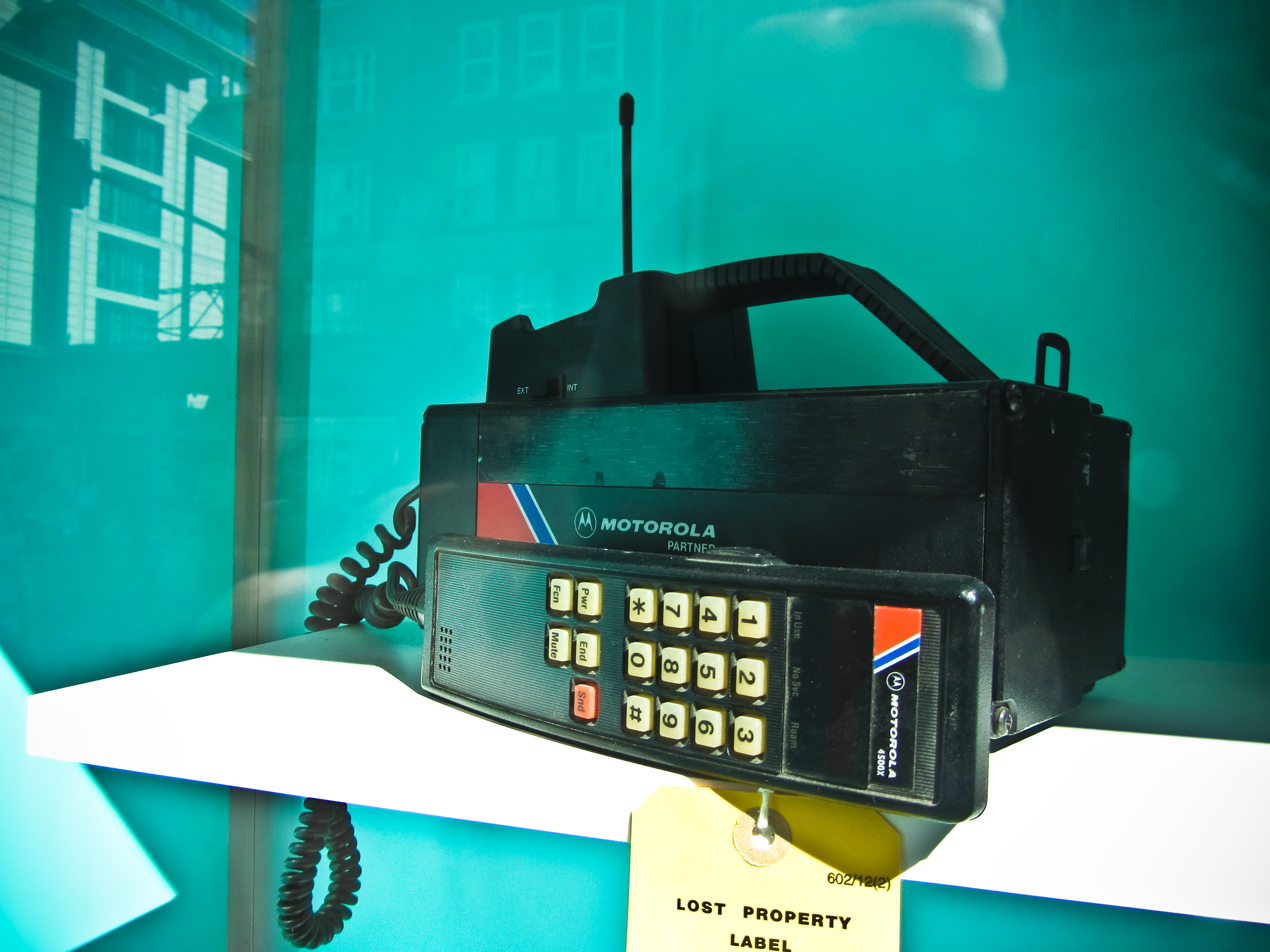
A first-generation Motorola 4500X transportable phone (a hybrid between car phone and mobile phone) for the TACS network, c. 1987

Total Access Communication System (TACS) was an analogue cellular (1G) telephone system. It was a variant of the Advanced Mobile Phone System (AMPS), developed by the British state with partners and deployed throughout the United Kingdom from 1985. The system operated domestically in the 900 MHz UHF radio spectrum band.

The Motorola Personal Phone (released 1992) on top of its packaging, an ETACS mobile phone

An upgraded variant named Extended Total Access Communication System (ETACS) was deployed in 1989 which opened up more spectrum to increase capacity and reduce network overcrowding in busy areas. Outside of Britain the TACS system was also used at one point in other countries including Austria, Hong Kong, Italy, Ireland and Spain, as well as in Japan under the name Japanese Total Access Communication (JTAC). TACS was made obsolete by 2G systems like GSM and has been shut down worldwide.

== History ==
It was announced as the choice for the first two British national cellular systems in February 1983, less than a year after the UK government announced the T&Cs for the two competing mobile phone networks in June 1982. Vodafone (known then as Racal-Vodafone) opted for a £30 million turnkey contract from Ericsson (ERA) to design, build and set up its initial network of 100 base station sites.

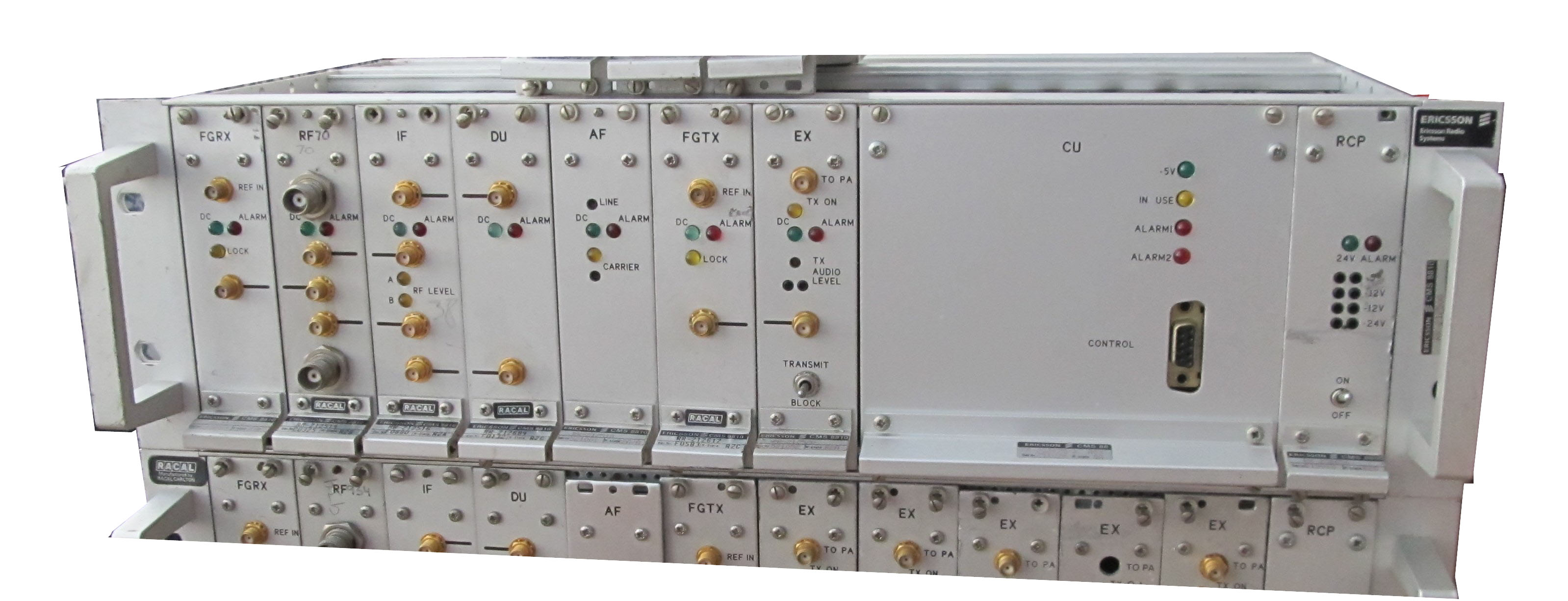
Vodafone used CMS8810 equipment designed by Ericsson some of which was made under licence by Racal Carlton Nottingham

Cellnet (then known Telecom Securicor Cellular Radio Ltd) used development labs in the facilities at General Electric (later made part of Motorola) based at Lynchburg, Virginia, United States. The reason Cellnet used the General Electric labs was because the AMPS system was already in development there, and the company had set up a production facility in readiness for AMPS production in 1985 which the Cellnet TACS was to share. In March 1984 development of prototypes began at General Electric. Production began in 1985 and General Electric produced 20,000 systems that year for Cellnet's distribution in the UK. Production of what was to become the Motorola model were then made at Stotfold, Bedfordshire, England. This production facility continued making TACS until the advent of GSM.

TACS and ETACS are now obsolete in Europe, having been replaced by the GSM (Global System for Mobile Communications) system. In the United Kingdom, the last ETACS service operated by Vodafone was discontinued on 31 May 2001, after 16 years of service. The competing service in the UK operated by Cellnet (latterly BT Cellnet) was closed on Sunday 1 October 2000. In Italy, the ETACS service remained live as far as 2005.

Eircell (now Vodafone Ireland) closed its TACS network on 26 January 2001. This followed a long period during which customers were encouraged to switch to GSM services. When the network was closed, there were very few, if any, active TACS customers left. Customers who switched network were able to keep their phone number, but the (088) prefix was changed to either 087 (Eircell, now Vodafone Ireland) GSM or 086 (Esat Digifone, which became O2 Ireland before merging with Three) GSM. At the time, full mobile number portability was not available to TACS customers and the (088) prefix was closed. An automatic voice message was left in place for 12 months advising callers of the customer's new prefix.

== Frequency bands used by ETACS in the UK ==
Channel	Cell TX (MHz)	Mobile TX (MHz)	Notes
1	935.0125	890.0125	25 kHz spaced channels
23	935.5625	890.5625	1st of 21 dedicated vodafone control channels
24	935.5650	890.5650	2nd of 21 dedicated vodafone control channels
300	942.4875	898.0625	9.5 kHz peak speech fm deviation
323	943.0625	898.0625	1st of 21 dedicated cellnet control channels
600	949.9875	904.9875	Last TACS channel, ETACS extended this to 1320 later

TACS BAND Summary

Base TX Start	End (MHz)	Mobile start	End (MHz)	Band
935	950	890	905	TACS 600 Channels
935	960	890	915	TACS 1000 Channels
917	950	872	905	E-TACS 1320 Channels

ESNs were issued in batches of 65535 by BABT for phone manufacturers to program into each cellular phone to make each one unique to the TACS network with which it attempted to register.

The following countries had more than two batches of ESNs allocated to them: UK, Italy, Austria, China, Malaysia, Hong Kong, Singapore, Bahrain, UAE, Kuwait, Philippines, Sri Lanka, Australia.

== TACS and AMPS specifications compared ==
Feature	TACS	AMPS
Channel Spacing	25 kHz	30 kHz
Speech peak Freq Dev	9.5 kHz	12 kHz
Signalling FSK peak Freq Dev	6.4 kHz	8 kHz
Signalling rate	8 kbit/s	10 kbit/s
SAT 0	5970 Hz	5970 Hz
SAT 1	6000 Hz	6000 Hz
SAT 2	6030 Hz	6030 Hz
ST	8000 Hz	10000 Hz
Mobile TX pwr MAC 0	10 W	4 W
Mobile TX pwr MAC 1	1.6 W	1.6 W
Mobile TX pwr MAC 2	630 mW	630 mW
Mobile TX pwr MAC 3	250 mW	250 mW
Mobile TX pwr MAC 4	100 mW	100 mW
Mobile TX pwr MAC 5	40 mW	40 mW
Mobile TX pwr MAC 6	16 mW	16 mW
Mobile TX pwr MAC 7	6.3 mW	6.3 mW

== Commercial deployments ==
Country	Operator(s)	ƒ (MHz)	Launch date	End of service	Notes
United Kingdom Jersey	Vodafone Cellnet; Jersey Telecom		Jan 1985 Jan 1985; 1987	May 2001 Oct 2000; 1999	
Ireland	Eircell		Dec 1985	Jan 2001	
Hong Kong	CSL Mobile Hutchison Telecom		1987	May 1996	
China	China Mobile		Nov 1987	Dec 2001	
Macau	CTM		Nov 1988	Feb 2001	
Sri Lanka	Celltel		1989	2006	
Japan	DDI		Jul 1989	Sep 2000	
Malaysia	Celcom		1989		Named ART-900.
Mauritania			1989		
United Arab Emirates			1989		
Ghana					
Bahrain					
Kuwait					
Italy	TIM		Apr 1990	Dec 2005	
Spain	MoviLine		Apr 1990	Dec 2003	Named TMA-900.
Austria	Mobilkom		Jul 1990	Feb 2002	
Malta					
Nigeria			1991		
Singapore			1991		
Kenya			1992		
Mauritius					
