= Jorge Eduardo Eielson =

Peruvian artist & writer (1924–2006)

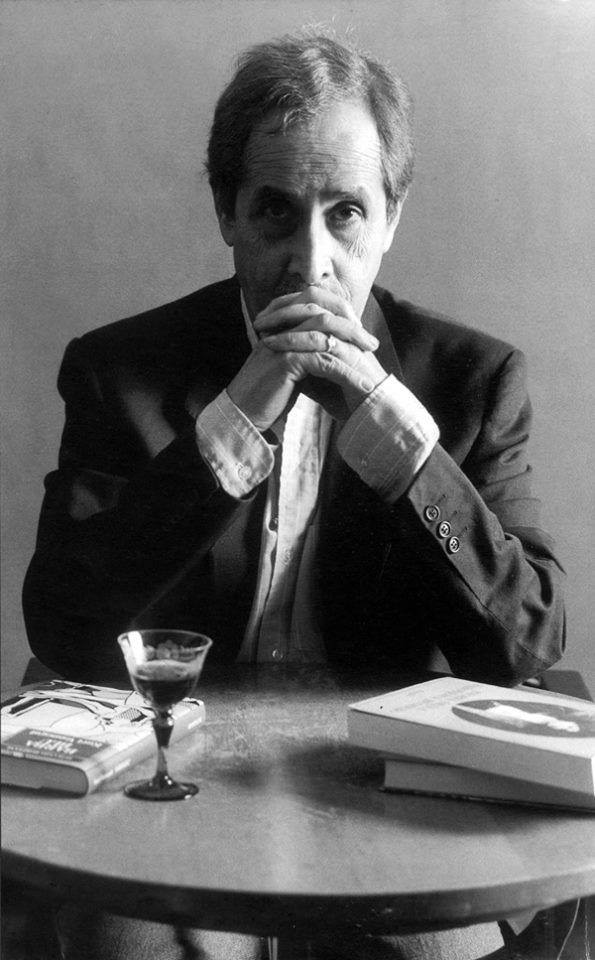
- Born: April 13, 1924; Lima, Peru
- Died: March 8, 2006 (aged 81); Milan, Italy
- Occupations: Artist, writer

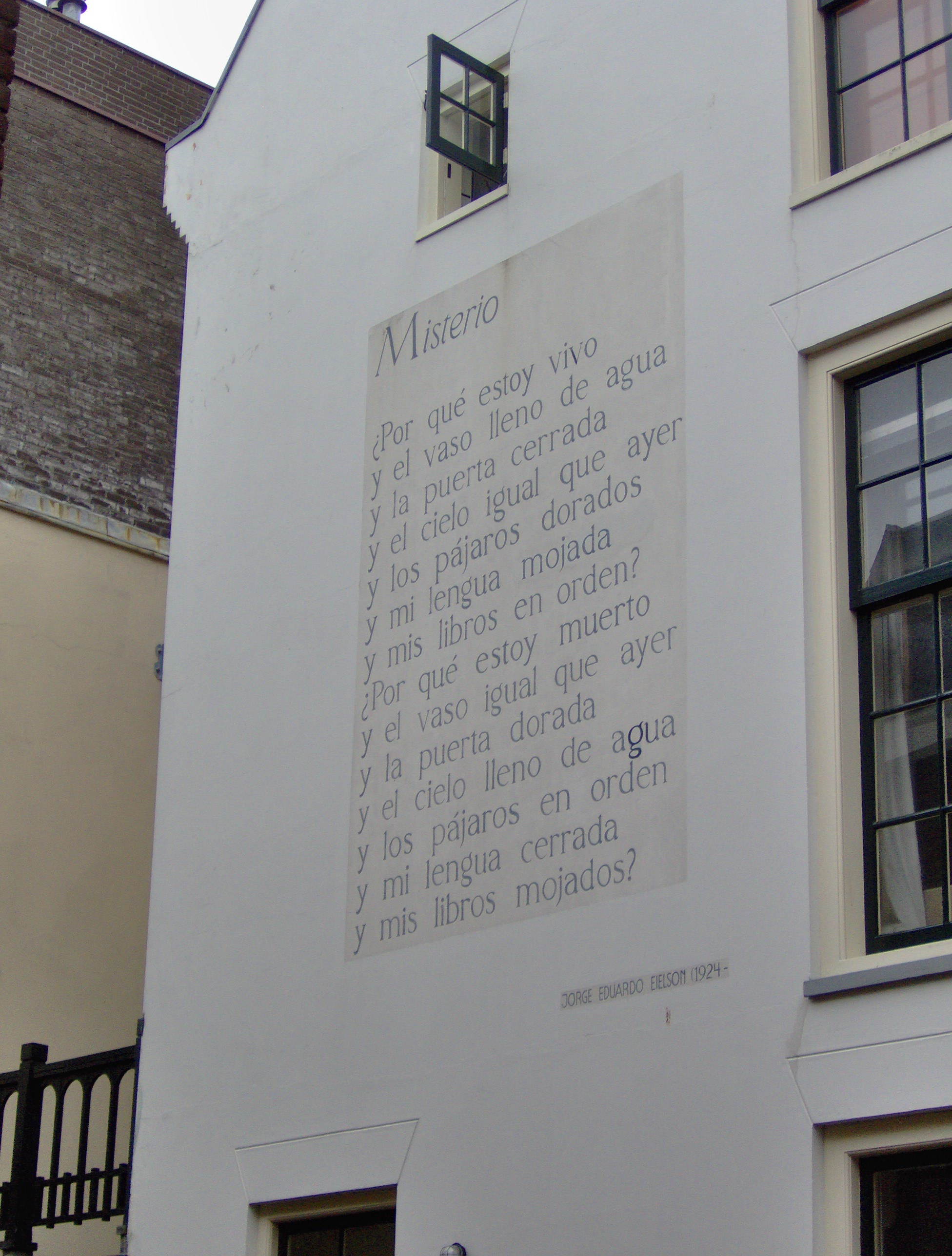
Eielson's poem Misterio on a house wall in Leiden, The Netherlands

Jorge Eduardo Eielson (April 13, 1924 – March 8, 2006) was a Peruvian artist and writer. As an artist, he is known for his quipus, a reinterpretation of an ancient Andean device; they are considered precursors of conceptual art.

== Life and career ==
Eielson was born in Lima. His father died when he was seven years old so he was raised by his mother. At a young age, he developed artistic tendencies: he played the piano, drew copiously and recited poetry. Eielson switched schools several times until at the end of his secondary education he met the anthropologist and writer José María Arguedas who introduced him to the artistic and literary circles of Lima as well as to the knowledge of the ancient civilizations of Peru. Eielson started studies at the National University of San Marcos in 1941. He won the National Poetry Award three years later and the National Drama Award in 1948, when he also held a successful art exhibition at the Lima Gallery .

In the same year, he traveled to Paris under a French government scholarship, in that city he exhibited at the Colette Allendy gallery before traveling to Switzerland thanks to a UNESCO scholarship. In 1951, he traveled to Italy for a summer vacation and decided to settle permanently in Rome. During this period he wrote the collection of poems Habitación en Roma and two novels: El cuerpo de Giulia-No and Primera muerte de María. In the late 1950s, he abandoned avant-garde and resorts to using materials such as earth, sand and clay to sculpt in the canvas surface; at first he uses this technique to depict landscapes but gradually moves towards human figures represented through clothing of various kinds. In 1963, he started his first quipu, reinventing this ancient Andean device with fabrics of brilliant colors, knotted and tied on canvas. Eielson's quipus were exhibited in the 1964 Venice Biennale to wide acclaim. In the mid-1970s, he traveled to Peru where he devoted himself to the study of pre-Columbian art; during this period, the Instituto Nacional de Cultura (National Institute of Culture) published most of his poetry under the title Poesía escrita. He received a Guggenheim Fellowship in 1978 for a lecture in New York.

Written works:

Poetry

- Reinos (1944)
- Canción y muerte de Rolando (1944 and 1959)
- Mutatis mutandis (1967)
- Poesía escrita (1976)
- Canto visible (1977)
- Noche oscura del cuerpo (1989)

Novel

- El cuerpo de Giulia-No (1971)
