= Enrique Iturriaga =

Peruvian composer and educator (1918–2019)

Enrique Iturriaga Romero
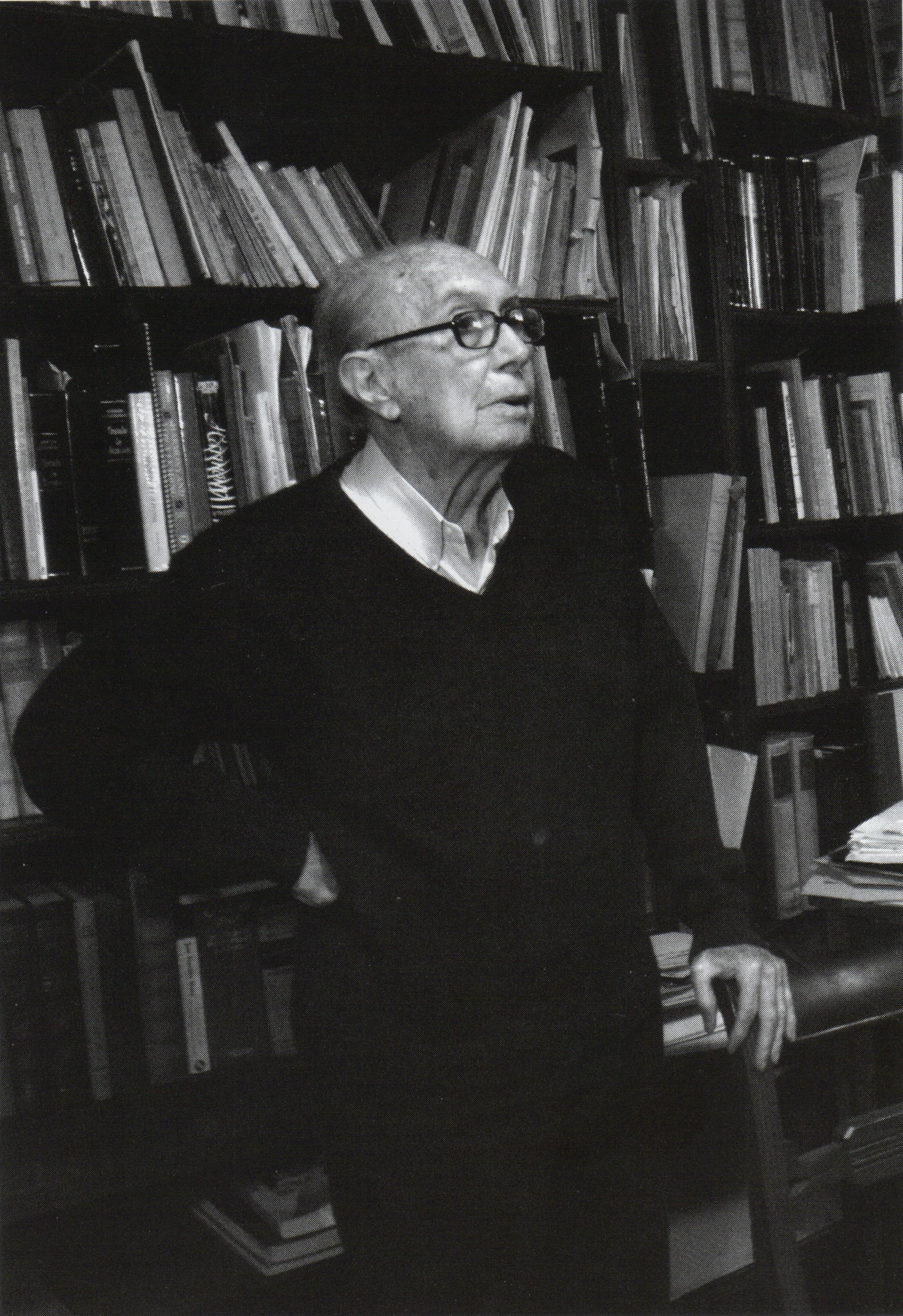
- Iturriaga in the library of the National Conservatory of Music of Peru, 2008.
- Born: April 3, 1918; Lima, Peru
- Died: 23 November 2019 (aged 101); Burlington, Vermont, US
- Occupations: Composer, Teacher
- Known for: general director of the National Conservatory of Music

Enrique Iturriaga Romero (April 3, 1918 – November 23, 2019) was a Peruvian composer and educator.

== Biography ==
Enrique Iturriaga Romero was born in Lima, Peru, in 1918 and spent most of his childhood in Huacho, a small port city north of the Peruvian capital. As a child, Iturriaga did not receive any formal musical training, but music was always present in the Iturriaga family house. His grandmother and older cousins often played the piano during family gatherings, arousing Enrique's interest in music from an early age, and was also encouraged by his father to play the piano. The young Iturriaga was naturally involved in music and enjoyed improvising on the piano; He also learned to play popular music like Peruvian waltz, marinera, tango, jazz, all by ear. Peruvian popular music not only played an important role in the development of Iturriaga's childhood, but also later shaped his musical creativity. In the coastal regions of Peru where he grew up, the most common type of popular music during the first half of the twentieth century was música criolla.

Although Iturriaga's exposure to music in his early years was predominantly that of popular idioms, the family's Victrola gramophone also gave him the opportunity to explore a selection of music and art. Due to the difficulties in properly recording piano and string instruments in acoustic and electrical recordings, most of the repertoire recorded in the 1920s consisted of short and arian songs, however, even the vocal recordings were as Poor quality that the singer's voice sounded like "horrendous scream" and the accompanying orchestra was almost inaudible. However, in an isolated environment, such as the city of Huacho, where Iturriaga spent his childhood, the opportunities for music concerts of different artistic angles are very rare, and as a result, Iturriaga could satisfy his curiosity for music art only by Gramophone use.

Iturriaga learned to play popular music with relative ease because of his keen ear, but was not interested in becoming a popular music artist; rather, it was the invention of original piano pieces that fascinated him most. However, I needed basic music training before I could start composition studies. In 1932, at the age of fourteen, he auditioned in Lima for Lily Rosay, piano teacher at the Sas-Rosay Academy of Music. Although he could not read music, Iturriaga presented an interpretation in C minor for Liszt's Hungarian Rhapsody No. 2 – original key is different – that he learned completely by ear.

Between 1934 and 1939 he studied piano with Lily Rosay and began studying theory and harmony with Andrés Sas. He enters the National University of San Marcos and studies in the faculty of letters, then leaves his studies to enter the National Conservatory of Music. There he would work with Rodolfo Holzmann from 1945 to 1950.

At the Conservatory he graduated as a composition teacher. In 1947, when he was still a student he won the Duncker Lavalle National Prize for his work Canción y muerte de Rolando for voice and orchestra, on a text by the poet Jorge Eduardo Eielson. He has formed an important number of Peruvian composers. He has been director of the National Conservatory of Music.

He was part of the group of Peruvian composers who in the 1950s renewed the art music of their country, through the introduction of new musical techniques and the improvement of musical work. In 1950 he traveled to France with a scholarship granted by the Government of that country. In Paris he took classes with Arthur Honegger.

Between 1953 and 1960 he was a music critic of the newspaper El Comercio in Lima.

In April 1957 he won the Juan Landaeta Prize for his work Suite for Orchestra, in the contest called by the second Latin American Festival in Caracas. That same year he was called as professor at the National Conservatory of Music.

In 1963 he traveled to the United States, invited to meet and study the work of universities and other higher institutions in the field of music. The same year he traveled to Santiago de Chile, invited by the University of Chile to attend the Inter-American Congress of Musical Educators.

In 1965, the committee for the third Ibero-American Festival in Washington, D.C., commissioned him with a symphonic work: Iturriaga composed Vivencias – four pieces for orchestra – which was premiered by Lukas Foss and the Buffalo Philharmonic Orchestra, New York.

Between 1973 and 1976 he was director of the National School of Music. In 1999 he was elected as general director of the National Conservatory of Music. He also served as a professor at the Pontifical Catholic University of Peru and the National University of San Marcos.

On November 23, 2019, the orchestral composer died at 101. The news was confirmed by the Gran Teatro Nacional del Perú.

== Works ==
His works are halfway between modernist and traditional tendencies, so in his works he mixes these styles alternately.

Among his most important works are Pregón y danza for piano, Sinfonía Junín y Ayacucho for symphony orchestra, Canción y muerte de Rolando for orchestra, Homenaje a Stravinski, for orchestra Cuatro poemas de Javier Heraud for voice and piano, Las cumbres for choir a capella, Vivencias – his only serial work – for orchestra, Preludio y fuga para un Santiago for brass, among others.

Iturriaga is part of a group of Peruvian composers formed by the German-born musician Rodolfo Holzmann. In addition to teaching and criticism, his dissemination work was expanded with the publication of the books La música en el Perú – in co-authorship – and Método de composición melódica.

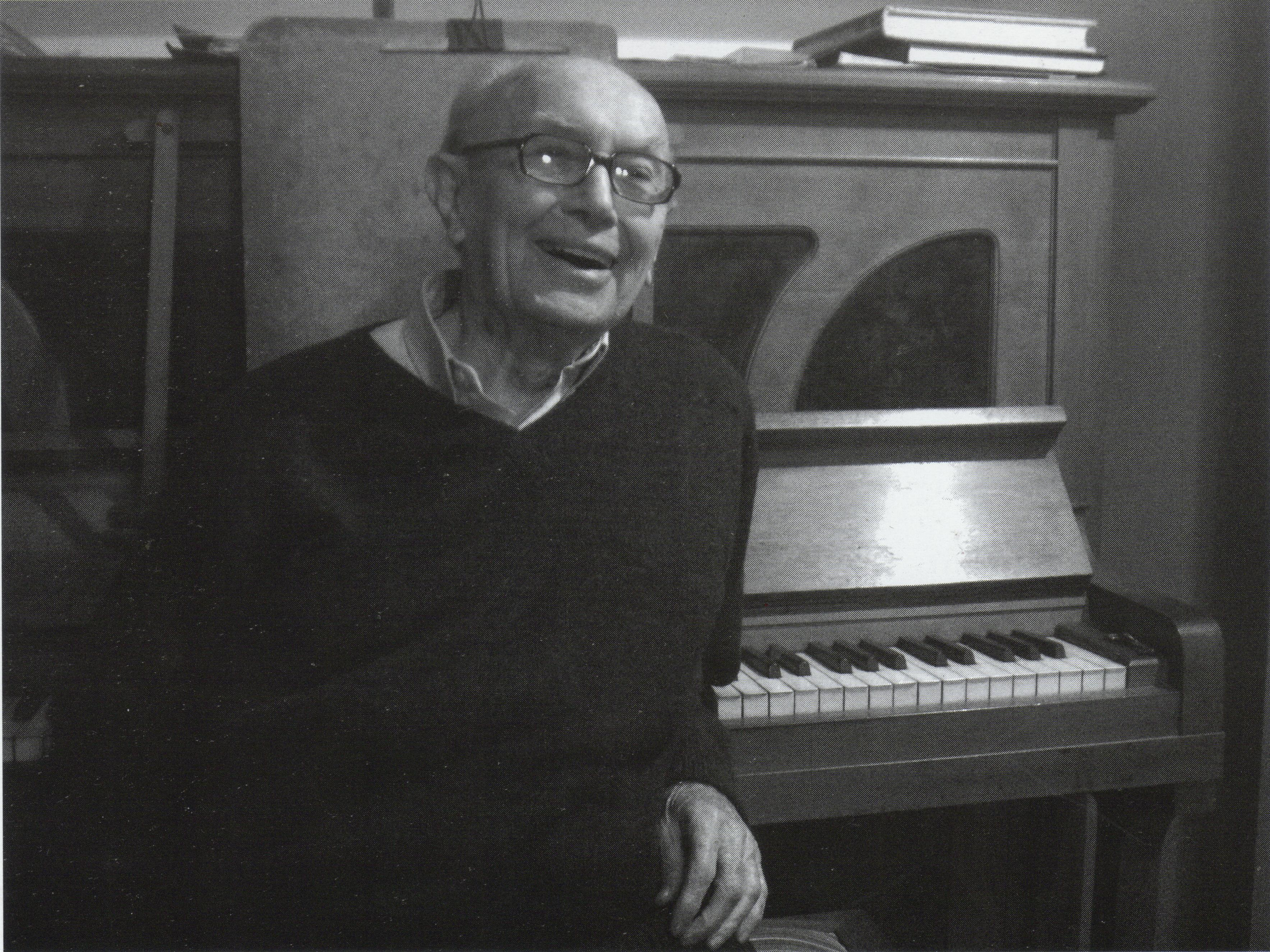
Enrique Iturriaga after a lesson at the National Conservatory of Music, 2008.

== Awards ==
Iturriaga garnered recognition early, when in 1947 he won the Dunker Lavalle Award for his work for voice and orchestra Canción y muerte de Rolando, inspired by the famous poem by Jorge Eduardo Eielson. He won the award again in 1971 with Homenaje a Stravinsky para orquesta y cajón solista.

In 1957 he won the Juan Landaeta Prize, Caracas; and in 1965, the Third Ibero-American Festival of Washington commissioned him with a work, "Vivencias", that was premiered by the Buffalo Symphony Orchestra.

In 2005 he was awarded the Medal of Honor of the Peruvian Culture of the National Institute of Culture of Peru.
