= Horse racing in Peru =

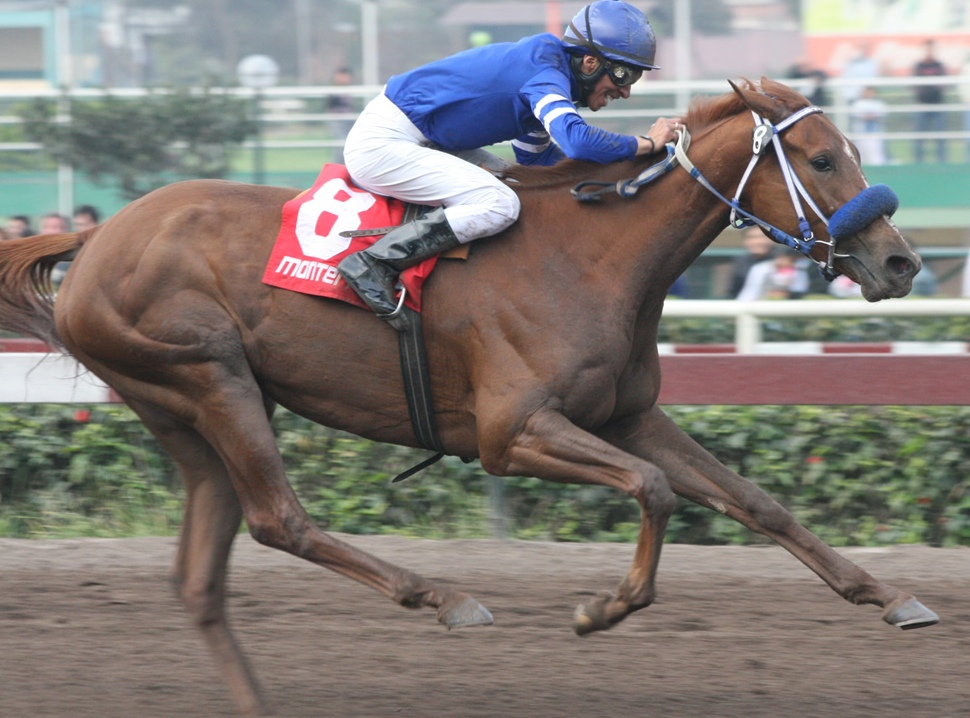
Almudena winning the 2010 Polla de Potrancas.

Horse racing (known in Spanish as "turf") is a popular equestrian sport in Peru. The history of the sport in the country dates back to the mid-19th century, when it was introduced by Peru's British community. Two major racecourses operate in the country, located in Monterrico and Arequipa.

In Peru, horse racing is administered by the Jockey Club del Perú (JCP), established in 1946, which serves as the central governing body. While turf tracks exist, dirt racing is the primary focus; signature events include the Derby Nacional, for three-year-olds, and the Gran Premio Jockey Club del Perú, for horses aged three and older.

== History ==
Horses were introduced to the continent during the Spanish colonization of the Americas, including the Spanish conquest of the Inca Empire by Francisco Pizarro.

=== 19th century ===
Horse racing in Peru dates back to the mid-19th century, when the sport was introduced by the local British community. The first public race in the country took place at the Cancha de la Mar Brava, located in Bellavista, on February 29, 1864. The event was supported and attended by colonel Miguel Medina, then prefect of Callao. A wooden tribune was built, limited by ropes, and the track was configured in the English style. The competition included a jump race and two races on a smooth, obstacle-free course, and the horses were Peruvian and Chilean, mixed with English stallions. The recurring events in Callao proved successful, and a second rudimentary track was built at the Pampa del Pino, today partially known as El Porvenir. A race was held in 1866, but the dangerous terrain forced its abandonment. It was succeeded by another racecourse in Chacra Colorada, known as the Cancha de Lima.

The Sociedad de Carreras del Perú, a racing association headed by Waldo Graña, was established in late 1871, and a permanent location was ultimately built in La Legua, the first such complex. The field was known as the "Cancha Meiggs" after Henry Meiggs, whose heirs donated the land, and operated from its inauguration on August 15, 1877 until 1902. It was originally known as the "Cancha de la Legua" due to its aforementioned location, near the Mirones estate. Important races were held on July 29–30. Outside of Lima and Callao, estate owners took an interest in horse breeding, notably in the haciendas of San José (Cañete) and Palo Seco (Chimbote). Civilian life was interrupted in April 1879 by the War of the Pacific, and the two civil wars that followed, the latter of which concluded in 1895. Following this period, activities continued, with more horses being brought from England and other locations.

The Jockey Club de Lima was established in 1895, replacing the society founded in 1871. Its first president was lawyer Ricardo Ortiz de Zevallos y Tagle. The club made efforts at the end of the century to acquire a location for a new, modern racecourse. At the end of the 19th century, a 99-year emphyteusis concession was obtained from the municipal government for the lands of the Santa Beatriz estate. These efforts concluded on June 11, 1903, when the Hipódromo de Santa Beatriz was inaugurated. Then-politician Augusto B. Leguía had been among the racetrack's promoters, also popularising the place bet among local women.

=== 20th century ===
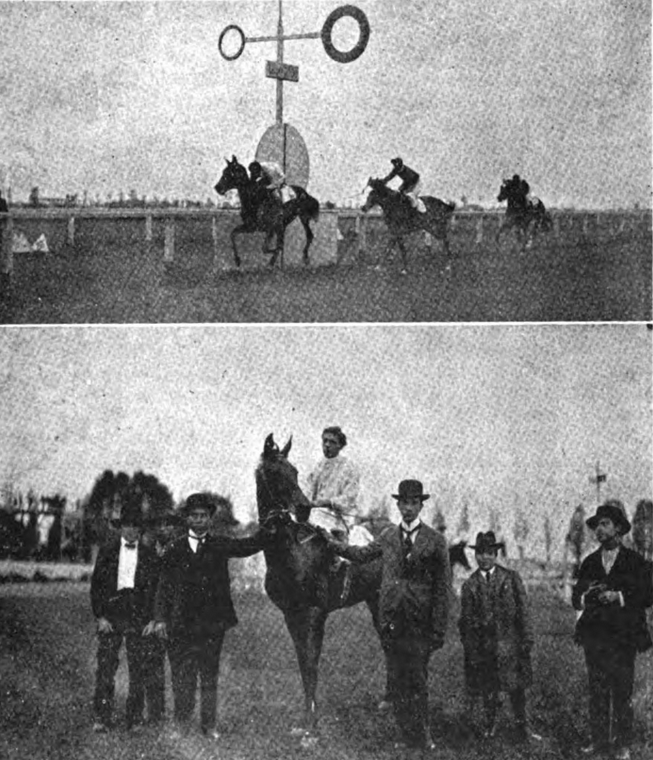
The 1915 Derby Nacional.

The hippodrome in Santa Beatriz's first tribune was built in the Moorish Revival style through the efforts of Alfredo Benavides Diez-Canseco, and a second tribune was built in 1909. The 1921–1924 period was Santa Beatriz's golden era, at the end of which a 2,400-metre (7,900 ft) track and another tribune for associates (the only remaining structure) was also built in land donated by Leguía. Races commemorating the Centennial of the Independence of Peru were held in their respective years, as was an event commemorating general Roque Sáenz Peña in 1905. In response to its popularity, an avenue was built to connect Bolognesi Square with the hippodrome, eventually known as Guzmán Blanco. The track was reduced in size to 1,600 metres (5,200 ft) following the 1930 Peruvian coup d'état, and the racecourse was shut down in 1938 due to Lima's ongoing urban growth.

Following talks between Club President Enrique Ayulo Pardo and Head of State Óscar R. Benavides, another racecourse was built at San Felipe, an estate adjacent to the newly-inaugurated Salaverry Avenue, and operational for the remaining duration of the 99-year concession. Known as the Hipódromo de San Felipe, it was inaugurated on December 4, 1938. A breeders' association, the "Asociación de Criadores de Caballos de Carrera del Perú" (ACCCP), was established on April 8, 1950, with Ernesto Ayulo Pardo serving as its foundational president.

The Jockey Club del Perú (JCP) was established on April 4, 1946. At the time, it continued to function at San Felipe. In 1951, plans began to build a new racecourse began, as San Felipe's capacity was insufficient for the ever-growing popularity of horse racing in Peru. Security was also considered, as a group stopped a race by invading the track and hurling rocks on November 30, 1952. A 110-hectare (270-acre) terrain in Santiago de Surco was acquired by the board of directors in 1955, and construction of the new premises began immediately, concluding in 1960.

That same year, San Felipe held its last race, and the new racecourse—Hipódromo de Monterrico—became operational on December 18, at the time the most modern in South America. Week End was the first race's winning horse. On February 17, 1966, the recreation center was inaugurated, replacing the old central premises at Belén Street. Notable races held in San Felipe included the 1952 "Gran Premio Internacional Presidente de la República del Perú" and the 1959 "Jockey Club del Perú."

=== 21st century ===
On December 21, 2019, eight unknown assailants broke into the facilities owned by the Haras Barlovento, the oldest stud farm in the country, located at the 127th kilometre of the country's Southern Pan-American Highway, in Cañete. The group wounded the farm's security guard and killed four stallions (Kung Fu Mambo, Timely Advice, Cyrus Alexander and The Lieutenant), also stealing medications and a generator. The farm announced its closure later that week.

Lima's racecourse has a seating capacity for about 25,000 people, and serves as a venue for several events, including concerts. In Arequipa, the racecourse has a capacity of over 1,000. Unlike the one in Lima, it was built in 2009, replacing its historical predecessor, which was later demolished.

== Racecourses ==
- Hipódromo de Monterrico, located in Santiago de Surco, Lima. Opened in 1961 and operated by the Jockey Club del Perú. It features both turf and dirt tracks.
- Hipódromo de Arequipa, located in Cerro Colorado, Arequipa. Operated by the Jockey Club de Arequipa.

=== Former ===
- Hipódromo de Santa Beatriz, located in Lima. Opened in 1903 and replaced by the Campo de Marte park.
- Hipódromo de San Felipe, located in Lima. Replaced the former and operated until 1961, after which it was replaced by a residential complex.
- Hipódromo de Santa Victoria, located in Chiclayo. Inactive due to flood damage in 2006 and demolished in 2026. Operated by the Jockey Club de Chiclayo, which continues to function.
- Hipódromo de Porongoche, located in Arequipa. Opened in 1924 and functioned until 2008.

== Important races and meetings ==
Four graded stakes dirt races for 3-year-olds comprise the Peruvian Quadruple Crown:

1. Clásico Polla de Potrillos (GI; colts) and Clásico Polla de Potrancas (GII; fillies) - September, dirt, 1,600 metres. The latter is held on the fifth week of August.
2. Clásico Ricardo Ortiz de Zevallos (GII; colts) and Clásico Enrique Ayulo Pardo (GII; fillies) - October, dirt, 2,000 metres.
3. Clásico Derby Nacional (GI) - Held on the first week of November. Dirt, 2,400 metres.
4. Gran Premio Nacional Augusto B. Leguía (GI) - February, turf, 2,600 metres (Over 2,800 m in 2024). Named after JCP founder Augusto B. Leguía. Held on the second week of December.

Other major races include:

- Clásico Enrique Ayulo Pardo: G2. 3-year-old fillies. Dirt, 2,000 m.
- Gran Premio Latinoamericano: G1. Hosted on a rotating basis among Chile, Brazil, Uruguay, Argentina, and Peru.
- Clásico Jockey Club del Perú: G1. 3-year-olds and up. Dirt, 2,400 m. Held on the fourth week of June.
- Clásico Pamplona: G1. 3-year-old and up fillies/mares. Turf, 2,000 m. Named after renowned Peruvian mare Pamplona. Held on the fourth week of June.

== Notable Racehorses ==
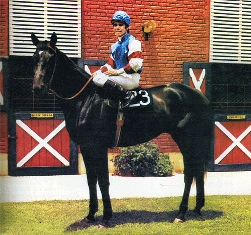
Undated photograph of Santorín.

- Grozny. Foaled in 1995, he won the Triple Crown. During his triple crown run, Grozny was owned by stud Temsa, trained by Fernando Chang, and ridden by David Cora.
- Pamplona. The only filly in Peruvian history to win four major classic races. She also competed in the Gran Premio Carlos Pellegrini, finishing third. After retiring, she became a broodmare in the United States; her offspring included Pampered Miss, winner of the French 1000 Guineas, and Empery, winner of the Epsom Derby. Empery was later imported to Japan as a stallion.
- Rio Pallanga. Foaled in 1952, he won the Triple Crown undefeated and secured ten domestic graded stakes victories. However, he was euthanized following an injury sustained during a race. He is considered the greatest racehorse in Peruvian history.
- Santorín – Active in the 1970s, he won four major titles: the Polla de Potrillos, the Gran Premio Ricardo Ortiz de Zevallos, the Derby Nacional, and the Gran Premio Nacional Augusto B. Leguía. He also traveled to Argentina to compete in the Gran Premio Carlos Pellegrini, becoming the first Peruvian horse to win the race.

== See also ==
- Sport in Peru
