= Super Nao =

Peruvian Thoroguhbred racehorse

- Sire: Super Saver
- Grandsire: Maria's Mon
- Dam: Royal Top
- Damsire: Giant's Causeway
- Sex: Stallion
- Foaled: October 7, 2018
- Country: Peru
- Colour: Bay
- Breeder: Haras Firmamento
- Owner: Stud Ju Ya
- Record: 9: 4–1–1
- Earnings: S/92,385

Major wins
- Clásico Polla de Potrillos (2021); Clásico Ricardo Ortiz de Zevallos (2021); Derby Nacional (2021); Clásico Alfredo Benavides y Alfredo Benavides Diez Canseco (2022)

Awards
- Peruvian Horse of the Year (2021); Peruvian Champion Dirt Three-Year-Old Colt (2021)

Super Nao (7 Oct 2018–) is an Argentine-bred, Peruvian-trained Thoroughbred racehorse best known for winning the Peruvian Triple Crown in 2021.

== Background ==
Super Nao is a bay stallion with a star and right hind coronet that was bred by Haras Firmamento.

Super Saver, Super Nao's sire, won the Grade 1 Kentucky Derby and had a record as a successful sire, with his progeny including Grade 1 winners Runhappy, Letruska, and Happy Saver. Super Nao's dam Royal Top was a winner in Argentina who produced the Peruvian Champion Turf Mare Reina de Mollendo the year before Super Nao, as well as stakes-placed runners Royal Top Sea and Reina Estrellita.

During his career, Super Nao was campaigned by Stud Ju Ya owned by Juan Sun Han and trained by Alfonso Arias Rodríguez. Alfonso described Super Nao as very sound and very agreeable.

== Racing career ==
Super Nao ran twice as a 2-year-old, finishing third in the listed Clásico Luis Olaechea Du Bois before winning a conditional race. He ran in the listed Clásico Hipódromo de San Felipe in his first race as a three-year-old before contesting the first leg of the Peruvian Triple Crown.

Super Nao started in the Polla de Potrillos as a long-shot, but won the race, defeating Eliitas and Peruvian two-year-old champion Sorpresivo. A month later, Super Nao also won the second leg of the Peruvian Triple Crown, the Clásico Ricardo Ortiz de Zevallos.

In the Derby Nacional Super Nao took the lead from the start and led the all way to a wire-to-wire win in a final time of 2:34.4, winning the Peruvian Triple Crown.

Super Nao was named the Peruvian Horse of the Year and Champion Dirt Three-Year-Old Colt for his 2021 campaign.

In 2022, Super Nao ran poorly in the Group 2 Clásico Ciudad de Lima, losing to the older Nuremberg. The next month, the two faced each other again in the Group 3 Clásico Alfredo Benavides y Alfredo Benavides Diez Canseco run over 2000 meters, and Super Nao won.

Super Nao was selected as one of the Peruvian representatives for the 2022 Gran Premio Latinoamericano based on his win in the Group 3 Clásico Benavides y Alfredo Benavides Diez Canseco.

While training for the Group 1 Clásico Jockey Club del Perú, Super Nao suffered a tendon injury that resulted in his retirement.

== Racing statistics ==
Date	Age	Distance	Surface	Race	Grade	Track	Odds	Field	Finish	Time	Winning (Losing) margin	Jockey	Ref
May 22, 2021	2	1400 meters	Dirt	Clásico Luis Olaechea Du Bois	Listed	Hipódromo de Monterrico		6	3	1:27.35	(9 lengths)	M. Vilcarima	
Jun 18, 2021	2	1200 meters	Dirt	Condicional	Conditional	Hipódromo de Monterrico	6.40	8	1	1:13.74	1 1/2 lengths	M. Vilcarima	
Jul 25, 2021	3	1600 meters	Dirt	Clásico Hipódromo de San Felipe	Listed	Hipódromo de Monterrico		7	2	1:40.51	2 lengths	R. Melgarejo	
Sep 12, 2021	3	1600 meters	Dirt	Clásico Polla de Potrillos - Roberto Alvarez Calderón Rey	GI	Hipódromo de Monterrico	58.40	9	1	1:38.6	2 1/4 lengths	J. Reyes	
Oct 10, 2021	3	2000 meters	Dirt	Clásico Ricardo Ortiz de Zevallos	GI	Hipódromo de Monterrico	7.20	9	1	2:08.80	1 1/2 lengths	J. Reyes	
Nov 21, 2021	3	2400 meters	Dirt	Derby Nacional	GI	Hipódromo de Monterrico	3.40	10	1	2:34.85	6 lengths	J. Reyes	
Jan 16, 2022	3	2000 meters	Dirt	Clásico Ciudad de Lima	GII	Hipódromo de Monterrico		6	6	2:06.95	(12 1/2 lengths)	J. Reyes	
Feb 20, 2022	3	2000 meters	Dirt	Clásico Benavides y Alfredo Benavides Diez Canseco	GIII	Hipódromo de Monterrico	6.80	11	1	2:07.12	5 lengths	J. Reyes	
Apr 2, 2022	3	2000 meters	Dirt	Gran Premio Latinoamericano	GI	Hipódromo Chile	12.00	14	6	2:03.63	(16 1/4 lengths)	J. Reyes	

== Stud career ==
Super Nao entered stud in 2022 at Haras Rancho Fatima.

== Pedigree ==
Pedigree of Super Nao (ARG), bay stallion, foaled October 7, 2018
Sire Super Saver (USA) 2007	Maria's Mon (USA); 1993	Wavering Monarch (USA)	Majestic Light (USA)
Sire Super Saver (USA) 2007	Maria's Mon (USA); 1993	Wavering Monarch (USA)	Uncommitted (USA)
Sire Super Saver (USA) 2007	Maria's Mon (USA); 1993	Carlotta Maria (USA)	Caro (IRE)
Sire Super Saver (USA) 2007	Maria's Mon (USA); 1993	Carlotta Maria (USA)	Water Malone (USA)
Sire Super Saver (USA) 2007	Supercharger (USA); 1995	A.P. Indy (USA)	Seattle Slew (USA)
Sire Super Saver (USA) 2007	Supercharger (USA); 1995	A.P. Indy (USA)	Weekend Surprise (USA)
Sire Super Saver (USA) 2007	Supercharger (USA); 1995	Get Lucky (USA)	Mr. Prospector (USA)
Sire Super Saver (USA) 2007	Supercharger (USA); 1995	Get Lucky (USA)	Dance Number (USA)
Dam Royal Top (ARG) 2009	Giant's Causeway (USA); 1997	Storm Cat (USA)	Storm Bird (CAN)
Dam Royal Top (ARG) 2009	Giant's Causeway (USA); 1997	Storm Cat (USA)	Terlingua (USA)
Dam Royal Top (ARG) 2009	Giant's Causeway (USA); 1997	Mariah's Storm (USA)	Rahy (USA)
Dam Royal Top (ARG) 2009	Giant's Causeway (USA); 1997	Mariah's Storm (USA)	Immense (USA)
Dam Royal Top (ARG) 2009	Royal Wave (USA); 2002	Royal Academy (USA)	Nijinsky (CAN)
Dam Royal Top (ARG) 2009	Royal Wave (USA); 2002	Royal Academy (USA)	Crimson Saint (USA)
Dam Royal Top (ARG) 2009	Royal Wave (USA); 2002	Wave On (USA)	Caveat (USA)
Dam Royal Top (ARG) 2009	Royal Wave (USA); 2002	Wave On (USA)	Hot Option (USA)
