= Grozny (horse) =

Peruvian racehorse

- Sire: Privato
- Grandsire: Danzig
- Dam: Lady Tere
- Damsire: Niobrara
- Sex: Stallion
- Foaled: May 19, 1995
- Country: Peru
- Colour: Grey
- Breeder: Haras Monterrico
- Owner: Stud Temsa (1997-1998); Stud RWK (2000)
- Trainer: Fernando Chang (1997-1998); Félix Banda (2000)
- Jockey: Edwin Talaverano (1997) David Coras (1998) Renzo Morales (2000)
- Record: 8: 7-0-0

Major wins
- G1 Polla de Potrillos G1 Clásico Ricardo Ortiz de Zevallos; G1 Derby Nacional; G2 Clásico Ernesto Ayulo Pardo; Clásico Manuel Quimper Clásico Perinox

Awards
- Peruvian Triple Crown (1998); Peruvian Horse of the Year (1998); Peruvian Champion Three-Year-Old Colt (1998)

Grozny (1995–2000) was a gray racehorse and Peruvian Triple Crown winner. He died in 2000. Trainer Fernando Chang considered Grozny the best horse he ever trained, and one of the best he ever saw. Assistant trainer Félix Banda also considered Grozny his best horse, and stated that he was fast and agile and always gave his all in a race. During his triple crown run, Grozny was owned by stud Temsa, trained by Fernando Chang, and ridden by David Cora.

== Background ==
Grozny was bred by Haras Monterrico, sired by Privato out of Lady Tere by Niobrara. His dam never won a race, and his pedigree was considered subpar. Grozny was purchased by stud Temsa in a package deal with a horse named Noah, then considered the more promising prospect.

== Racing career ==
Throughout his racing career, Grozny suffered from soundness issues and chronic leg pain, which made him a difficult horse to train and greatly limited the number of starts he was able to make. He would regularly remain in his stall with only walking exercise for over a week after a race, and his legs were regularly iced.

Grozny's first race was in a 1300 meter maiden, which he won by less than a length. Grozny came out of the race with a cannon bone injury, and thus did not run again at age two.

Grozny's three-year-old debut was in the listed stakes Clásico Manuel Quimper, which he won by a length and a half. Grozny again came out of the race sore, and required careful care and laser therapy to remain sound enough to run through the Triple Crown races. Grozny won the first two Triple Crown races, the Polla de Potrillos and the Clásico Ricardo Ortíz de Zevallos, running as joint entry with Palestino in the latter.

The Derby Nacional is considered the most important horse race in Peru, and Grozny's greatest victory. The joint entry of Grozny and Palestino was heavily favored in the race, with the filly Madame Equis being considered the greatest challenge. Madame Equis was considered the definitive champion filly of her generation, and came into the Derby Nacional after winning the Polla de Potrancas and running an atypically poor race in the Gran Premio Enrique Ayulo Pardo, the first two races of the Peruvian Fillies Triple Crown. Coming into the stretch, Madame Equis was in the lead and looked as if she would win, but in the final hundred meters, Grozny caught up to and passed the filly to win by a length and three quarters. The two were far ahead of Palestino, who finished third, over seventeen lengths behind Madame Equis. The time was 2:30 1/5, one of the fastest times since Peruvian champion Santorín.

Following the triple crown win, Grozny was entered in the Gran Premio Nacional Augusto B. Leguía, the final leg of the quadruple crown. His win the Derby Nacional had been a hard one, and Grozny had to rest even longer than he normally did afterwards before returning to work. Grozny didn't have any serious works before the race, coming in less prepared than trainer Fernando Chang wanted. In the race itself, Grozny handled the turf surface well, but started off much faster and closer to the front than he normally did, running very fast early fractions. Grozny ended up finishing seventh of eight, coming out of the race with a severe tendon injury in a front leg.

Due to the severity of the injury, Grozny was taken out of training and sent to Arequipa, in the old Hipódromo de Porongoche, for recuperation. After receiving treatment and rest there for several months, Grozny returned to race training at Hipódromo de Monterrico, now owned by Stud RWK and trained by Félix Banda. Grozny was eased back into work, but quickly showed that he was ready for a race. Grozny won the Clásico Perinox in his first race back, and came out of the race well. Two months later, Grozny returned to graded stakes company and won the G2 Clásico Ernesto Ayulo Pardo.

After the two wins, the plan was to bring Grozny to Chile and the Club Hípico de Santiago to race. Grozny put in several very fast works at Monterrico in preparation, but shortly before leaving, an x-ray revealed a sesamoid bone injury, which led to Grozny's retirement.

For his 1998 campaign, Grozny was named the Peruvian Horse of the Year and Champion Three-Year-Old Colt.

== Racing statistics ==
Grozny's Career Statistics
Date	Age	Surface	Distance	Race	Grade	Track	Time	Field	Finish	Margin	Jockey	Trainer	Owner
Sep 27, 1997	2		1300 meters	Premio Especial Salomón Manzur Mattar	Maiden	Hipódromo de Monterrico			1		Edwin Talaverano	Fernando Chang	Stud Temsa
Mar, 1998	3	Dirt	1500 meters	Clásico Manuel Quimper	Listed Stakes	Hipódromo de Monterrico	1:32 2/5	9	1	1 1/2 lengths	David Cora	Fernando Chang	Stud Temsa
Apr 26, 1998	3	Dirt	1600 meters	Polla de Potrillos	G1	Hipódromo de Monterrico	1:38 3/5	15	1	3 3/4 lengths	David Cora	Fernando Chang	Stud Temsa
May 31, 1998	3	Dirt	2000 meters	Clásico Ricardo Ortíz de Zevallos	G1	Hipódromo de Monterrico	2:04 4/5	10	1	2 3/4 lengths	David Cora	Fernando Chang	Stud Temsa
Jun 28, 1998	3	Dirt	2400 meters	Derby Nacional	G1	Hipódromo de Monterrico	2:30 1/5	10	1	1 3/4 lengths	David Cora	Fernando Chang	Stud Temsa
Aug 30, 1998	3	Turf	2800 meters	Gran Premio Nacional Augusto B. Leguía	G1	Hipódromo de Monterrico	2:52 1/5	8	7	(30 lengths)	David Cora	Fernando Chang	Stud Temsa
Feb 6, 2000	5	Dirt	1500 meters	Clásico Perinox	Ungraded Stakes	Hipódromo de Monterrico			1	2 lengths	Renzo Morales	Félix Banda	Stud RWK
Apr 10, 2000	5	Dirt	2100 meters	Clásico Ernesto Ayulo Pardo	G2	Hipódromo de Monterrico	2:12		1	2 lengths	Renzo Morales	Félix Banda	Stud RWK

== Retirement and death ==
After sustaining his sesamoid bone injury, Grozny was retired to stand at stud. Before his first breeding season, Grozny hit his head in his stall, supposedly during a fit brought on by the departure of the mare in the next stall. The hit caused a blood clot to develop in Grozny's head, causing life-threatening seizures. Fifteen days after the accident, Grozny suffered a cardiac arrest that ended his life.

== Legacy ==
The Clásico Grozny, a 1500 meter ungraded race restricted to Peruvian-bred three-year-olds, is named after Grozny.

== Pedigree ==
Pedigree of Grozny (PER), grey stallion, foaled May 19, 1995
Sire Privato (USA) 1985	Danzig (USA); 1977	Northern Dancer (CAN)	Nearctic (CAN)
Sire Privato (USA) 1985	Danzig (USA); 1977	Northern Dancer (CAN)	Natalma (USA)
Sire Privato (USA) 1985	Danzig (USA); 1977	Pas de Nom (USA)	Admiral's Voyage (USA)
Sire Privato (USA) 1985	Danzig (USA); 1977	Pas de Nom (USA)	Petitioner (GB)
Sire Privato (USA) 1985	La Atrevida (USA); 1977	Bold Bidder (USA)	Bold Ruler (USA)
Sire Privato (USA) 1985	La Atrevida (USA); 1977	Bold Bidder (USA)	High Bid (USA)
Sire Privato (USA) 1985	La Atrevida (USA); 1977	Santa Quilla (FR)	Sanctus (FR)
Sire Privato (USA) 1985	La Atrevida (USA); 1977	Santa Quilla (FR)	Neriad (USA)
Dam Lady Tere (PER) 1989	Niobrara (USA); 1978	In Reality (USA)	Intentionally (USA)
Dam Lady Tere (PER) 1989	Niobrara (USA); 1978	In Reality (USA)	My Dear Girl (USA)
Dam Lady Tere (PER) 1989	Niobrara (USA); 1978	Fazenda (ARG)	Dancing Moss (GB)
Dam Lady Tere (PER) 1989	Niobrara (USA); 1978	Fazenda (ARG)	Fallow (IRE)
Dam Lady Tere (PER) 1989	Greek Pleasure (PER); 1984	Prince Pleasure (USA)	What a Pleasure (USA)
Dam Lady Tere (PER) 1989	Greek Pleasure (PER); 1984	Prince Pleasure (USA)	Lady Whileaway (USA)
Dam Lady Tere (PER) 1989	Greek Pleasure (PER); 1984	Greek Legend (PER)	Collide (USA)
Dam Lady Tere (PER) 1989	Greek Pleasure (PER); 1984	Greek Legend (PER)	Jive Girl (USA)
