= Derby Nacional =

Peruvian stakes race for thoroughbreds; part of the Quadruple Crown

- Class: Grade I
- Location: Hipódromo de Monterrico; Santiago de Surco, Lima, Peru
- Inaugurated: 1903
- Race type: Thoroughbred - Flat racing
- Website: www.jcp.org.pe

Race information
- Distance: 2,400 meters (11.93 furlongs)
- Surface: Dirt
- Track: Left-handed
- Qualification: 3-year-old
- Weight: Assigned
- Purse: S/. 51,200

The Derby Nacional (lit. 'National Derby') (Note: Also known as the Clásico Derby Nacional.) is a Peruvian Grade I stakes race run at the Hipódromo de Monterrico in Santiago de Surco, Lima. The race is run by three-year-old Thoroughbreds at a distance of approximately 1 1/2 miles (11.93 furlongs; 2,400 meters).

Held annually in late November or early December, the Derby is the third leg of the Quadruple Crown. Known as the cinta azul, it is one of the sport's most prestigious races at a national level, and is also described as the most important. The event dates back to 1903, when it was first inaugurated at the historic Hipódromo de Santa Beatriz. The dirt race attracts members of the country's high society, and is also accompanied by a festival.

== History ==
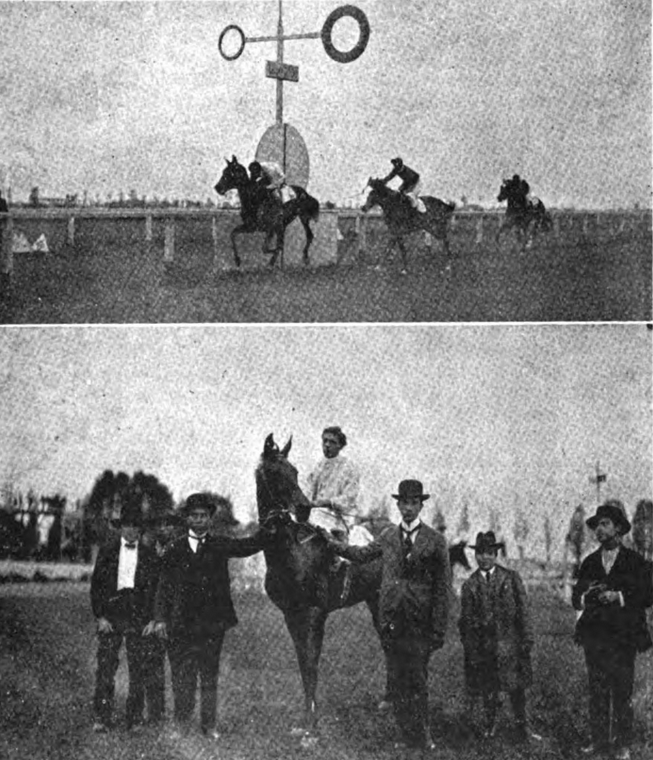
Hércules winning the 1915 Derby (top) and the aftermath (bottom).

The race was inaugurated in 1903 at Hipódromo de Santa Beatriz, for two- and three-year-olds bred in Peru, run over a distance of 1200 meters. The next year, the race was restricted to three-year-olds only.

In 1940, the race moved to the Hipódromo de San Felipe, where it ran until 1961 when it was moved to its present location at the Hipódromo de Monterrico.

The race was originally restricted to Peruvian-bred horses only.

In 1908, jockey Frank Guiturriz fell off of the prohibitive favorite Orquida, who was owned by then-president of Peru, Augusto B. Leguía. This left Turf to win the race. Guiturriz, as well as Turf's trainer, John Casella, and jockey, R. Díaz, were arrested under suspicion that Guiturriz had fallen off intentionally in order to throw the race. Guiturriz was later ruled off the turf for life.

By 1914, the Derby Nacional was considered the most important race in the Peruvian racing calendar.

The 1995 edition brought out a record attendance of 50,000 people.

== Records ==
Speed record (since 2003):

- 2:32.55 – Nieto Mireyo (2015)

Largest winning margin (since 2007):

- 10 3/4 lengths – Fly Lexis Fly (2011)

Most wins by a jockey:

- 7 – Antonio Vásquez (1951, 1953, 1956, 1957, 1959, 1960)

Most wins by a trainer:

- 9 – Ambrossio Malnatti (1920, 1935, 1949, 1953, 1954, 1956, 1957, 1959, 1960)

Most wins by an owner:

- 6 – Barlovento Stud (1963, 1968, 1970, 1973, 1974, 1976)
- 4 – Stud Doña Licha (2011, 2012, 2016, 2025)

== Winners ==
The winners of the Derby Nacional are listed as follows:

ƒ Indicates a filly

* In 1948 there was a dead heat for first place.

| Year | Winner | Jockey | Trainer | Owner | Breeder | Time | Margin | Distance | Ref |
|---|---|---|---|---|---|---|---|---|---|
| 2025 | Khamal | G. Calvente | Rómulo R. Herrera V. | Stud Doña Licha | Haras Jockey | 2:37.20 | 8 1/4 lengths | 2400 meters | |
| 2024 | Magic Power | Huber Bocanegra | Juan Diego Gonzales-Vigil | Valle Sagrado | Haras San Pablo | 2:35.91 | 3 lengths | 2400 meters | |
| 2023 | Poseidon | Edwin Talaverano | Juan Suarez Villarroel | Pedro Solari | Haras Rancho Fátima | 2:34.47 | 1/2 length | 2400 meters | |
| 2022 | Paradigma | Esvin Requejo | Juan Suarez Villarroel | Stud Black Label | Haras San Pablo | 2:35.79 | 3/4 length | 2400 meters | |
| 2021 | Super Nao | José Reyes | Alfonso Arias | Ju-Ya | Haras Firmamento | 2:34.85 | 6 lengths | 2400 meters | |
| 2020 | Novillero | Martín Chuan | Juan Suarez Villarroel | Stud Black Label | Haras Rancho Sur | 2:36.88 | Nose | 2400 meters | |
| 2019 | Barón Rojo | Edwin Talaverano | Jorge Salas | Unicornio | Haras Gina Santa Rosa | 2:37.00 | 4 lengths | 2400 meters | |
| 2018 | Ancelotti | Edwin Talaverano | Alfonso Arias | Voghera | Haras San Pablo | 2:37.54 | 1 3/4 lengths | 2400 meters | |
| 2017 | Golden Leaf | Martín Chuan | Juan Suarez Villarroel | Starbucks | Haras La Quebrada | 2:35.97 | 3 3/4 lengths | 2400 meters | |
| 2016 | Huracán Américo | Miguel Vilcarima | Arturo Morales | Stud Doña Licha | Dr. K. K. Jayaraman & Dr. V. Devi Jayaraman | 2:34.37 | 2 1/2 lengths | 2400 meters | |
| 2015 | Nieto Mireyo | José Monteza | Juan Suarez Villarroel | Cateluca | Haras Los Azahares | 2:32.55 | 1/2 length | 2400 meters | |
| 2014 | Liberal | Iván Quispe | Camilo Traverso II | The Fathers | Haras Los Azahares | 2:36.22 | 3/4 length | 2400 meters | |
| 2013 | Camilín Camilón | Martín Chuan | Juan Suarez Villarroel | Cateluca | Haras El Catorce | 2:38.22 | 1 length | 2400 meters | |
| 2012 | Kung Fu Mambo | Carlos Javier Herrera | Arturo Morales | Stud Doña Licha | Haras Futuro S.R.L. | 2:32 3/5 | 5 3/4 lengths | 2400 meters | |
| 2011 | Fly Lexis Fly | Carlos Javier Herrera | Arturo Morales | Stud Doña Licha | Haras Eco | 2:32 4/5 | 10 3/4 lengths | 2400 meters | |
| 2010 | Fahed Jr | Edwin Talaverano | Félix Banda | Stud Soribel | Haras Gina Santa Rosa | 2:36 2/5 | 1/2 length | 2400 meters | |
| 2009 | Koko Mambo | Carlos Javier Herrera | Juan Suarez Villarroel | Stud Black Label | Haras San Pablo | 2:35 3/5 | 5 3/4 lengths | 2400 meters | |
| 2008 | Lady Shatzi ƒ | Ivan Quispe | Sabino Arias | Stud Altamar | Haras San Pablo | 2:35 2/5 | 1/2 length | 2400 meters | |
| 2007 | Tomcito | Benjamin Padilla | Juan V. Suárez | Stud Jet Set | Chesapeake Farm & Darley | 2:35 2/5 | 3 1/2 lengths | 2400 meters | |
| 2006 | Muller | Victor Fernandez | Augusto Olivares | Stud El Catorce | Haras La Quebrada | 2:36.57 | | 2400 meters | |
| 2005 | Fletcher | Carlos Trujillo | Jorge Salas | Myrna | | 2:33 4/5 | | 2400 meters | |
| 2004 | Nicolas | Juan R. Torres | Jorge Toutín | Stud Thani | | 2:38 4/5 | | 2400 meters | |
| 2003 | La Sami ƒ | Carlos Hernández | Juan V. Suárez | H. Rancho Fátima | | 2:37 | | 2400 meters | |
| 2002 | Kiana ƒ | Edwin Talaverano | Félix Banda | Gloria | | | | 2400 meters | |
| 2001 | Shawshank | Benjamin Padilla | Carlos Gastañeta | T.K. | | | | 2400 meters | |
| 2000 | Sharaf | Renzo Morales | Félix Banda | R.W.K. | | | | 2400 meters | |
| 1999 | Batuka ƒ | Pablo Falero | Carlos Gastañeta | Jones-Falhgren | | | | 2400 meters | |
| 1998 | Grozny | David Cora | Fernando Chang | Temsa | | 2:30 1/5 | | 2400 meters | |
| 1997 | Capitan Garfio | José Sierra | Jaime Fuchs | Haras Santa María | | 2:35.61 | | 2400 meters | |
| 1996 | Kamel | Manuel Aguilar | Miguel Drago | Temsa | | | | 2400 meters | |
| 1995 | Quicklift | David Cora | Carlos Gastañeta | Carl J | | | | 2400 meters | |
| 1994 | Janfranco | Luis Ranilla | Camilo Traverso | Gina | | | | 2400 meters | |
| 1993 | Tia Gigi ƒ | Pedro Cerón | Camilo Traverso | Angela Silvia | | | | 2400 meters | |
| 1992 | Stash | Adolfo Morales | Eduardo Pianezzi | Azul Marino | | | | 2400 meters | |
| 1991 | Musicale | Christian Aragón | Juan Arriagada | Haras Santa María | | | | 2400 meters | |
| 1990 | Mari July ƒ | Luis Gonzáles | Augusto Soto | Gina | | | | 2400 meters | |
| 1989 | That Police | E. Herrera | Miguel Salas II | Los Haras | | 2:33 3/5 | | 2400 meters | |
| 1988 | El Duce | Yuri Yuranga | Jorge Salas | San Miguel | | | | 2400 meters | |
| 1987 | Clochard | M. Becerra | Alfonso Arias | FFLV | | 2:34 | | 2400 meters | |
| 1986 | Mi Colorao | Arturo Morales | J. Morales | Mi Laurita | | | | 2400 meters | |
| 1985 | Ophyusca ƒ | Luis Gonzáles | Jorge Salas | Linhanyen | | | | 2400 meters | |
| 1984 | Galeno | Pedro Cerón | Luis Melgar | Nancy | | | | 2400 meters | |
| 1983 | Furioso | P. Mendoza | Miguel Arteta | Delta | | | | 2400 meters | |
| 1982 | Piggot | Aníbal Prado | Miguel Arteta | San Juan | | | | 2400 meters | |
| 1981 | Don Ramón | Melanio Rojas | Juan V. Suárez | Notre Dame | | | | 2400 meters | |
| 1980 | Lady Embassy ƒ | Arnaldo Unsihuay | Juan Suárez | Santa Marina | | | | 2400 meters | |
| 1979 | Vaduz | Gonzalo Rojas | José Valenzuela | Couet | | | | 2400 meters | |
| 1978 | Morada Y Oro ƒ | Guillermo Herrera | Juan Suárez | Moradito | | | | 2400 meters | |
| 1977 | Profesor | Juan Castellanos | A. Miranda | Salva | | | | 2400 meters | |
| 1976 | Le Vodkatine | Arturo Morales | Juan Suárez | Stud Barlovento | | | | 2400 meters | |
| 1975 | Asombro | Antonio Aburto | Juan Suárez | Monty | | 2:34 2/5 | | 2400 meters | |
| 1974 | Primero de Mayo | José Valdivia | Juan Suárez | Stud Barlovento | | | | 2400 meters | |
| 1973 | Santorín | Arturo Morales | Juan Suárez | Stud Barlovento | | 2:30 | | 2400 meters | |
| 1972 | Rascal | Arturo Morales | Luis Palma | Recta Final | | | | 2400 meters | |
| 1971 | Rafael | Sergio Vera | C. Pianezzi | Tania | | | | 2400 meters | |
| 1970 | Palatino | Gonzalo Rojas | Juan Suárez | Stud Barlovento | | | | 2400 meters | |
| 1969 | Tabasco | Jaime Garrido | M. Acevedo | San Martín | | | | 2400 meters | |
| 1968 | Trastévere | Sergio Vera | Juan Suárez | Stud Barlovento | | | | 2400 meters | |
| 1967 | Tanino | Ricardo Cárdenas | A. Cano | Emilito | | | | 2400 meters | |
| 1966 | Arrabal | Ricardo Cárdenas | Erasmo Quiñones | Ica | | | | 2400 meters | |
| 1965 | Fusión | C. Farmer | C. Pianezzi | San Esteban | | | | 2400 meters | |
| 1964 | Giuglio | Luis Alberto Díaz | Segundo Saravia | Austria | | | | 2400 meters | |
| 1963 | Polaris | J. Valdivia | A. Salas | Stud Barlovento | | | | 2400 meters | |
| 1962 | Daré | M. Mendoza | E. Gastaldo | Sin Ruido | | | | 2400 meters | |
| 1961 | Kores | C. Rojas | E. Hernández II | Manolo | | 2:32 4/5 | | | |
| 1960 | Pérfida ƒ | Antonio Vásquez | Ambrossio Malnatti | Quaker State | | | | 2500 meters | |
| 1959 | Pamplona ƒ | Antonio Vásquez | Ambrossio Malnatti | Quaker State | | | | 2500 meters | |
| 1958 | Ruby Silver | J. Atala | Juan Fuentes | Morococha | | | | 2500 meters | |
| 1957 | Perigord | Antonio Vásquez | Ambrossio Malnatti | Quaker State | | | | 2500 meters | |
| 1956 | Pencil | Antonio Vásquez | Ambrossio Malnatti | Quaker State | | | | 2500 meters | |
| 1955 | Río Pallanga | Antonio Marchesini | Alejandro Hernández Laredo | Antonio Chopitea | | | | 2500 meters | |
| 1954 | Pirulín | R. Salazar | Ambrossio Malnatti | Pasamayo | | | | 2500 meters | |
| 1953 | Sherbet | Antonio Vásquez | Ambrossio Malnatti | Quaker State | | | | 2500 meters | |
| 1952 | Alí Khan | Luis Alberto Díaz | A. Echevarría | Victoria | | | | 2400 meters | |
| 1951 | Chantilly | Antonio Vásquez | R. Castelli | Sans Souci | | | | 2400 meters | |
| 1950 | Llanero | Antonio Vásquez | Segundo Saravia | Los Criollos | | | | 2400 meters | |
| 1949 | Pavero | Luis Alberto Díaz | Ambrossio Malnatti | Pasamayo | | | | 2400 meters | |
| 1948 | Imperio * | Alfonso Carbonell | Manuel Castelli | Blue White | | | | 2000 meters | |
| 1948 | Daiquirí * | A. Poblete | Roberto Castelli | Cuba | | | | 2000 meters | |
| 1947 | Premier | Juan Luis Díaz | C. Gonzales | Alcatraz | | | | 2400 meters | |
| 1946 | Superior | Juan Luis Díaz | Juan Fuentes | Tradiciones | | | | 2400 meters | |
| 1945 | Ripley | Alfonso Carbonell | R. Ferrando | Reunión | | | | 2000 meters | |
| 1944 | Monona ƒ | H. Herrera | J. Torres | Cuzco | | | | 2000 meters | |
| 1943 | Gran Dama ƒ | Alfonso Carbonell | A. Ávila | Huascarán | | | | 2000 meters | |
| 1942 | El Vino | J. Bravo | E. Hernández | Los Andrés | | | | 2000 meters | |
| 1941 | Pulgarín | O. Ulloa | Santiago Ferrando | El Látigo | | | | 2000 meters | |
| 1940 | Partícula ƒ | E. Canales | Santiago Ferrando | El Látigo | | | | 2000 meters | |
| 1939 | Corday | Juan Luis Díaz | Segundo Saravia | Santa Bárbara | | | | 2000 meters | |
| 1938 | Berolina ƒ | J. Bravo | Juan Fuentes | Sajonia | | | | 2000 meters | |
| 1937 | Savoia ƒ | Isaías Gonzáles | J. Torres | Italia | | | | 2000 meters | |
| 1936 | Don Manuel | Ceferino Gonzáles | F. Lara | Pisco | | | | 2000 meters | |
| 1935 | Rocketeer | Ceferino Gonzáles | D. Vial | Santa Catalina | | | | 2000 meters | |
| 1934 | La Viña ƒ | L. Fuentes | A. Fernández | San Isidro | | | | 2000 meters | |
| 1933 | Don Augusto | L. Fuentes | A. Ávila | Victoria | | | | 2000 meters | |
| 1932 | Cirano III | Ceferino Gonzáles | J. Herrera | Constancia | | | | 2000 meters | |
| 1931 | Travieso | J. Orellana | Santiago Ferrando | Teresita | | | | 2000 meters | |
| 1930 | Zelim | Ceferino Gonzáles | J. Pianezzi | Eclipse | | | | 2000 meters | |
| 1929 | Lucifer | A. Silva | Santiago Ferrando | Alianza | | 2:05 | | 2000 meters | |
| 1928 | Aramis | Ceferino Gonzáles | J. Pianezzi | Miraflores | | | | | |
| 1927 | Primorosa ƒ | Juan Orellana | V. Castro | Don Ventura | Haras Santa Elena | 2:06 | | 2000 meters | |
| 1926 | Golpe | E. Terán | Santiago Ferrando | Alianza | | | | 2000 meters | |
| 1925 | Misterio | Isaías Gonzáles | Ambrossio Malnatti | Versalles | | | | 2000 meters | |
| 1924 | Irlandés | Isaías Gonzáles | A. Rodríguez | La Granja | Haras San Ignacio | 2:07 1/5 | | 2000 meters | |
| 1923 | Fiorina ƒ | J. Ferrea | P. Bagú | Omega | | | | 1800 meters | |
| 1922 | Carmela ƒ | I. Gonzáles | V. Castro | Porte Bonheur | Haras Lobatón | 1:56 | 3 lengths | 1800 meters | |
| 1921 | Céfiro | Juan Orellana | Santiago Ferrando | Alianza | Haras Vilcahuaura | 1:59 | 1 length | 1800 meters | |
| 1920 | Altanero | A. Solís | Ambrossio Malnatti | Lima | Haras Cayaltí | 1:59 4/5 | 4 lengths | 1800 meters | |
| 1919 | Peruano | P. Costa | R. Gómez | Latino | Haras Lobatón | | | 1800 meters | |
| 1918 | La Beata ƒ | José Herrera | Carlos Lara | Porte Bonheur | Haras Cayaltí | 1:57 4/5 | Several lengths | 1800 meters | |
| 1917 | Ruso | J. Castro | A. Casella | Latino | Haras Cayaltí | 1:58 4/5 | 1 length | 1800 meters | |
| 1916 | Revoltoso | F. Muñoz | Carlos Lara | Porte Bonheur | Haras Lobatón | 1:53 3/5 | 1 1/2 lengths | 1700 meters | |
| 1915 | Hércules | Isaías Gonzáles | Foción Mariátegui | Oasis | Haras Vilcahuaura | 1:56 3/5 | 1 1/2 lengths | 1700 meters | |
| 1914 | Alarmista ƒ | Isaías Gonzáles | E. Bermúdez | Rienzi | | 2:00 | 4 lengths | 1800 meters | |
| 1913 | Pekín | J. Orellana | E. Bermúdez | Rienzi | | 1:55 3/5 | 4 lengths | 1700 meters | |
| 1912 | Sereno | S. Ryan | A. Coloma | Lima | | 1:53 2/5 | Head | 1700 meters | |
| 1911 | Demócrata | F. Muñoz | Carlos Lara | Porte Bonheur | | 1:54 1/5 | 3 lengths | 1700 meters | |
| 1910 | Pisco | J. Contreras | P. Longori | Haras Cayalti | | 1:45 1/5 | Head | 1600 meters | |
| 1909 | Argentina ƒ | J. Contreras | P. Longori | Haras Cayalti | | 1:28 1/5 | 3 lengths | 1300 meters | |
| 1908 | Turf | A. Díaz | R. Díaz | Haras Cayalti | | 1:17 2/5 | 1/2 length | 1200 meters | |
| 1907 | Bridge | F. Muñoz | D. Casella | Haras Cayalti | | 1:17 3/5 | 4 lengths | 1200 meters | |
| 1906 | Rienzi | Luis Benites | J. Ramsing | Alianza | | 1:17 | 2 lengths | 1200 meters | |
| 1905 | Troya II ƒ | Frank Gutiérrez | J. Ramsing | Alianza | | 1:17 | 2 lengths | 1200 meters | |
| 1904 | Año Nuevo | Luis Benites | Luis Zavala | Peruano | | 1:24 | 1/2 length | 1200 meters | |
| 1903 | Mizpah ƒ | Luis Benites | Carlos Zárate | Mizpah | | 1:21 2/5 | 1/2 length | 1200 meters | |

== See also ==
- Horse racing in Peru
