= Hipódromo de Arequipa =

Racecourse in Peru

Hipódromo Arequipa
- View from the grandstand
- Location: Cerro Colorado, Arequipa, Peru
- Owned by: Jockey Club de Arequipa
- Operated by: Jockey Club de Arequipa
- Date opened: November 27, 2009
- Capacity: 1,000
- Screened on: Monterrico TV
- Course type: Flat; 0.86 miles (1.38 km) (dirt); 0.74 miles (1.19 km) (turf)

The Hipódromo Arequipa, also known as the Hipódromo de Cerro Colorado, is a thoroughbred horse racing complex in Cerro Colorado, Arequipa, Peru. Since its opening in 2009, it has hosted the annual Clásico Gran Derby del Sur, as well as several other recurring events, such as concerts and fairs. It replaced the historical venue at Porongoche, located in Paucarpata District.

The racetrack is owned and operated by the Jockey Club de Arequipa, whose headquarters are located at the city's historic centre. It has a capacity for over 1,000 people, and features a roughly seven-eighths-mile dirt racetrack with a three-quarter-mile inside track for turf racing, both of which are flat.

It succeeded the racetrack at Porongoche, whose premises began construction in 1923, becoming operational in 1925. It remained functional until 2008, after which it was replaced by Mall Aventura Plaza, a shopping centre owned by Ripley S.A. whose construction began in 2010.

== History ==
The history of horse racing in Arequipa began in 1878. As was the case with Lima and Callao, it was introduced by local members of the country's British community. The sport was not constantly practiced in the area and ceased to exist by 1912, although the context of the country's centennial celebrations led to a standalone racing event in 1921 that took place at a track in Challapampa. Other events during this period took place in Bellavista.

=== Porongoche (1923–2008) ===
In 1923, efforts began to promote the construction of a racecourse in Arequipa. A group led by Eduardo Villegas Valdez, Carlos A. lbáñez, José R. Gamero, Julio García B. and Víctor Cárdenas unsuccessfully sought financial support among local businessmen, ultimately finding it with enthusiastic members of the agricultural sector, as well as the province's sub-prefect, who provided construction personnel. The venue was inaugurated on December 1, 1923, with a 700-metre (2,300 ft) racetrack. With increased support, grandstands were built, as was a 1,000-metre (3,300 ft) curved track, and thoroughbreds were brought in from Lima. Racing officially began on April 12, 1925.

The grand champion from 1926 onwards was Sideral, originally from the Italia stud farm, owned by Félix Cavallero and Lorenzo Zolezzi and whose horses also ran at Santa Beatriz, in Lima. The venue continued its functions until 1930, and seven breeding farms (haras) were established, including the Pippermint farm, owned by the Delgado Vivanco brothers. Prominent presidents of the club at the time included Carlos H. Delgado and J. Alfonso Delgado Vivanco, the latter of which served as a deputy for La Unión.

In early 1965, the Jockey Club de Arequipa (JCA) temporarily suspended all racing events at the racecourse. In 1968, the JCA and the Hipódromo de Arica hosted the first edition of an alternating international race between both racecourses, during which Fanal defeated Papiro, who had been in an undefeated streak until then. Fanal won by a head, setting a record in the process.

In February 1976, an unusual event took place at the racecourse, when Disney, ridden by César Rojas, ran by itself and lost. The race was authorised by the horse's owner, Federico Roggero Barrera, a prominent horse racing journalist and writer for El Comercio. The event allowed betting, which proved disastrous for the JCA after the horse stopped running in the final straight and refused to move, effectively losing the race. Disney had been brought in earlier that same year to Porongoche, originally from the Recta Final stud farm in Lima, where he had built a successful career.

On May 16, 1978, a deliberate fire destroyed the racecourse's old wooden tribune.

The racecourse held its last race on May 16, 2008, with Sir Robin winning the last ever event in the venue. The venue's racetrack had slight elevation at its first curve, while the last curve had a slight descent.

The 100,000-square-metre (1,100,000 sq ft) site was eventually replaced by the Mall Aventura Plaza, a shopping centre owned by Ripley S.A. whose construction began in 2010. At the time, the company operated two other locations in Trujillo and Callao. The project cost US$ 53 million, and was inaugurated by then president Alan García on March 10, 2011.

=== Cerro Colorado ===
On November 27, 2009, a new complex was inaugurated in Cerro Colorado. Located at a 290,000-square-kilometre (110,000 sq mi) site, it was officially given the name "Hipódromo Arequipa" through popular vote. The project was sponsored by lawyer Francisco Chirinos Soto, who could not attend the opening ceremony.

The COVID-19 pandemic in Peru saw the suspension of all equestrian activities until August 14, 2021, when thirty horses participated in five races in an event that coincided with the city's anniversary. At the time, betting had not yet resumed. Another five-race event was held on September 24, after which activities continued on November 12 with the Clásico Universidad Católica Santa María.

== Facilities ==
The JCA's headquarters are located on this street, near the city's cathedral.

The racecourse has a seven-storey grandstand with a capacity for more than 1,000 spectators divided into five levels, as well as a members' tribune with a capacity of 800. The first two storeys feature administrative offices, a convention hall and a betting hall, as well as bathrooms. The fourth and fifth storeys feature another betting hall, a simulcast room, and a kitchen. The rest of the storeys are used as a grandstand.

The venue features two flat racetracks, the larger of which is a roughly seven-eighths-mile dirt track, and the other is a three-quarter-mile inside track for turf racing. It also has stables, parking spaces and green areas within its premises.

=== Administration ===
The Jockey Club de Arequipa (JCA) owns and operates the complex since its opening. The club, headquartered at La Merced street in central Arequipa, commemorated its 100th anniversary on December 17, 2025.

== Events ==
Major races at the Hipódromo Arequipa include the Clásico Gran Derby del Sur and the Clásico Jockey Club del Perú, among others.

== See also ==
- Hipódromo de Monterrico, located in Lima
- Mall Aventura Plaza Arequipa
