= Tomcito =

Thoroughbred racehorse

- Sire: Street Cry
- Grandsire: Machiavellian
- Dam: Inside or Outside
- Damsire: Eastern Echo
- Sex: Stallion
- Foaled: 2005
- Country: United States
- Colour: Bay
- Breeder: Chesapeake Farm & Darley Stud
- Owner: Jet Set Racing Stable LLC
- Trainer: Dante Zanelli, Jr.
- Record: 6: 4-1-1
- Earnings: US$151,262 graded (equivalent)

Major wins
- Clasico Ricardo Ortiz de Zevallos (2007); Derby Nacional (2007)

Tomcito (foaled February 13, 2005 in Kentucky) is a Peruvian Thoroughbred racehorse.

== Background ==
He was bred by Lexington, Kentucky's Chesapeake Farm and Darley Stud, the latter a part of the worldwide breeding/racing interests of Dubai's Sheikh Mohammed bin Rashid Al Maktoum. Sired by Street Cry, who notably sired the 2007 Kentucky Derby winner, Street Sense, his grandsire Machiavellian was a son of the very important Champion American sire, Mr. Prospector. Tomcito's dam is Inside or Outside, a daughter of the Paul Mellon-bred Eastern Echo who was a son of U.S. Racing Hall of Fame inductee, Damascus.

Tomcito was bought at the 2006 Keeneland September yearling sale by bloodstock agent Dante Zanelli for Peruvian businessmen Omar Mahchi and Esteban Ripamonti who race under the name Stud Jet Set. The purchase price was $7,500; a very tiny amount in the world of Thoroughbred breeding.

== Racing career ==
=== 2007: two-year-old season ===
Because Tomcito was to race in the Southern Hemisphere where horses are foaled beginning in July, in his first year on the track in 2007 the two-year-old colt had to compete against horses aged three or older. Racing at Lima, Peru's Hipodromo de Montericco, Tomcito won his debut race. His handlers then enterer him in the September 23 Group One Clasico Polla de Potrillos (Peruvian 2000 Guineas). Ridden by Benjamin Padilla, the colt came from far back to finish a fast-closing second in the 1600 metre race. He was then entered in the October 20 Clasico Ricardo Ortiz de Zevallos, a 2000-metre (approximately 1¼ miles) Group One race that is the second leg of the Peruvian Quadruple Crown. Once again, Tomcito came from behind, then ran away from the field to win the race by 9 ¾ lengths. In his final race of 2007, on November 17 Tomcito charged from near the back of the back to win Peru's prestigious Group One Derby Nacional.

=== 2008: three-year-old season ===
For the 2008 racing season, Tomcito was shipped north to the Palm Meadows Thoroughbred Training Center in Boynton Beach, Florida and has been nominated to the 2008 U.S. Triple Crown series beginning with the May 3 Kentucky Derby.

Breaking from gate 4 of 12 in the $1 million Grade 1 Florida Derby at Gulfstream Park on March 29, 2008, at 1 1/8 miles distance Tomcito finished 3rd after closing from last place. With jockey Jorge Chavez up he earned $100,000 in graded stakes earnings towards a potential Kentucky Derby start.
