= Mall Aventura Plaza Arequipa =

Mall Aventura Arequipa
- Location: Arequipa, Peru
- Opened: 2010

Mall Aventura Arequipa is a shopping mall in Porongoche, Arequipa, Peru. It was built in the former Hipódromo de Porongoche. It is open to the public. Stores in this mall include Ripley, Falabella, Tottus, Xiaomi, Sodimac, Cinemark, Cibertec, Clínica Internacional, Euroidiomas, MAC Cosmetics.

== See also ==
- Hipódromo de Arequipa
