= Derek (horse) =

Brazilian Thoroughbred racehorse

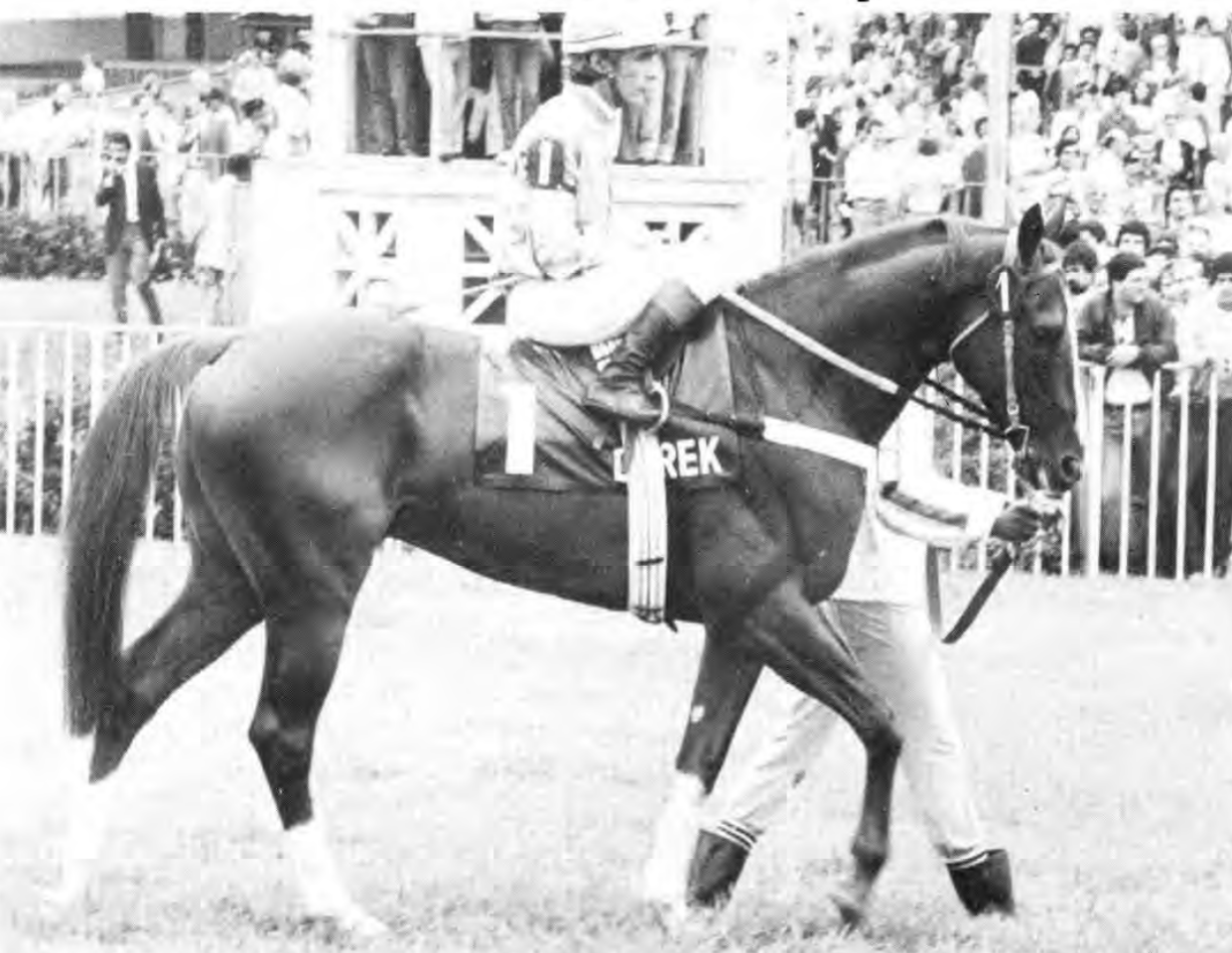
- Derek, ridden by Luiz C. Silva
- Sire: Kublai Khan
- Grandsire: Sideral
- Dam: Epinette
- Damsire: Blackamoor
- Sex: Stallion
- Foaled: July 18, 1978
- Country: Brazil
- Colour: Chestnut
- Breeder: Haras São José e Expedictus
- Owner: Haras São José e Expedictus
- Record: 9: 8–0–0
- Earnings: Cr$68,168,100

Major wins
- G1 Gran Premio Latinoamericano G1 Grande Prêmio Presidente da República G3 Grande Prêmio Piratininga

Derek (foaled 18 July 1978) was a Brazilian racehorse best known for winning the 1983 Gran Premio Latinoamericano.

== Background ==
Derek was bred and owned by Haras São José & Expedictus. His sire, Kublai Khan, had been a stakes winning horse in his native Argentina, and was considered an excellent miler. Derek's dam, Epinette, was a winner who had already produced a graded stakes winner in the filly Laurelle.

Derek was considered to be well built, with an excellent constitution and the strong attitude of a champion.

== Racing career ==
Derek was originally planned to be raced in Argentina, but remained in Brazil for his racing career after overexertion resulted in a tendon problem at the age of two.

Derek began racing in December 1981, winning two races at Hipódromo Cidade Jardim over distances of 1400 and 1500 meters. He then won a 2000-meter race at Hipódromo da Gávea in April 1982.

Derek's first graded stakes race was on May 2, 1982, in the Group 1 Grande Prêmio Taça de Ouro, run over 2000 meters on turf for three-year-olds at Hipódromo da Gávea. He finished 18th of 20.

Derek then returned to Cidade Jardim to win a 1400-meter race in June. He returned to stakes company and Hipódromo da Gávea on August 1, 1982, in the Group 1 Grande Prêmio Presidente da República, a 1600-meter turf race for horses three years old and older. He won by a head in a time of 1:36.

Derek ran on dirt for the first time in January 1983 when he won the Group 3 Grande Prêmio Piratininga in a time of 2:04.4, run over 2000 meters at Hipódromo Cidade Jardim. In this race, he defeated Clackson, a dirt champion considered invincible at the time.

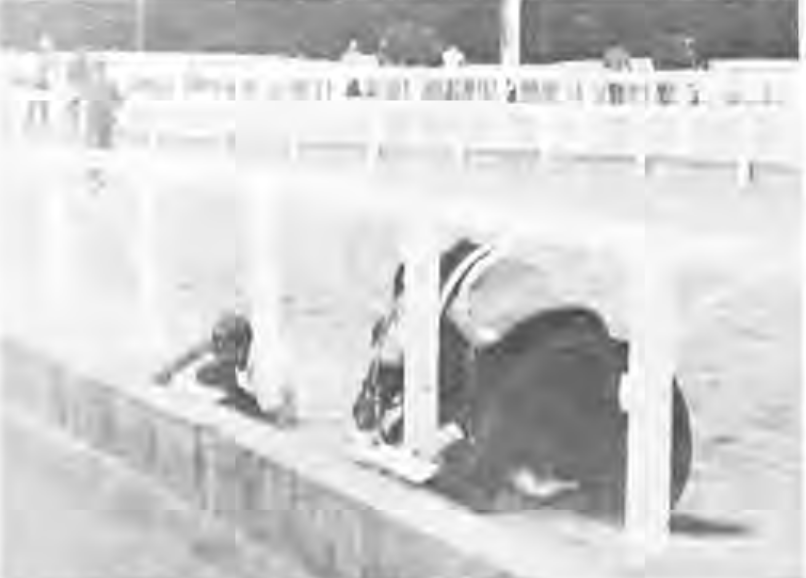
Derek's training accident

As a qualifying race for the Gran Premio Latinoamericano, Derek ran in a 2000-meter turf race at Hipódromo Cidade Jardim on February 12 and won after the favorite's jockey fell off.

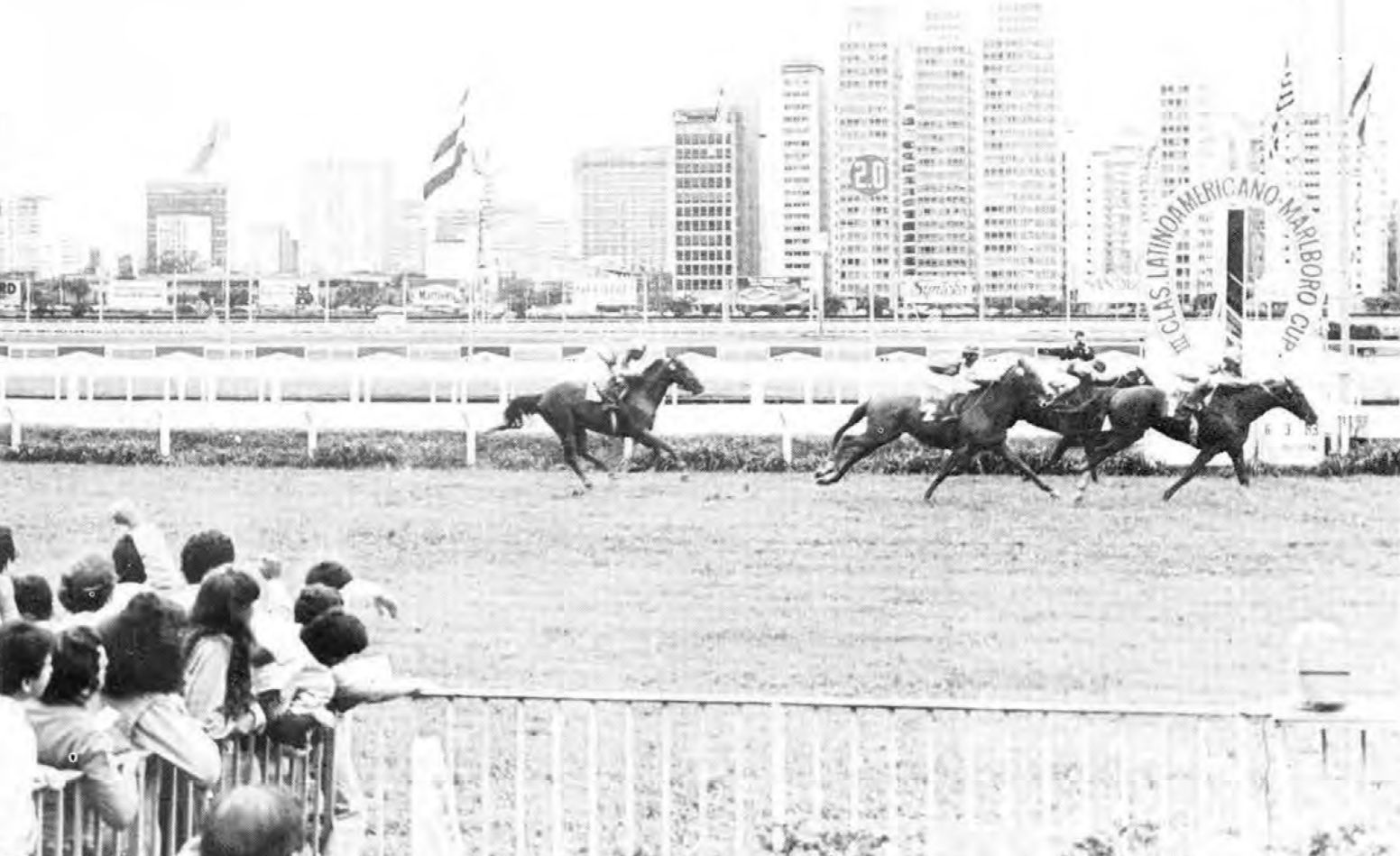
Derek winning the 1983 Gran Premio Latinoamericano

About a week before the Gran Premio Latinoamericano, Derek was being ridden by his regular jockey Albênzio Barroso in his final work for the race when there was an accident caused by a loose mare on the training track, and Derek fell, throwing off Barroso. Barroso broke a rib and was unable to ride in the race. Derek had a bleeding nose and an injury to his left eye. The following day, Derek had a bruise on his left hip, a swollen fetlock, and an almost closed left eye due to swelling, but was no longer bleeding and had eaten all his food. Five days before the Gran Premio Latinoamericano, trainer J.S Silva sent Derek out for a 1600-meter work, ridden by Luiz C. Silva, who would ride him in the race in place of Barroso. Derek improved with the work. On the day of the Gran Premio Latinoamericano, Derek was feverish and was bathed until the fever subsided.

The Gran Premio Latinoamericano was run on March 6, 1983, a rainy day that caused a very heavy track. Derek still seemed feverish shortly before the race and still had visible bruises, leading to him being almost withdrawn from the race. Marc took the early lead, with Derek running three lengths behind in second. About 1400 meters into the race, Derek was passed by Never Be Bad and Salinidad. Entering the final turn, Marc faded, leaving Never Be Bad and Salinidad to fight for the lead. Entering the stretch, Salinidad shook off Never Be Bad, taking a definite lead, but Derek rallied from between her and Never Be Bad. He passed Salinidad to win by three-quarters of a length in a time of 2:09 for the 2000 meters. Derek's connections estimated that the horse was only about 80% recovered from his injury.

== Stud career ==
After the Gran Premio Latinoamericano, Derek was retired to stud. He stood from 1983 to 1997 in Brazil, siring 165 foals. His notable progeny include Group 2 winners Napolitain and Temyr and Group 3 winners Senateur and Dakron.

== Pedigree ==
Pedigree of Derek (BRZ), chestnut colt, 1978
Sire Kublai Khan (ARG) 1968	Sideral 1948	Seductor	Full Sail
Sire Kublai Khan (ARG) 1968	Sideral 1948	Seductor	Suma
Sire Kublai Khan (ARG) 1968	Sideral 1948	Starling	Noble Star
Sire Kublai Khan (ARG) 1968	Sideral 1948	Starling	Feola
Sire Kublai Khan (ARG) 1968	Fantasista (ARG) 1959	Tatán	The Yuvaraj
Sire Kublai Khan (ARG) 1968	Fantasista (ARG) 1959	Tatán	Valkyrie
Sire Kublai Khan (ARG) 1968	Fantasista (ARG) 1959	Fantasy	Embrujo
Sire Kublai Khan (ARG) 1968	Fantasista (ARG) 1959	Fantasy	Farandula
Dam Epinette (BRZ) 1961	Blackamoor (ARG) 1939	Badruddin	Blandford
Dam Epinette (BRZ) 1961	Blackamoor (ARG) 1939	Badruddin	Mumtaz Mahal
Dam Epinette (BRZ) 1961	Blackamoor (ARG) 1939	Apple Cider	Pommern
Dam Epinette (BRZ) 1961	Blackamoor (ARG) 1939	Apple Cider	Mount Whistle
Dam Epinette (BRZ) 1961	Nova Orleans (BRZ) 1948	Maranta	Solario
Dam Epinette (BRZ) 1961	Nova Orleans (BRZ) 1948	Maranta	Mispec
Dam Epinette (BRZ) 1961	Nova Orleans (BRZ) 1948	Haylette	Formasterus
Dam Epinette (BRZ) 1961	Nova Orleans (BRZ) 1948	Haylette	Marion
