= Jockey Club del Perú =

Peruvian horse racing association

Coordinates: 12.0924°S 76.9747°W

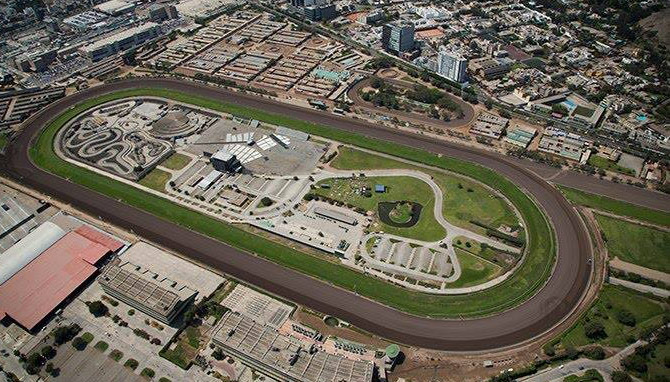
- Aerial view of the racetrack
- Abbreviation: JCP
- Predecessor: Jockey Club de Lima
- Formation: April 4, 1946
- Founder: Junta for Law No. 10345
- Founded at: Lima
- Type: Nonprofit
- Legal status: Asociación Civil
- Headquarters: Santiago de Surco, Peru
- President: Danilo Chávez
- Affiliations: ACCCP
- Website: jcp.org.pe (Archive)

The Jockey Club del Perú (JCP) is a Peruvian civil association headquartered at Fundo Monterrico Chico, a neighbourhood of Santiago de Surco, in Lima. Established on April 4, 1946, it promotes equestrianism in the country. It operates the Hipódromo de Monterrico, the largest in the country.

Dedicated to horse racing and equestrian sports, it is a direct successor of the Jockey Club de Lima, established in 1895 and the operator the now defunct Hipódromo de Santa Beatriz. The race track was replaced by the Hipódromo de San Felipe, operated by the JCP, and eventually replaced by the club in Monterrico. Its current location now hosts a racetrack, multi-purpose entertainment premises, and also serves as the premises of the Peruvian Thoroughbred Breeders Association (ACCCP).

== History ==
The club was preceded by two major institutions in the country: the Sociedad de Carreras del Perú, established in 1871, and the Jockey Club de Lima (JCL), established in 1895.

In March 1945, a request was made by Enrique Ayulo Pardo, president and director of the JCL since May 19, 1934, to completely restructure the club. Ayulo wrote a letter addressed to the club's shareholders, arguing that the sport had regained its prestige after falling out of favour in the aftermath of the 1930 Peruvian coup d'état, and that the country's strong economy would allow improvements in the award system, which would itself serve as an incentive to support the club.

Most shareholders, represented by director-secretary Luis Rodriguez Mariátegui rejected the request. Ayulo resigned in response, as did directors and stud owners Santiago Acuña, Ramón Aspíllaga, Mariano Prado Heudebert, Hernando de Lavalle, Carlos Ferreyros Ribeyro, Eleodoro Romero Romaña, Carlos Palacios Villacampa and Fernando Wiese. The public spat led to the creation of a commission that would investigate the controversy and advise on the matter. Its members were Luis A. Fajardo, Manuel Checa Solari, Adalberto Aspíllaga Delgado, Alfredo Pacheco Benavides and Abel Darg, who were given thirty days to prepare a report. The commission was created by José Luis Bustamante y Rivero following a request by Ricardo Temoche, a deputy for Piura, and concluded that Ayulo and his supporters were in the right.

=== Creation ===
Law No. 10,345 was passed in December 1945, which established an executive board to reorganise the sport in the country through a new non-profit civil association. The board was established on February 1, 1946, and the Jockey Club del Perú (JCP) was established through a public deed executed before notary Ernesto Velarde Aizcorbe on April 4, 1946. The first race took place on the 7th, the first Sunday of the month. After a year, it organised its first elections and dissolved.

At the time, the JCP was headquartered at the Hipódromo de San Felipe, located in San Isidro. In 1951, plans began to build a new racecourse began, as San Felipe's capacity was insufficient for the ever-growing popularity of horse racing in the country. Security was also considered, as a group stopped a race by invading the track and hurling rocks on November 30, 1952. A 110-hectare (270-acre) terrain in Santiago de Surco was acquired by the board of directors in 1955, and construction of the new premises began immediately, concluding in 1960.

That same year, San Felipe held its last race, and the new racecourse—Hipódromo de Monterrico—became operational on December 18, at the time the most modern in South America. Week End was the first race's winning horse. On February 17, 1966, the recreation center was inaugurated, replacing the old central premises at Belén Street. Notable races held in San Felipe included the 1952 "Gran Premio Internacional Presidente de la República del Perú" and the 1959 "Jockey Club del Perú." The club has a seating capacity for about 25,000 people.

== Organisation ==
The club operates the venue in Monterrico as its headquarters, as well as other minor tracks in the country. The country's other major racecourse, in Arequipa, is operated by the Jockey Club de Arequipa.

=== List of presidents ===
The club is headed by a president. Since 2023, the incumbent president is Danilo Chávez Abad.

| Name | Period | |
| Name | Start | End |
|---|---|---|
Sociedad de Carreras del Perú (1871–1895)
| Waldo Graña | 1871 | ? |
Jockey Club de Lima (1895–1946)
| Ricardo Ortiz de Zevallos y Tagle | 1895 | ? |
| Alfredo Benavides Diez-Canseco | 1900 | 1906 |
| Enrique Barreda y Laos | ? | 1914 |
| Ricardo Barreda y Laos | 1914 | ? |
| Mariano Prado y Ugarteche | 1916 | 1921 |
| Miguel A. Checa Eguiguren | 1921 | 1926 |
| Claudio Velarde | 1927 | 1930 |
| Enrique Ayulo Pardo | May 19, 1934 | 1945 |
Jockey Club del Perú
| Executive Board (Note: Roberto Álvarez Calderón Granados served as president of the board, whose other members were Hernán López Cárdenas (vice-president), Abel Darg (secretary), Alfredo Pacheco Benavides (treasurer), Adalberto Aspíllaga Delgado, Manual Checa Solari, Luis Fajardo, Eugenio Isola, Aníbal Perez Velez, Antenor Rizo Patrón, José Soyer Calmet and Miguel Angel Venero (directors).) | February 1, 1946 | 1947 |
| Pedro García Miró | 1947 | ? |
| Carlos Fernández Concha Masías | 1961 | 1963 |
| Augusto Mostajo Barreda | 1981 | 1985 |
| Augusto Mostajo Barreda | 1989 | 1991 |
| Mario Manzur Chamy | 1991 | 1995 |
| Eduardo Villarán Aizcorbe | 1995 | 1999 |
| Francisco Vainstein Borrani | 1999 | 2001 |
| Herbert Moebius Castañeda | 2002 | 2004 |
| Roberto Álvarez Calderón Rey | 2005 | December 11, 2006 |
| Carlos Roe Battistini | 2007 | 2012 |
| Luis Razzeto Ríos | 2012 | 2015 |
| Jorge Mujica Cogorno | 2015 | 2019 |
| Alejandro Aguinaga Recuenco | 2019 | 2023 |
| Danilo Eduardo Chávez Abad | 2023 | 2027 |

== See also ==
- Sport in Peru
