= Asociación Civil =

An Asociación Civil (civil association), in the legal systems of many Spanish-speaking countries, is a nonprofit organization.
