= Santorín (horse) =

Peruvian-bred Thoroughbred racehorse

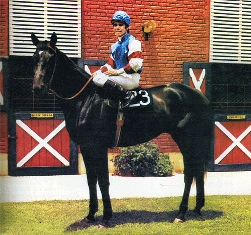
- Santorín
- Sire: Biomydrin
- Grandsire: Ballymoss
- Dam: Missing Moon
- Damsire: Pechazo
- Sex: Stallion
- Foaled: 4 August 1970
- Died: 19 December 1993 (aged 23)
- Country: Peru
- Colour: Black
- Breeder: Haras La Cabaña
- Owner: Augusto Maggiolo's; Barlovento Stud
- Trainer: Juan Suarez
- Record: 13: 8 - 1 - 2
- Earnings: $52,224

Major wins
- Polla de Potrillos (Peru) (1973); Clasico Ricardo Ortiz de Zevallos (1973); Derby Nacional (1973); Gran Premio Nacional Augusto B. Leguia (1973); Gran Premio Carlos Pellegrini (1973)

Awards
- Peruvian Quadruple Crown (1973)

Santorín (Spanish: [santoˈɾin]; August 4, 1970 – December 19, 1993) was a Peruvian Thoroughbred racehorse who was the first to win the Peruvian Quadruple Crown in 1973. He went on to win the Gran Premio Carlos Pellegrini on November 4 of the same year by 13 lengths, for which he became known as the "Saviour of Peruvian Horse Racing" (Spanish: Salvador de la Hípica Peruana). Santorín is regarded as the most important racehorse in Peruvian history and has a monument and race named after him at the Hipódromo de Monterrico.

Santorín died on December 19, 1993, being buried at his owner's Haras Barlovento, where a museum dedicated to him was established. The Clásico Santorín, a Grade 1 race over 2,800 metres (9,200 ft) on turf for three-year-olds or older at the Hipódromo de Monterrico, is named after him. A life size bronze statue made in 1981 by Miguel Baca Rossi also stands at the racecourse. In September 2017, the statue was moved to the paddock.

== Background ==
Santorín was foaled on 4 August 1970 at Haras La Cabaña, owned by Claudio Fernández Concha. He was originally named Blue Prince, and was renamed to Santorín after being purchased in 1972 by Augusto Maggiolo for his Stud Barlovento.

== Racing career ==
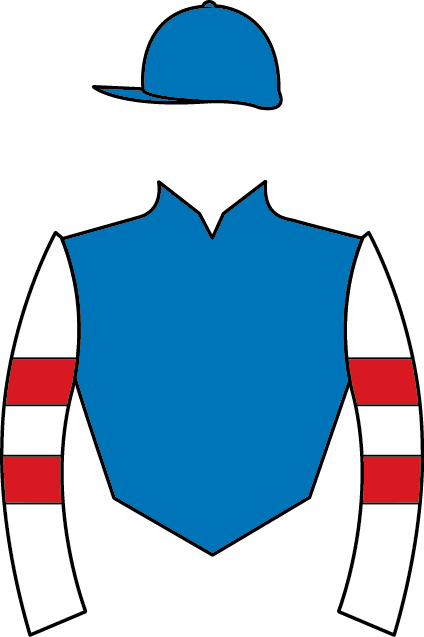
Racing silks of Barlovento Stud

During his Quadruple Crown run, as well as the Gran Premio Carlos Pellegrini, Santorín was ridden by jockey Arthuro Morales.

Santorín was the favorite in the Polla de Potrillos, a race he won from Parnasus by 2.5 lengths in 1:36 2/5. He won both the Clásico Ricardo Ortiz de Zevallos and Derby Nacional by 15 lengths each.

In the Gran Premio Carlos Pellegrini, Santorín ran towards the back of the field for much of the running. About 2000 meters into the 3000 meter race, he began to move forward and was at the front by the time the field entered the homestretch. Santorín separated from the rest of the field about 300 meters from the finish line and drew off to win by 13 lengths. 'No te pares, negrito lindo', stated by Peruvian television personality Augusto Ferrando during this race, became a well-known phrase.

Following the Pellegrini win, Santorín was imported to the United States as Santorín II. He was "entered in, and withdrawn from, virtually every stakes run in Florida" during the first three months of 1974, due to a fever. In his first race in the United States, the Grade 1 Widener Handicap, he was assigned 119 pounds, and was unplaced. The following month, he ran in the Grade 2 Hialeah Turf Cup Handicap, carrying 116 pounds and finishing third, despite being bothered in the stretch.

== Race record ==
Date	Age	Distance	Race	Grade	Track	Time	Finish	Margin	Jockey	Trainer	Ref
8 April 1973	2		Premio Competencia		Hipódromo de Monterrico		2				
13 May 1973	2	1400 meters	Premio Carlos 2nd Watson y F. G. Watson	Stakes	Hipódromo de Monterrico	1:25	1				
2 June 1973	2	1500 meters	Premio Augusto N. Wiese	Stakes	Hipódromo de Monterrico	1:31.2	1		Juan Picón		
14 July 1973	2	1600 meters	Premio Fuerza Aerea del Perú	Stakes	Hipódromo de Monterrico	1:37.40	1		Juan Picón		
11 August 1973	3	1600 meters	Polla de Potrillos	Stakes	Hipódromo de Monterrico	1:36 2/5	1	2 1/2 lengths	Juan Picón	Juan Suárez Sr.	
26 August 1973	3		Premio Bodas Plata Asociacion de Propietarios de Caballo de Carrera del Peru		Hipódromo de Monterrico		3				
9 September 1973	3	2000 meters	Clásico Ricardo Ortiz de Zevallos	Stakes	Hipódromo de Monterrico	2:03	1	15 lengths	Arturo Morales	Juan Suárez Sr.	
14 October 1973	3	2400 meters	Derby Nacional	Stakes	Hipódromo de Monterrico	2:30	1	15 lengths	Arturo Morales	Juan Suárez Sr.	
4 September 1973	3	3000 meters	Gran Premio Internacional Carlos Pellegrini	1	Hipódromo Argentino de Palermo	3:03.4	1	13 lengths	Arturo Morales	Juan Suárez Sr.	
20 December 1973	3	2800 meters	Gran Premio Nacional Augusto B. Leguía	Stakes	Hipódromo de Monterrico		1		Arturo Morales	Juan Suárez Sr.	
23 March 1974	3	10 furlongs	Widener Handicap	1	Hialeah Park Race Track	2:01.2	6				
13 April 1974	3	12 furlongs	Hialeah Turf Cup Handicap	2	Hialeah Park Race Track	2:26.2	3		Fernando Toro		

One other start is not included.

== Stud career ==
Santorín stood at stud at his owner's Haras Barlovento. There, he sired Galeno, who would go on to win two of the Peruvian Triple Crown races as well as the Gran Premio Latinoamericano.

== Pedigree ==
Pedigree of Santorín (PER), black horse, 1970
Sire Biomydrin (GB) 1962	Ballymoss (GB); 1954	Mossborough (GB)	Nearco (ITY)
Sire Biomydrin (GB) 1962	Ballymoss (GB); 1954	Mossborough (GB)	All Moonshine (GB)
Sire Biomydrin (GB) 1962	Ballymoss (GB); 1954	Indian Call (GB)	Singapore (GB)
Sire Biomydrin (GB) 1962	Ballymoss (GB); 1954	Indian Call (GB)	Flittemere (GB)
Sire Biomydrin (GB) 1962	Collyria (GB); 1956	Arctic Prince (GB)	Prince Chevalier (FRA)
Sire Biomydrin (GB) 1962	Collyria (GB); 1956	Arctic Prince (GB)	Arctic Sun (GB)
Sire Biomydrin (GB) 1962	Collyria (GB); 1956	Eyewash (GB)	Blue Peter (GB)
Sire Biomydrin (GB) 1962	Collyria (GB); 1956	Eyewash (GB)	All Moonshine (GB)
Dam Missing Moon (ARG) 1964	Pechazo (ARG); 1957	Guatan (ARG)	Floretista (ARG)
Dam Missing Moon (ARG) 1964	Pechazo (ARG); 1957	Guatan (ARG)	Guayaca (ARG)
Dam Missing Moon (ARG) 1964	Pechazo (ARG); 1957	Perplexe (ARG)	Master Fere (GB)
Dam Missing Moon (ARG) 1964	Pechazo (ARG); 1957	Perplexe (ARG)	Peony (ARG)
Dam Missing Moon (ARG) 1964	Mischance (ARG); 1949	Chancery (GB)	Bold Archer (GB)
Dam Missing Moon (ARG) 1964	Mischance (ARG); 1949	Chancery (GB)	La Chance (IRE)
Dam Missing Moon (ARG) 1964	Mischance (ARG); 1949	Minerva (ARG)	Fox Cub (FRA)
Dam Missing Moon (ARG) 1964	Mischance (ARG); 1949	Minerva (ARG)	Miette (ARG)

== See also ==
- Horse racing in Peru
