= Gran Premio Asociación Latinoamericana de Jockey Clubes e Hipódromos =

Gran Premio Latinoamericano
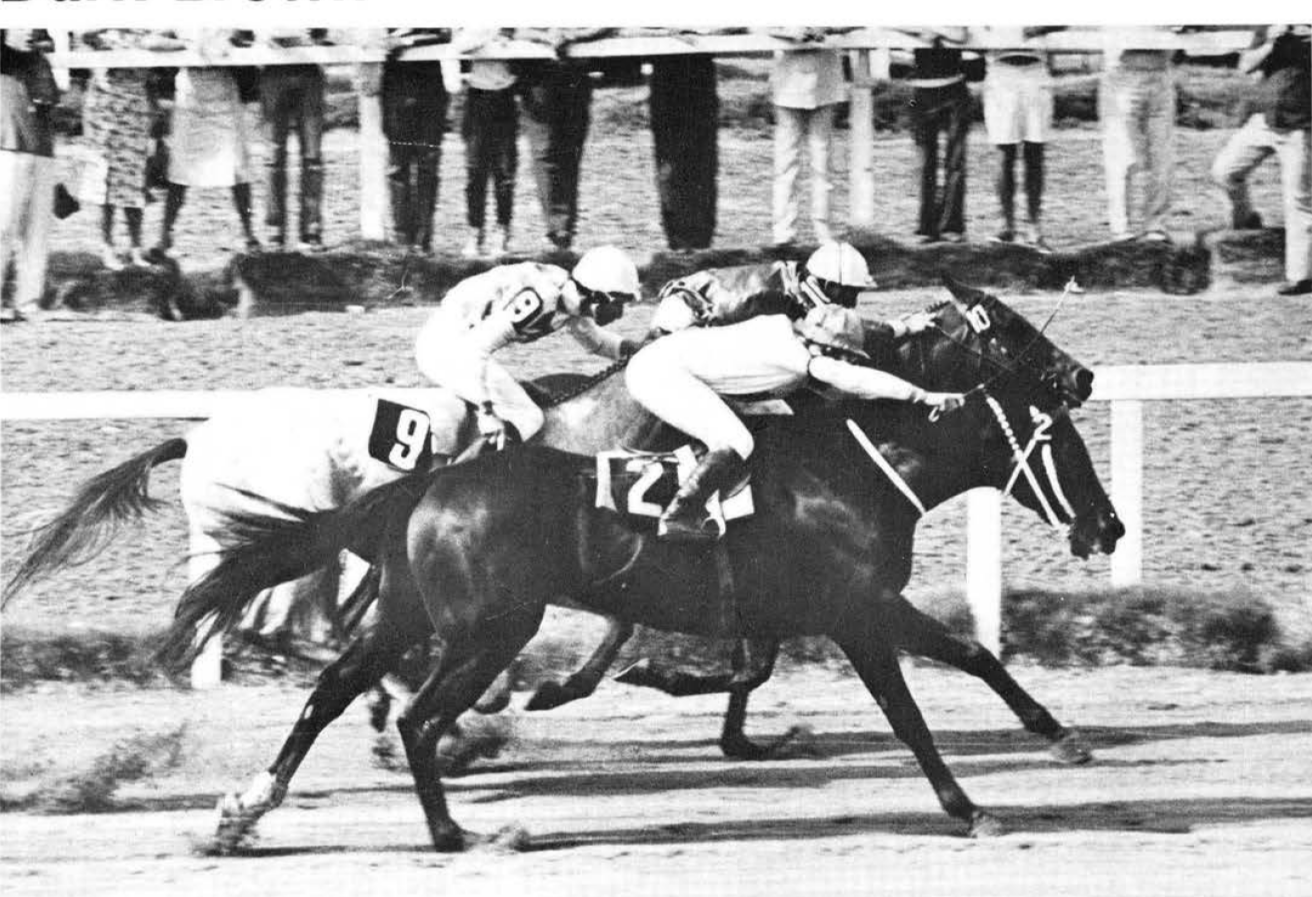
- The homestretch of the inaugural Gran Premio Latinoamericano
- Class: Grade I
- Location: South America
- Inaugurated: 1981
- Race type: Thoroughbred

Race information
- Distance: Varies
- Surface: Varies
- Track: Varies
- Qualification: 3-year-olds and up
- Weight: Assigned
- Purse: US$360,000 (2022); 1st: US$216,000

The Gran Premio Latinoamericano, formerly known as the Gran Premio Asociación Latinoamericana de Jockey Clubes e Hipódromos and currently also known as the Longines Gran Premio Latinoamericano due to sponsorship reasons, is a Group 1 horse race in Latin America alternatively run in Argentina, Brazil, Chile, Panama, Peru, and Uruguay. It is the richest and one of the most important races in Latin America. The Gran Premio Latinoamericano is the only Group 1 race in the world that is itinerant and changes location and country every year.

The race is run annually in March (excepting exceptional circumstances requiring a change in date) over a distance between 2000 metres (1.2 mi) and 2400 metres (1.5 mi) on either a dirt or turf track and is open to horses three-year-old or older that have been either nominated by a member racecourse or their owner.

The current member racecourses are the Argentinian Jockey Club (Hipódromo de San Isidro), Hipódromo Argentino de Palermo, Hipódromo La Plata, São Paulo Jockey Club (Hipódromo Cidade Jardim), Jockey Club Brasileiro (Hipódromo da Gávea), Club Hípico de Santiago, Hipódromo Chile, Valparaiso Sporting Club, Hipódromo de las Américas, Hípica de Panamá (Hipódromo Presidente Remón), Jockey Club del Perú (Hipódromo de Monterrico), and HRU (Hipodromo Nacional de Maroñas).

== History ==
In 1980, the newly formed Latin American Association of Jockey Clubs and Racecourses (Asociación Latinoamericana de Jockey Clubes e Hipódromos), consisting of the Jockey Club de Buenos Aires, Jockey Club Brasileiro, Jockey Club de São Paulo, Club Hípico de Santiago, Hipódromo Chile, Jockey Club del Perú, Jockey Club de Montevideo, and Jockey Club de Venezuela, met and began planning an international race among them, rotating between the member racecourses, that eventually became the Gran Premio Latinoamericano. Mexico, Panama, and Puerto Rico later joined the Association, and in 2012 the Association was integrated into OSAF, the South American Organization for the Development of Thoroughbreds (Organización Sudamericana de Fomento del Sangre Pura de Carrera).

The Gran Premio Latinoamericano was first run in 1981 at Hipodromo Nacional de Maroñas. From 2000 to 2003, the race was not run due to a lack of money, but has been continuously run since 2004. The race has been sponsored by Longines since 2014. In 2016, the race was established as a race open to any horse originating from any country and was the first time that doping control was performed in a reference lab as recognized by the International Federation of Horseracing Authorities (IFHA).

The greatest number of entries to run in the race is 18, first in 1986 and again in 2020. All but five of the winners were bred in the country they represented, with the exceptions being Good Report in 2007 (Argentina-bred, ran for Uruguay), Deepak in 2008 (USA-bred, ran for Peru), Lideris in 2014 (USA-bred, ran for Peru), Aero Trem in 2021 (Brazilian-bred, ran for Uruguay), and Manyuz in 2024 (USA-bred, ran for Peru).

The 2006 running was the first time the race was simulcasted in North America, with Laurel Park serving as the hub.

The 2010 edition, run at Club Hípico de Santiago in Chile, was postponed until September due to an earthquake.

In 2018, Chilean horses were not allowed to take part in the Gran Premio Latinoamericano due to a temporary ban on importing Chilean horses into the hosting country of Uruguay on account of a contagious disease outbreak at a Chilean training center.

Due to the COVID-19 pandemic, the 2020 edition of the race was in doubt and finally run behind closed doors as part of the last day of racing in Argentina for five months. The 2021 was initially set to run at Hipódromo de Monterrico, but was instead moved to Hipódromo de Maroñas and run in October instead of its usual March date, in front of a crowd of spectators limited to 3,500 fully vaccinated people.

Discussions were held about hosting the 2021 edition in North America for the first time, at Gulfstream Park.

In 2021, all three Uruguayan entries were owned, trained, and ridden by Brazilians, with the only Uruguayan professional involved being Héctor Fabián Lazo, jockey of the Chilean entry Win Here.

== Locations ==
Since its inauguration, the Gran Premio Latinoamericano has been run at eleven different tracks in six different countries.

Times	Track	Country	Years	Conditions
8	Hipódromo de San Isidro	(Argentina)	1982, 1992, 1998, 2005, 2011, 2020, 2023, 2025	2000 meters turf
7	Hipódromo de Monterrico	(Peru)	1987, 1993, 1999, 2008, 2014, 2024, 2026	2000 meters dirt, 2200 meters dirt (1987 only)
6	Hipódromo Chile	(Chile)	1984, 1990, 1997, 2004, 2013, 2022	2000 meters dirt
4	Club Hípico de Santiago	(Chile)	1988, 1995, 2010, 2019	2000 meters turf
4	Hipódromo da Gávea	(Brazil)	1985, 1998, 2016, 2025	2000 meters turf
4	Hipodromo Nacional de Maroñas	(Uruguay)	1981, 2006, 2018, 2021	2000 meters dirt
3	Hipódromo de La Plata	(Argentina)	1989, 1994, 2007	2100 meters dirt
3	Hipódromo Cidade Jardim	(Brazil)	1983, 1991, 2009	2000 meters turf
2	Hipódromo Argentino de Palermo	(Argentina)	2012, 2015	2100 meters dirt
1	Valparaiso Sporting Club	(Chile)	2017	2400 meters turf
1	Hipódromo La Rinconada	(Venezuela)	1986	2000 meters dirt

== Records ==
Speed records:

- 2000 meters (turf): 1:56.68 – Ya Primo (2019)
- 2000 meters (dirt): 1:59.16 – Aero Trem (2021)
- 2100 meters (dirt): 2:05.82 – Quick Casablanca (2012)
- 2200 meters (dirt): 2:19.40 – Galeno (1987)
- 2400 meters (turf): 2:24.88 – Sixties Song (2017)

Most wins:

- 2 – Much Better (1994, 1996)

Most wins by a jockey:

- 5 – Jorge Ricardo (1991, 1994, 1996, 1998, 2007)
- 3 – Edwin Talaverano (1993, 1999, 2015)
- 3 – Carlos Trujillo (2008, 2011, 2024)
- 2 – Jorge Valdivieso (1989, 2005)
- 2 – Victor Bardales (1986, 1987)
- 2 – Luis Torres (2004, 2026)

Most wins by a trainer:

- 3 – João Luiz Maciel (1991, 1994, 1996)
- 2 – Jorge Salas Vera (2008, 2011)

Most wins by an owner:

- 2 – Stud Myrna (2008, 2011)
- 2 – Stud TNT (1994, 1996)

Most wins by a breeder:

- 3 – Haras Río Santa (1986, 1999, 2004)
- 3 – Haras Matancilla (1990, 2010, 2012)
- 3 – Haras J. B. Barros (1994, 1996, 2009)
- 2 – Haras Don Alberto (2019, 2026)

Wins by country:

- Brazil – 12 (1981, 1982, 1983, 1985, 1991, 1994, 1996, 1998, 2009, 2016, 2023, 2025)
- Chile – 11 (1984, 1988, 1990, 1995, 1997, 2010, 2012, 2013, 2019, 2022, 2026)
- Peru – 10 (1986, 1987, 1993, 1999, 2004, 2008, 2011, 2014, 2015, 2024)
- Argentina – 7 (1989, 1992, 2005, 2006, 2017, 2018, 2020)
- Uruguay – 2 (2007, 2021)

Wins by country bred:

- Brazil – 13 (1981, 1982, 1983, 1985, 1991, 1994, 1996, 1998, 2009, 2016, 2021, 2023, 2025)
- Chile – 11 (1984, 1988, 1990, 1995, 1997, 2010, 2012, 2013, 2019, 2022, 2026)
- Argentina – 8 (1989, 1992, 2005, 2006, 2007, 2017, 2018, 2020)
- Peru – 7 (1986, 1987, 1993, 1999, 2004, 2011, 2015)
- United States of America – 3 (2008, 2014, 2024)

== Winners ==
Year	Host Track	Winner	Sire/Dam	Jockey	Trainer	Owner	Breeder	Distance	Track	Time	Margin	Ref
2026	(Peru) Monterrico	(Chile) Teao (CHI)	(Chile) Ya Primo (Chile) Ti Ricorderai	Luis Torres	Julio Orellana R.	Stud El Tata	Haras Don Alberto	2000 meters	Turf	2:00.11	2 lengths	
2025	(Brazil) Gávea	(Brazil) Obataye (BRZ)	(United States) Courtier (Brazil) Surfi'n USA	João Moreira	Antonio Oldoni	Haras Rio Iguassú	Haras Palmerini	2000 meters	Turf	1:58.59	1 1/2 lengths	
2024	(Peru) Monterrico	(Peru) Manyuz (USA)	(United States) Run Away And Hide (United States) Viva La Flag	Carlos Trujillo	Juan Suarez Villarroel	Stud Jet Set	Aaron Sones	2000 meters	Dirt	2:04.38	3 3/4 lengths	
2023	(Argentina) San Isidro	(Brazil) Doutor Sureño (BRZ)	(Japan) Agnes Gold (Brazil) Notavel Sureño	Silva José Severo	Neto Victorio Fornasaro	Haras Moema	Haras Old Friends	2000 meters	Turf	1:58.02	3 lengths	
2022	Hipódromo Chile	(Chile) O'Connor (CHI)	(United States) Boboman (Chile) Torrente de Agua	Jorge A. González	Carlos Urbina	Stud Irlandés	Haras Carioca	2000 meters	Dirt	2:03.63	7 3/4 lengths	
2021	(Uruguay) Maroñas	(Uruguay) Aero Trem (BRZ)	(United States) Shanghai Bobby (Brazil) Piace Molto	Vagner Leal	Antonio Cintra	Haras Old Friends	Haras Old Friends	2000 meters	Dirt	1:59.16	3/4 lengths	
2020	(Argentina) San Isidro	(Argentina) Tetaze (ARG)	(Argentina) Equal Stripes (Argentina) Delirada	Gustavo Calvente	Roberto Pellegatta	Stud Juan Antonio	Haras Abolengo	2000 meters	Turf	2:03.71	2 lengths	
2019	(Chile) Club Hípico	(Chile) Ya Primo (CHI)	(Republic of Ireland) Mastercraftsman (Chile) Yo Quisiera	Jeremy Laprida	Guillermo Aguirre	Stud La Pacita	Haras Don Alberto	2000 meters	Turf	1:56.68	3 3/4 lengths	
2018	(Uruguay) Maroñas	(Argentina) Roman Rosso (ARG)	(United States) Roman Ruler (Argentina) Rose City	Wilson Moreyra	Jorge Mayansky Neer	Haras Melinoué	Haras La Primavera	2000 meters	Dirt	2:02.05	1 length	
2017	(Chile) Valparaiso Sporting Club	(Argentina) Sixties Song (ARG)	(United Kingdom) Sixties Icon (United States) Blissful Song	Juan C. Villagra	Alfredo Gaitán Dassié	Stud Santa Elena	Haras Firmamento	2400 meters	Turf	2:24.86	2 1/4 lengths	
2016	(Brazil) Gávea	(Brazil) Some In Tieme (BRZ) (Note: Disqualification of winner Don Inc (ARG) and fifth-placed Río Allipen (CHI) due to doping.)	(Germany) Shirocco (Brazil) Orma Giusta	Waldomiro Blandi	Gladston F. Santos	Oitavo Stud	Haras Princeza do Sul	2000 meters	Turf	1:59.14		
2015	(Argentina) Palermo	(Peru) Liberal (PER)	(Peru) Meal Penalty (United States) Democracia	Edwin Talaverano	Camilo Traverso II	Stud The Fathers	Haras Los Azahares	2100 meters	Dirt	2:09.81		
2014	(Peru) Monterrico	(Peru) Lideris (USA)	(United States) Mizzen Mast (United States) Block	Juan E. Enriquez	Romulo R. Herrera	Stud OP	Claiborne Farm	2000 meters	Dirt	2:07.52		
2013	Hipódromo Chile	(Chile) Sabor a Triunfo (CHI) ƒ	(Canada) Dance Brightly (Chile) Sally Mash	David Sanchez	Alejandro Aguado	Stud Trafalgar	Haras Puerta de Hierro	2000 meters	Dirt	2:04.66		
2012	(Argentina) Palermo	(Chile) Quick Casablanca (CHI)	(United States) Until Sundown (Argentina) Quick	Gonzalo Ulloa	Juan P. Baeza	Stud Carrillanca	Haras Matancilla	2100 meters	Dirt	2:05.83		
2011	(Argentina) San Isidro	(Peru) Bradock (PER)	(United States) Keseff (Peru) Samara	Carlos Trujillo	Jorge S. Vera	Stud Myrna	Haras Myrna	2000 meters	Turf	2:00.40		
2010	(Chile) Club Hípico	(Chile) Belle Watling (CHI) ƒ	(United States) Dushyantor (Chile) Biala	Héctor I. Berrios	Patricio Baeza	Stud Don Theo	Haras Matancilla	2000 meters	Turf; Right-handed	1:59.81		
2009	(Brazil) Cidade Jardim	(Brazil) Hot Six (BRZ)	(United Kingdom) Burooj (United States) Babysix	Jorge Leme	Givanildo Duarte	Stud Estrela Energia	Haras J. B. Barros	2000 meters	Turf	2:03.04		
2008	(Peru) Monterrico	(Peru) Deepak (USA)	(United States) Pikepass (United States) Unbridled Queen	Carlos Trujillo	Jorge S. Vera	Stud Myrna	Jon Follart	2000 meters	Dirt	2:08.40		
2007	(Argentina) La Plata	(Uruguay) Good Report (ARG)	(United States) Ride the Rails (Argentina) Good Pearl	Jorge Ricardo	Luis Belela	Haras Santa Tereza	Haras Abolengo	2100 meters	Dirt	2:10.40		
2006	(Uruguay) Maroñas	(Argentina) Latency (ARG)	(United States) Slew Gin Fizz (Argentina) Latencia	Julio C. Méndez	Juan B. Udaondo	Haras Las Dos Manos	Haras Las Dos Manos	2000 meters	Dirt	2:00.27		
2005	(Argentina) San Isidro	(Argentina) Don Incauto (ARG)	(United States) Roy (Argentina) Inspiration	Jorge Valdivieso	Carlos Etchechoury	Haras San Benito	Haras San Benito	2000 meters	Turf	1:57.92		
2004	Hipódromo Chile	(Peru) Comando Intimo (PER)	(United Kingdom) Riyadian (United States) Zilliant	Luis Torres	Félix Banda	Stud El Castillo	Haras Río Santa	2000 meters	Dirt	2:05.40		
2001- 2003	Races not held											
2000	(Brazil) Cidade Jardim	Race cancelled										
1999	(Peru) Monterrico	(Peru) Madame Equis (PER) ƒ	(United Kingdom) Book The Band (Peru) Universitaria	Edwin Talaverano	Mario Morales	Stud Capri	Haras Río Santa	2000 meters	Dirt	2:03.39		
1998	(Argentina) San Isidro	(Brazil) Jimwaki (BRZ)	(United States) Gem Master (United States) Winwaki	Jorge Ricardo	José M. Alves	Haras Equilia	Haras Equilia	2000 meters	Turf	1:57.46		
1997	Hipódromo Chile	(Chile) Prepo (CHI)	(United States) Inchwood (Chile) Preppy	Hector Barrera	Pedro Melej	Stud Hermanos	Haras Santa Isabel	2000 meters	Dirt	2:02.30		
1996	(Brazil) Gávea	(Brazil) Much Better (BRZ)	(Republic of Ireland) Baynoun (Brazil) Charming Doll	Jorge Ricardo	João L. Maciel	Stud TNT	Haras J. B. Barros	2000 meters	Turf	1:59.50 fm		
1995	(Chile) Club Hípico	(Chile) Patio de Naranjos (CHI)	(United States) Gallantsky (Chile) Dosis	Pedro Santos	Alfredo Bagú	Stud Nadia	Haras Santa Olga	2000 meters	Turf; Right-handed	1:59.30		
1994	(Argentina) La Plata	(Brazil) Much Better (BRZ)	(Republic of Ireland) Baynoun (Brazil) Charming Doll	Jorge Ricardo	João L. Maciel	Stud TNT	Haras J. B. Barros	2100 meters	Dirt	2:11.20		
1993	(Peru) Monterrico	(Peru) Stash (PER)	(United States) Stack (United States) Simper	Edwin Talaverano	Miguel Salas	Stud Azul Marino	Haras Rancho Fatima	2000 meters	Dirt	2:06.10 fm		
1992	(Argentina) San Isidro	(Argentina) Potrillon (ARG)	(Argentina) Ahmad (Argentina) Azalita	Pablo Falero	Juan C. Maldotti	Stud Tori	Haras La Madrugada	2000 meters	Turf	1:59.20		
1991	(Brazil) Cidade Jardim	(Brazil) Falcon Jet (BRZ)	(France) Ghadeer (Sweden) Victress	Jorge Ricardo	João L. Maciel	Haras Santa Ana do Rio Grande	Haras Santa Ana do Rio Grande	2000 meters	Turf	1:59.10 fm		
1990	Hipódromo Chile	(Chile) Edipo Rey (CHI)	(United States) Semenenko (Chile) Espumita	Danilo Salinas	Samuel Fuentes	Haras Matancilla	Haras Matancilla	2000 meters	Dirt	1:59.70		
1989	(Argentina) La Plata	(Argentina) Savage Toss (ARG)	(United States) Egg Toss (Argentina) Sibaritante	Jorge Valdivieso	Carlos R. Bianchi	Haras La Biznaga	Haras La Biznaga	2100 meters	Dirt	1:59.30 fm		
1988	(Chile) Club Hípico	(Chile) Dorticos (CHI)	(United States) Domineau (Chile) Farrerita	Sergio Vasquez	Jorge I. Meyer	Stud Cinco Estrellas	Haras Santa Amelia	2000 meters	Turf; Right-handed	1:58.60 fm		
1987	(Peru) Monterrico	(Peru) Galeno (PER)	(Peru) Santorin (Peru) Codicia	Victor Bardales	Luis Melgar	Stud Nancy	Haras Barlovento	2200 meters	Dirt	2:19.20		
1986	(Venezuela) La Rinconada	(Peru) Lutz (PER)	(United States) Lord Layabout (Peru) Presunción	Victor Bardales	Sabino Arias	Stud Atlántico	Haras Río Santa	2000 meters	Dirt	2:07.30		
1985	(Brazil) Gávea	(Brazil) Old Master (BRZ)	(Brazil) Sabinus (Brazil) Ice Queen	Francisco Pereira	Wilson P. Lavor	Haras Santa Maria de Araras	Haras Santa Maria de Araras	2000 meters	Turf	2:00.30 fm		
1984	Hipódromo Chile	(Chile) High Master (CHI)	(Brazil) Hawk (Chile) La Pola	Adolfo Gonzalez	Juan C. Acevedo	Haras Santa Eladia	Haras Santa Eladia	2000 meters	Dirt	2:01.00 fm		
1983	(Brazil) Cidade Jardim	(Brazil) Derek (BRZ)	(Argentina) Kublai Khan (Brazil) Epinette	Luiz C. Silva	José S. Silva	Haras São José & Expedictus	Haras São José & Expedictus	2000 meters	Turf	1:59.10 fm		
1982	(Argentina) San Isidro	(Brazil) Duplex (BRZ)	(United Kingdom) Breeder's Dream (Brazil) Dulcine	Jorge Garcia	Wilfrido Garcia	Stud Jupiá	Haras Guanabara	2000 meters	Turf	2:01.10 fm		
1981	(Uruguay) Maroñas	(Brazil) Dark Brown (BRZ)	(United States) Tumble Lark (Argentina) Nogueira	Antonio Bolino	Abadio Cabreira	Haras Rosa do Sul	Haras Rosa do Sul	2000 meters	Dirt	2:00.70		

ƒ designates a filly or mare winner
