= Residencial San Felipe =

Residential complex in Peru

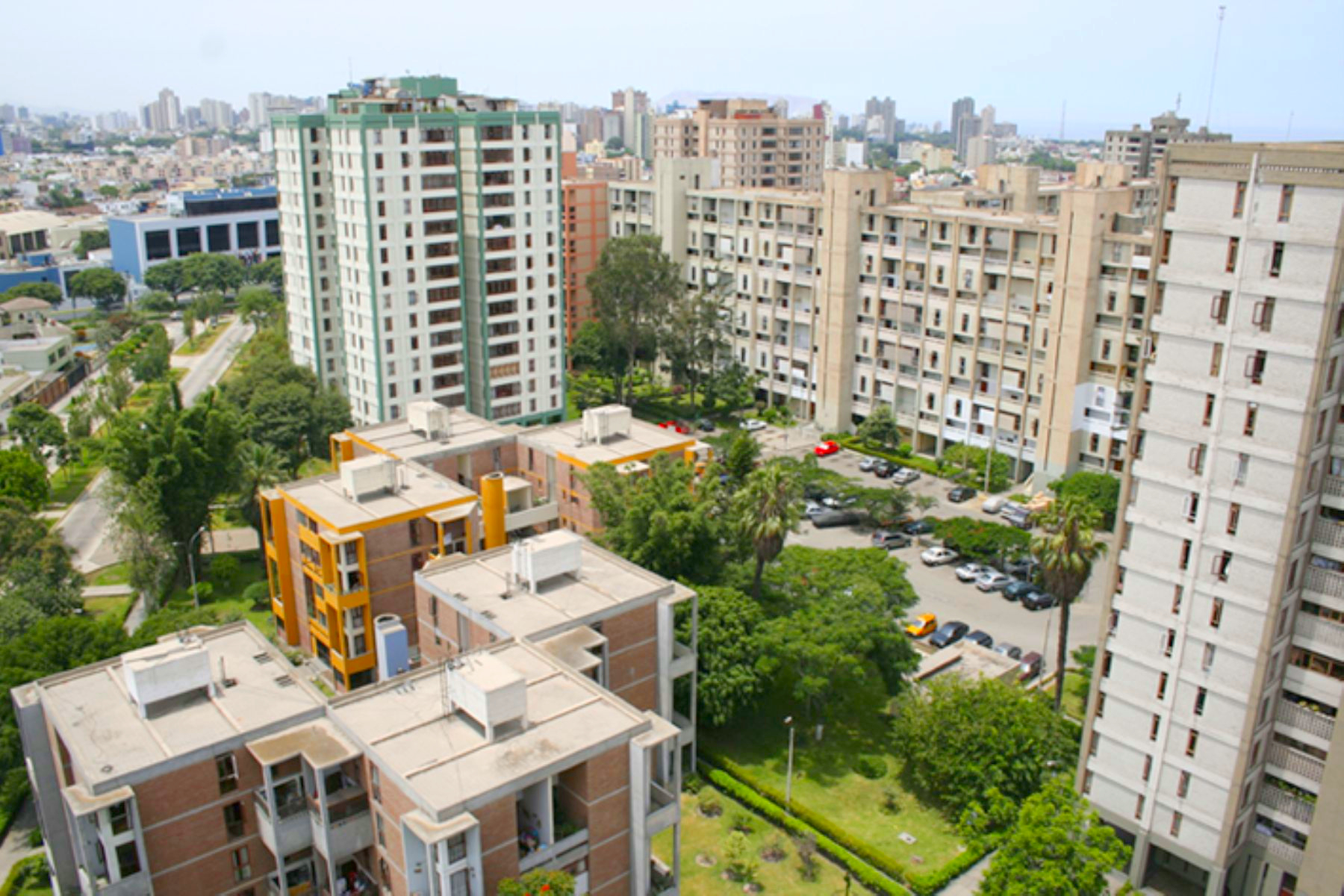
- Interactive map of the Residencial San Felipe area

General information
- Architectural style: Modern
- Year built: 1962–1966

The Residencial San Felipe is a residential complex for middle-class families located in Jesús María District, Lima, Peru. It is built in the former premises of San Felipe racetrack, with its construction being decided in 1962 by the military government of Ricardo Pérez Godoy.

== History ==
It was built on part of the land of the old San Felipe Hippodrome, from which it takes its name. It was designed by the team of architects of the National Housing Board of the first presidency of Fernando Belaúnde, and part of the architectural project developed by the Peruvian State to alleviate the housing needs of the middle class. The work began in 1962 and was delivered four years later. The residential complex consists of 33 buildings of different heights. The land occupies an area of 27 hectares, with squares and 25,000 m^{2} of gardens. It has some 1,599 multi-family homes for the middle class due to the growth of the population in Lima, with affordable prices and easy payments.

== See also ==
- 1962 Peruvian coup d'état
- Hipódromo de San Felipe
