= Hipódromo de San Felipe =

Racecourse in Peru

- The racetrack in 1949
- Interactive map of Hipódromo de San Felipe
- Location: Lima, Peru
- Owned by: Lima Jockey Club
- Date opened: December 4, 1938
- Date closed: after 1960

The Hippodrome of San Felipe (Spanish: Hipódromo de San Felipe) was a hippodrome located next to Salaverry Avenue in Jesús María District, Lima, Peru. It was preceded by the racetrack in Santa Beatriz, disestablished with the expansion of the city of Lima. It has since been demolished, with its premises currently occupied by the Residencial San Felipe.

== History ==
After the city's growth determined the racetrack in Santa Beatriz's fate, with Enrique Ayulo Pardo, then president of the Lima Jockey Club, managing to reach a deal with then president of Peru Óscar R. Benavides, where a new racecourse would occupy another territory under the terms of the original lease, while the territories granted for the first hippodrome's construction would be returned to the club. The territory chosen for the new track was located next to Salaverry Avenue, in the district of Jesús María.

The racetrack was inaugurated on December 4, 1938, existing for 22 years. The area was chosen to become a residential complex under the military government of Ricardo Pérez Godoy, with the club moving to a new location in Monterrico.

== See also ==
- Hipódromo de Santa Beatriz
- Hipódromo de Monterrico
