= Hipódromo de Santa Beatriz =

Racecourse in Peru

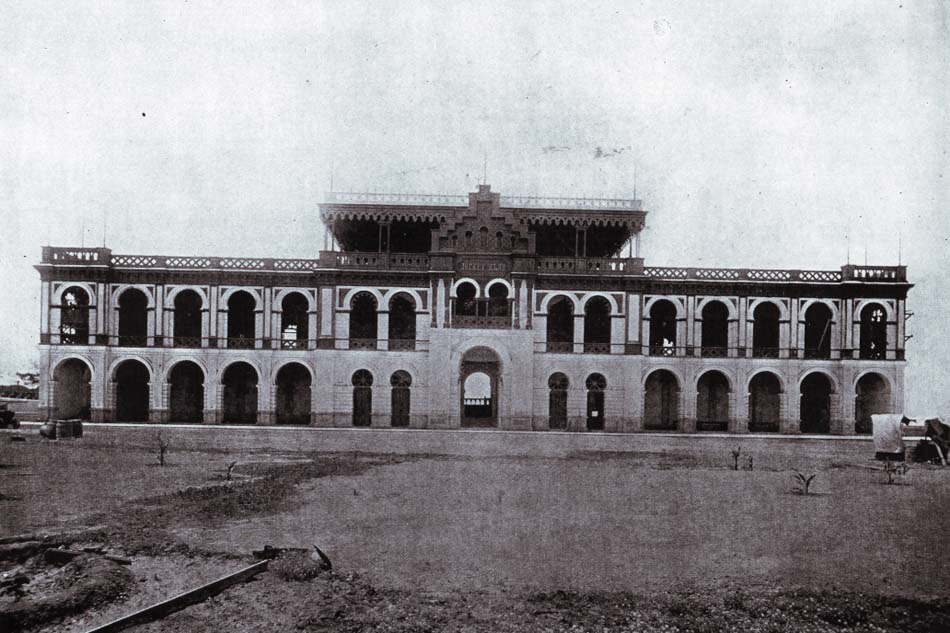
- Photograph by Eugenio Courret
- Location: Lima, Peru
- Owned by: Peruvian State
- Date opened: July 1903
- Date closed: 1938

The Hippodrome of Santa Beatriz (Spanish: Hipódromo de Santa Beatriz) was a hippodrome located in Jesús María District, Lima, Peru. Now almost completely demolished, its former premises are now occupied by El Campo de Marte.

== History ==
The concession for a 99-year emphyteusis was granted by the Municipality of Lima in the estate (fundo) of the same name at the request of the Lima Jockey Club (LJC) during the late 19th century, in exchange for some territory owned by the club in downtown Lima. The Moorish Revival racecourse was then inaugurated in July of 1903 under the tenure of Alfredo Benavides Diez-Canseco (then president of the LJC), operating until 1938, with its golden age coinciding with the Centennial of the Independence of Peru (and that of the Battle of Ayacucho), from 1921 to 1924. Its construction was directed by engineer Carlos León Carty.

The opening ceremony held in 1903 featured important guests, such as mayor Federico Elguera, who delivered a speech to the packed tribunes, and María Diez Canseco de Benavides (the "godmother" of the ceremony), who broke a Champagne bottle with a hammer to baptise the building as part of the event. Also attending was the diplomatic corps resident in Lima, as well as other government officials.

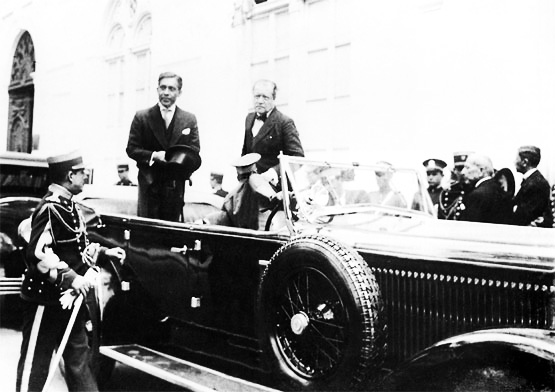
Sánchez Cerro prior to his assassination.

On 30 April 1933, Peruvian President Luis Miguel Sánchez Cerro was shot dead in the racetrack while reviewing troops from the Peruvian Army; 15 days later, his successor, Óscar Benavides, met with the head of the Colombian Liberal Party, Alfonso López Pumarejo, to secure an agreement to turn Leticia over to a League of Nations commission, ending the Colombia–Peru War.

After president Augusto B. Leguía—who had granted territory to the racecourse during his presidency—was ousted from power, the 2,400 m racetrack was reduced to its original 1,600 m length. The city's growth determined the racecourse's fate, with Enrique Ayulo Pardo, then president of the LJC, managing to reach a deal with then president Óscar R. Benavides, where a new racecourse would occupy another territory under the terms of the original lease, while the territories granted for the first hippodrome's construction would be returned to the club.

The terrain chosen for the new racetrack was located next to Salaverry Avenue, where the Hipódromo de San Felipe was built in the fundo of the same name.

== See also ==
- Hipódromo de Monterrico
- El Campo de Marte
