= Hipódromo de Monterrico =

Racecourse in Peru

Coordinates: 12.092787°S 76.977275°W

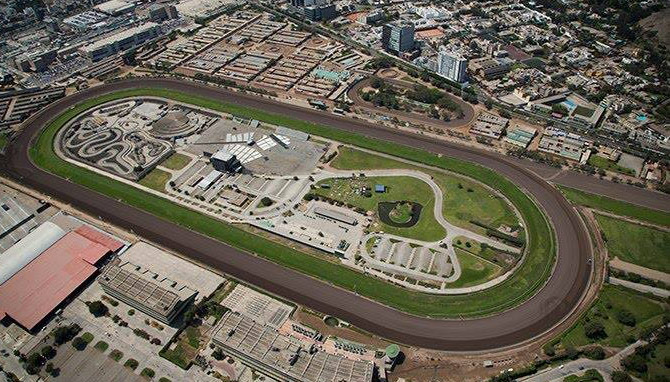
- Aerial view of the racetrack
- Interactive map of Hipódromo de Monterrico
- Location: Santiago de Surco, Lima, Peru
- Owned by: Jockey Club del Perú
- Operated by: Jockey Club del Perú
- Date opened: December 18, 1960
- Capacity: 15,000
- Screened on: Monterrico TV
- Course type: Flat; 1.125 miles (1.811 km) (dirt); 1 mile (1.6 km) (turf)
- Notable races: Polla de Potrillos; Polla de Potrancas; Clásico Ricardo Ortiz de Zevallos; Clásico Enrique Ayulo Pardo; Derby Nacional; Clásico Augusto B. Leguía

The Hipódromo de Monterrico, also known as El Coloso de Surco (lit. 'The colossus of Surco'), is a thoroughbred horse racing complex in Fundo Monterrico Chico, a neighbourhood of Santiago de Surco, Lima, Peru. Since its opening in 1960, it has hosted the annual Quadruple Crown, as well as several other recurring events, such as concerts and fairs. It is located adjacent to the Jockey Plaza shopping centre.

The racetrack is owned and operated by the Jockey Club del Perú, who is also headquartered in the venue. It has a capacity for over 15,000 people, and features a one and one-eight mile dirt racetrack with a one-mile inside track for turf racing, both of which are flat and surround an amusement park and other facilities.

It succeeded the racetrack at San Felipe, whose premises were replaced by a residential complex in the 1960s. Both were preceded by another historic racetrack that functioned from 1903 to 1938 in Santa Beatriz, a residential area located near the city's historic centre. It is one of the country's two horse-racing venues, the other being located in Arequipa.

== History ==
The first plans for the construction of a new racetrack date back to 1951, as the San Felipe Racetrack, located in Jesús María District, had already exceeded its capacity. In 1952, the current land was acquired, and construction began in 1955. It lasted five years and cost $4,500,000 USD at the time. On December 15, 1960, the first meeting of the Jockey Club del Perú (JCP) was held at the new racetrack, and on Sunday, December 18, the new track was inaugurated, hosting afternoon and night races. The first race was won by Weekend, while the first classic (the fifth race of that day) was won by Pensador.

Due to the racetrack's distance from the urban area, five buses were installed in the 1960s, departing from different points in the city (Aviación Avenue and Unanue Street in La Victoria, Plaza San Martín, Plaza Grau, the corner of Arenales Avenue and Javier Prado in San Isidro, and the last one from Schell Street in Miraflores). In the 1980s, a grass track was built next to the racetrack's main track, and its facilities were equipped with closed-circuit television and slot machines.

In the 1990s, during the municipal administration of then Mayor of Lima, Ricardo Belmont Cassinelli, the Hippodrome ceded the northwest area of its jurisdiction for the construction of the Southern Interchange. This system of overpasses consists of two bridges spanning Circunvalación Avenue and the Pan-American Highway (Vía de Evitamiento) over Javier Prado Avenue. In exchange, a direct access expressway to the Hippodrome was built from Javier Prado Avenue.

In 1995, the club's management leased a plot of land that used to house the auxiliary breakaway track and the horse workshop, facing Javier Prado Avenue. The Jockey Plaza was built there, but was sold in 2000 by decision of the members. In 1997, a theme park called Daytona Park opened in the back of the main track, but closed at the end of 2001 due to various reasons and low attendance. That same year, the simulcasting system was inaugurated, although its contract is currently suspended. The infrastructure was renovated that same year, with the electronic race totalizer and electric starter replaced, along with a new computer center for betting.

In 2012, the JCP announced it planned to open a casino at the racecourse later that year.

The club inaugurated its turf track in April 2017.

On May 7, 2021, Peruvian jockey Juan Eugenio Enríquez was thrown off his horse during a 2,000-metre race after the latter fractured his left front leg. The 27-year old was immediately taken to the nearby Clínica Padre Tezza, where he was declared dead, leaving behind a widow and a son. Enríquez was a promiment racer, having won the 2014 Gran Premio Latinoamericano riding the racehorse Lideris. The horse, named Como Cañón, was also euthanised. Sired by Grand Canyon Way, he was foaled in Haras Alydar and trained by Alfonso Arias Rodríguez.

The club's abandoned theme park was eventually replaced in 2026 by another one known as Paradox Park.

== Events ==
Major races at Hipódromo de Monterrico include the four graded stakes dirt races for 3-year-olds that comprise the Peruvian Quadruple Crown:

1. Clásico Polla de Potrillos (GI; colts) and Clásico Polla de Potrancas (GII; fillies) - September, dirt, 1,600 metres. The latter is held on the fifth week of August.
2. Clásico Ricardo Ortiz de Zevallos (GII; colts) and Clásico Enrique Ayulo Pardo (GII; fillies) - October, dirt, 2,000 metres.
3. Derby Nacional (GI) - Held on the first week of November. Dirt, 2,400 metres.
4. Gran Premio Nacional Augusto B. Leguía (GI) - February, turf, 2,600 metres.

Other races include the Grade I Clásico Jockey Club del Perú, the Gran Premio Latinoamericano, and the Clásico Pamplona; the Grade II Clásico Independencia (held since 1919) the Clásico Ciudad de Lima, the Clásico Enrique Meiggs, and the Clásico Presidente de la República; as well as several non-graded races.

=== Other uses ===
Other than horse racing, the venue is also used for other events such as concerts and sports events, like the Lima Challenger. Notable concerts include:

- Shakira (2003)
- Kansas (2009)
- Laura Pausini (2009)
- 50 Cent (2009)
- Camilo Sesto (2009)
- Pet Shop Boys (2009)
- Tokio Hotel (2010)
- Stomp (2010)
- Backstreet Boys (2011)
- Paramore (2011)
- Camilo Sesto (2011)
- Selena Gomez - We Own the Night Tour (2012)
- Joe Cocker (2012)
- Robert Plant (2012)
- Morrissey (2012)
- New Kids on the Block (2012)
- Il Divo - Il Divo & Orchestra in Concert – World Tour (2012)
- Big Time Rush - Big Time Summer Tour (2012)
- The Wanted - Code Tour (2012)
- Laura Pausini - Inedito World Tour (2012)
- Demi Lovato - A Special Night with Demi Lovato (2012)
- Big Bang - Alive Galaxy Tour (2012)
- Super Junior - Super Show 5 Tour (2013)
- U-KISS - U-KISS Latinoamérica Tour (2013)
- Miguel Bosé (2013)
- Ringo Starr (2013)
- Violetta - Violetta en Vivo (2013)
- Morrissey (2013)
- Raphael (2014)
- Ed Sheeran - x Tour (2015)
- Katy Perry - Prismatic World Tour (2015)
- Violetta - Violetta Live (2015)
- 5 Seconds of Summer (2017)
- Soy Luna - Soy Luna en Concierto (2017)
- Katy Perry & Bebe Rexha - Witness: The Tour (2018)
- Super Junior - Super Show 7 Tour (2018)
- Phil Collins - Not Dead Yet Tour (2018)
- Soy Luna - Soy Luna en Vivo (2018)
- The Killers - Wonderful Wonderful World Tour (2018)
- Laura Pausini - Fatti Sentire World Tour (2018)
- Judas Priest - Firepower World Tour (2018)
- Luis Miguel - México Por Siempre Tour (2019)
- Arctic Monkeys - Tranquility Base Hotel & Casino Tour (2019)
- Lenny Kravitz - Raise Vibration Tour (2019)
- Muse - Simulation Theory World Tour (2019)
- Shawn Mendes - Shawn Mendes: The Tour (2019)
- Rauw Alejandro - Vice Versa Tour (2022)
- Ricardo Arjona - Blanco y Negro: Tour (2022)
- Maluma - Papi Juancho Tour (2022)
- Road to Ultra 2022

A cosplay event inspired by the Umamusume: Pretty Derby franchise was held on February 27, 2026. The first of its kind in Latin America, it was named after Peruvian racehorse Santorín.

== See also ==
- Hipódromo de San Felipe
- Hipódromo de Santa Beatriz
