= Gate of Lima =

Former landmark in Lima

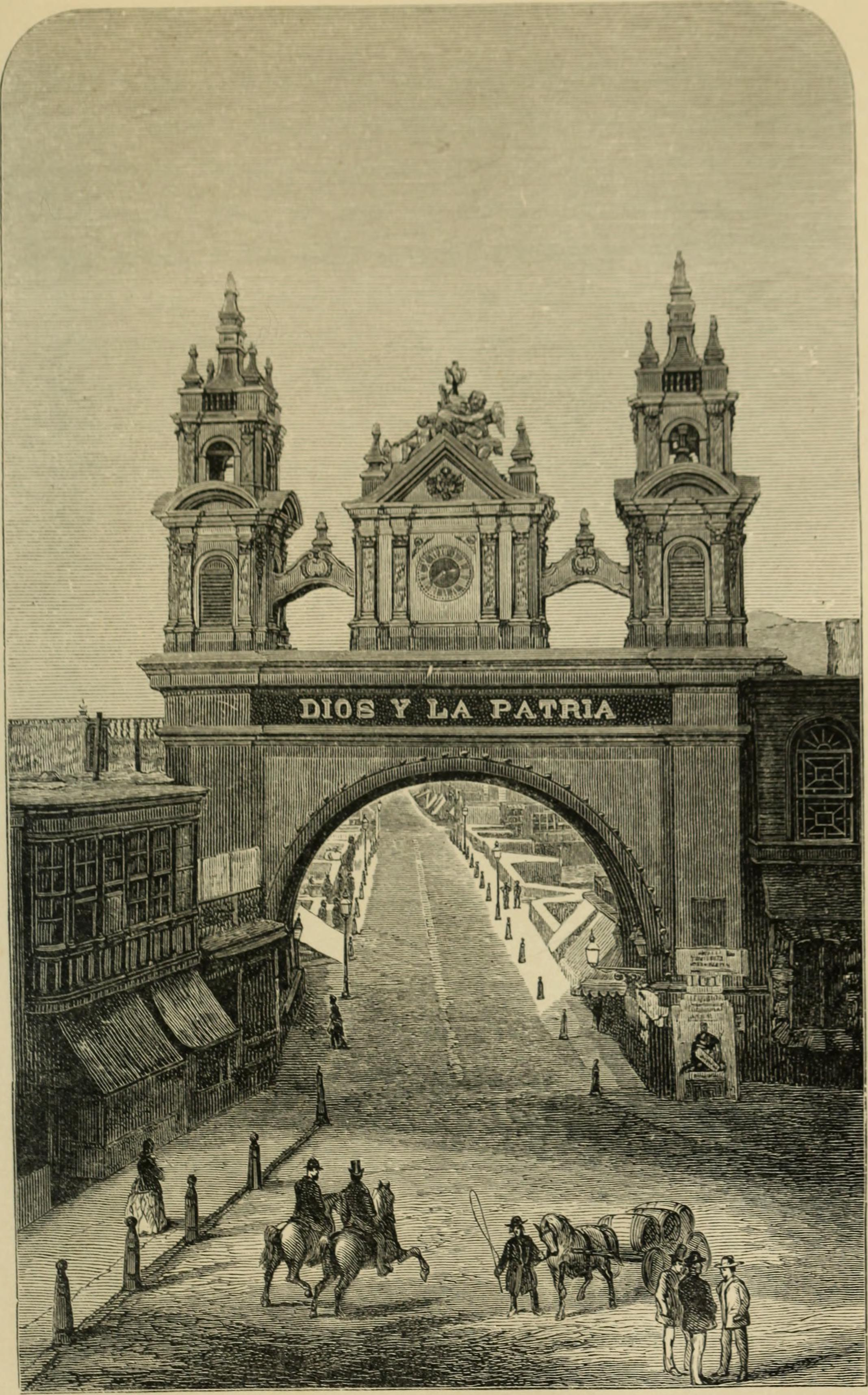
- Engraving based on an 1872 photograph
- Interactive map of the Gate of Lima area

General information
- Coordinates: 12.04381775°S 77.02982765°W
- Inaugurated: 1700
- Destroyed: April 10, 1879

The Gate of Lima (Spanish: Portada de Lima; Arco del Puente) was a monumental gate in the historic centre of Lima, Peru. Built in 1700, it was located on the southern end of Trujillo Bridge, which connected the neighbourhood of San Lázaro with central Lima. It was burned down on April 10, 1879, by the Chilean baker Cornelio Granados, five days after the War of the Pacific formally began between Chile and Peru.

A project by PROLIMA, an agency of the Metropolitan Municipality of Lima, intends to rebuild the structure at its original site.

== History ==
=== Context ===
The gate coexisted with several other gates that existed as part of the city's defensive walls, demolished during the late 19th century under the government of José Balta. The walls had ten gates in total: Barbones, Callao, Cocharcas, Maravillas, Martinete, Monserrate, Guadalupe, Juan Simón, San Jacinto, and Santa Catalina.

=== Gate ===
The arch was a stone and brick structure that stood on the south side of the Puente de Piedra, in front of the Royal Houses (Casas Reales). It was built in the Plazuela de Los Desamparados in 1700 during the government of Viceroy Melchor Portocarrero Lasso de la Vega. In 1738, a bronze statue of King Philip V, made by the sculptor Baltazar Gavilán, was installed at the top. This installation is described by Ricardo Palma in his book Peruvian Traditions.

The arch broke down on several occasions due to several earthquakes that devastated the city. In the earthquake of 1746, the statue of the Spanish monarch was destroyed and the arch was left in a ruinous state. In the 1760s, during the government of Viceroy Manuel de Amat y Junyent, the structure was repaired and the clock in one of the towers of the church of San Pedro was installed in the place where a statue of Our Lady of Bethlehem had been. A sandglass was installed where the statue of Philip V had been.

In 1852, during the presidency of José Rufino Echenique, a new monumental clock illuminated from the inside and visible from both sides, which was donated by the Jesuits, was installed.

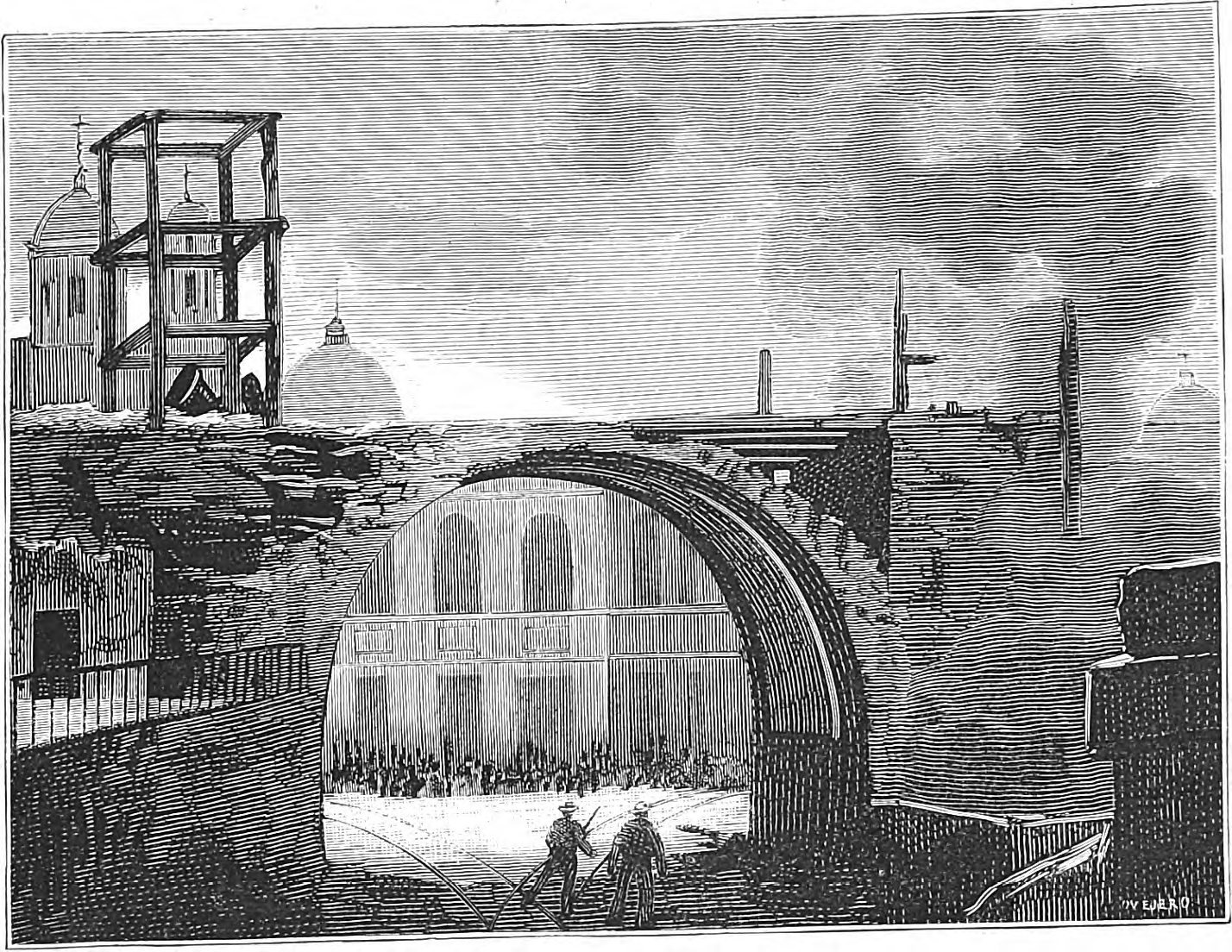
The destroyed gate, as seen in La Ilustración Española y Americana.

During the Republic, the arch was abandoned and entered into a certain decline. Only until 1868, during the government of José Balta, was the arch restored. However, just over a decade later, both the clock and the oak wood from which the arch was made were destroyed when a fire started by the Chilean baker Cornelio Granados consumed them in the early hours of April 10, 1879. His wife, Maiz Sara Bossellar, a Dutch woman who was the daughter of a refiner at an hacienda in Palpa and had married him before the age of 15, left him as a result.

=== Legacy and revival ===
A replica of the gate was built in Santa Leonor, an agricultural estate in Chorrillos District.

The bridge's gate is the subject of a project by PROLIMA, an agency of the Metropolitan Municipality of Lima, headed by archaeologist Ernesto Olazo. The project aims to restore both the gate's foundational structure, located underground, as well as the Molino de Aliaga, located on the same block.

== See also ==
- Walls of Lima
