= Jirón Puno =

Street in Lima, Peru

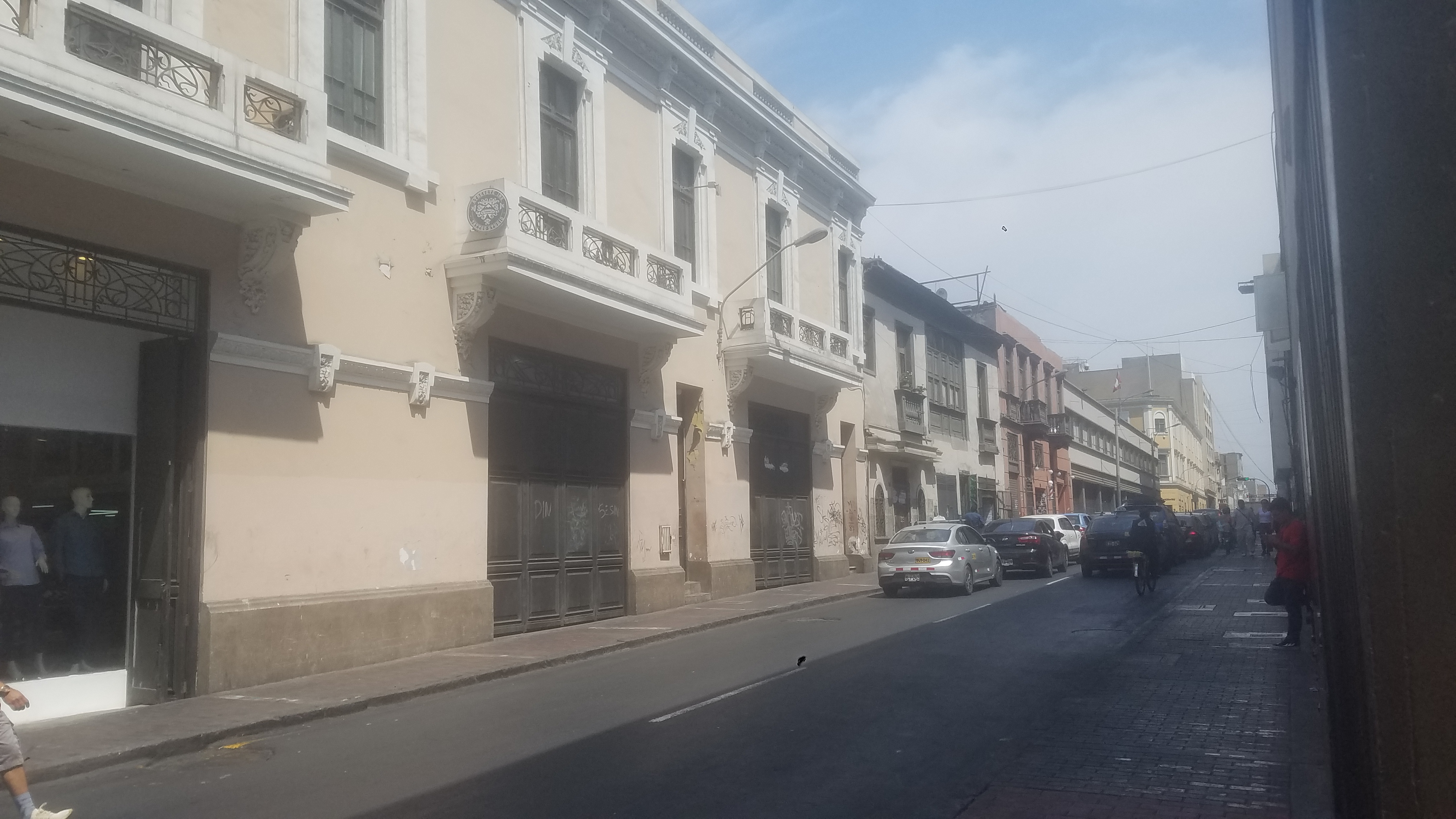
- View of the street's first block
- Part of: Damero de Pizarro
- Namesake: Department of Puno
- From: Jirón de la Unión
- Major junctions: Carabaya, Lampa, Azángaro, Ayacucho, Andahuaylas, Paruro, Huanta, Cangallo, Huamanga, La Mar, Lucanas and Huánuco streets, Abancay Avenue
- To: Jirón Lorenzo de Vidaurre

Construction
- Completion: 1535

Jirón Puno is a major street in the Damero de Pizarro, located in the historic centre of Lima, Peru. It starts in the Jirón de la Unión and continues until it reaches Jirón Lorenzo de Vidaurre in Barrios Altos. It is continued by Jirón Moquegua to the west.

== History ==
The road that today constitutes the street was laid by Francisco Pizarro when he founded the city of Lima on January 18, 1535. In 1862, when a new urban nomenclature was adopted, the road was named jirón Puno, after Puno Department. Prior to this renaming, each block (cuadra) had a unique name:

- Block 1: Bejarano, until 1862, later known as de Mantequería de Boza, the latter after the creamery operated by the noble family of the same name.
- Block 2: Pregonería (Vieja), after the town criery located there.
- Block 3: Azaña, after the family of the same name.
- Block 4: Padre Jerónimo, after Spanish friar Diego Cisneros, OSH, who in Spain had been confessor for Maria Luisa of Parma.
- Block 5: Juan Valiente (Santa Teresa), after the convent of the same name, inaugurated on November 21, 1696, and abolished for its low number of nuns, who were moved to the nearby Monastery of Carmen Alto.
- Block 6: Santa Catalina, after the plazuela and monastery of the same name.
- Block 7–14: Chirimoyo, after the orchard of the same name.

The street is the location of buildings such as the headquarters of the Geographical Society of Lima and of Dos de Mayo National Hospital. It has also housed presidents of Peru José de la Riva Agüero, Guillermo Billinghurst and José Pardo y Barreda.

In 2015, a fire burned down a two-storey house located on the street's fourth block. A similar event occurred in 2016. A number of fires have also taken place in nearby Mesa Redonda, notably that of 2001, and most recently in late 2023.

== See also ==
- Historic Centre of Lima
