= Church of Nuestra Señora de Copacabana =

Church in Rímac, Peru

Coordinates: 12°02′21″S 77°01′39″W

Church of Our Lady of Copacabana
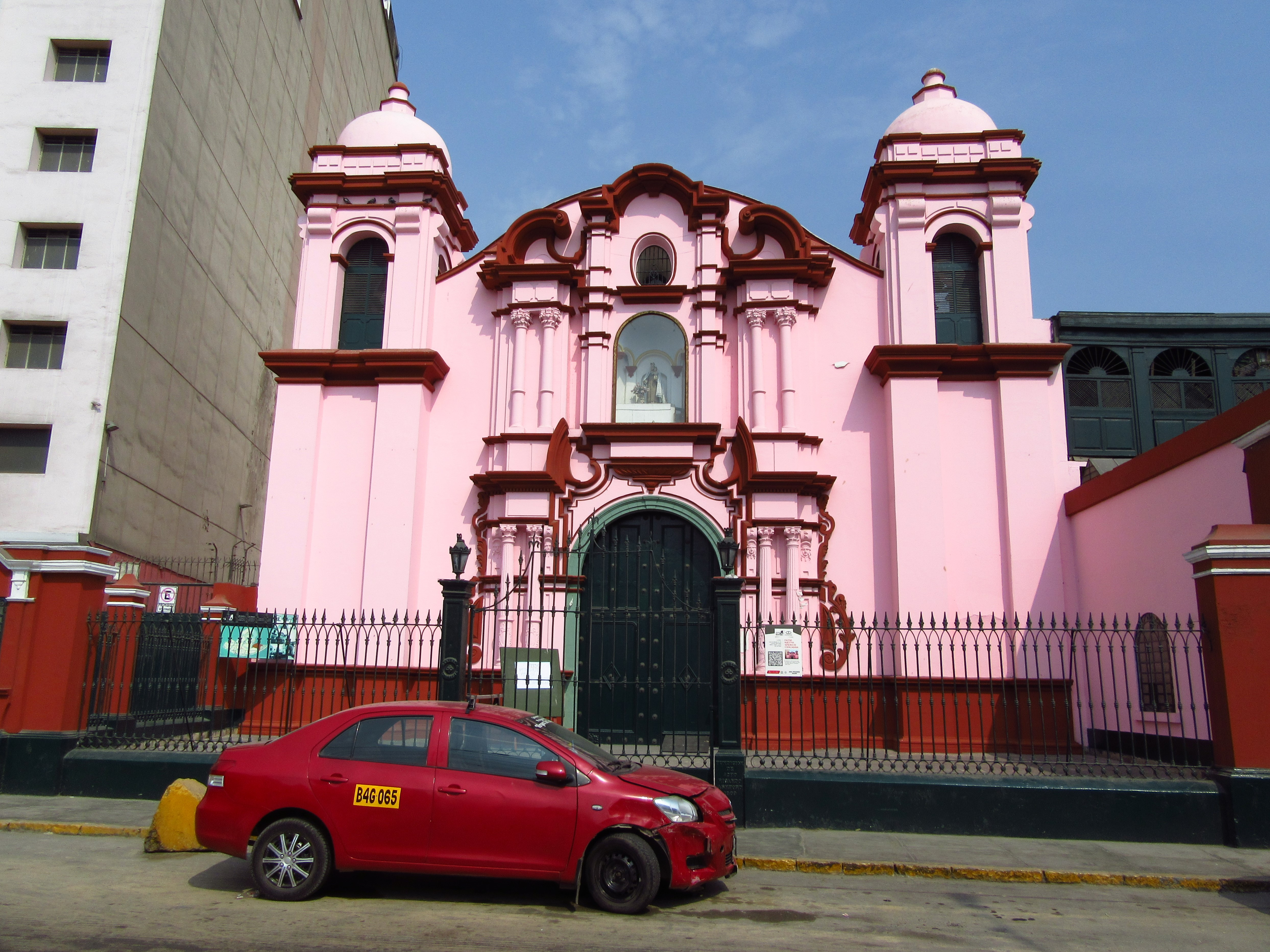
- Church of Our Lady of Copacabana
- Country: Peru
- Denomination: Roman Catholic

Architecture
- Style: Baroque
- Years built: 1740s

Administration
- Diocese: Lima

The Church of Our Lady of Copacabana (Spanish: Iglesia de Nuestra Señora de Copacabana) is a Catholic temple located in Rímac District, part of the historic centre of Lima, Peru.

== History ==
Its first vestiges date back to the final years of the 16th century. At that time the image of the Virgin Mary was already venerated at the Iglesia de Copacabana del Cercado by the residents of what was then the neighbourhood of Cercado. Between 1617 and 1629, a hermitage with a rectangular floor plan was established with niches. In the middle of the century, the assembler Asensio de Salas designed and built a baroque façade with prominent entablatures. This devotion is due to the early expansion of devotion to the image that is venerated in Copacabana, Bolivia, located near Lake Titicaca.

The earthquake of 1678 seriously affected the structure and the earthquake of 1687 destroyed it. In the same place, the viceroy ordered the construction of a temple, which expanded the veneration of the Virgin of Copacabana.

The earthquake of 1746 left the building in ruins again. With the help of the income from the brotherhood and the devotees, the current temple was built, which included the construction of two bell towers. In turn, the body of the church is shaped like a Latin cross with short arms and a dressing room is added behind the front wall.

In 2020, the Metropolitan Municipality of Lima restored the façade of the church. The restoration revealed an inscription in Latin that says that the cover was designed by the assembler Asensio de Salas, who subcontracted the stonemason Alonso de Cortinas to carve the stone.

== See also ==
- Historic Centre of Lima
