= PROLIMA =

Peruvian government programme

Municipal Programme for the Recovery of the Historic Centre of Lima
- Programa Municipal para la Recuperación del Centro Histórico de Lima

Agency overview
- Formed: July 13, 1994
- Preceding Agency: Junta Deliberante Metropolitana
- Jurisdiction: Historic Centre of Lima
- Headquarters: Casa del Rastro, Jirón Áncash, Lima
- Agency executive: Luis Martín Bogdanovich Mendoza, Manager
- Parent Agency: Metropolitan Municipality of Lima

The Municipal Programme for the Recovery of the Historic Centre of Lima (Spanish: Programa Municipal para la Recuperación del Centro Histórico de Lima), also known by its acronym PROLIMA, is an organisation of the Peruvian government aimed at the recovery (i.e. restoration) of the historic centre of Lima, both in its declared Cultural heritage of Peru status in 1972 (covering 10.77 km^{2}) and as a World Heritage Site of UNESCO in 1991 (covering 2.53 km^{2}).

It was in charge of the formulation and coordinates the implementation of the "Master Plan" of the city (Spanish: Plan Maestro del Centro Histórico de Lima al 2029 con visión al 2035), a regulatory technical document approved by the Municipality of Lima and the Ministry of Culture of Peru, whose objective is to recover habitable conditions of the city's historic centre within UNESCO's guidelines.

In 2024, the organisation announced Lima, Ciudad de los Reyes, a brand designed to attract foreign investments and tourism, similar to the Peru Brand of the Ministry of Foreign Trade and Tourism.

== Gallery ==
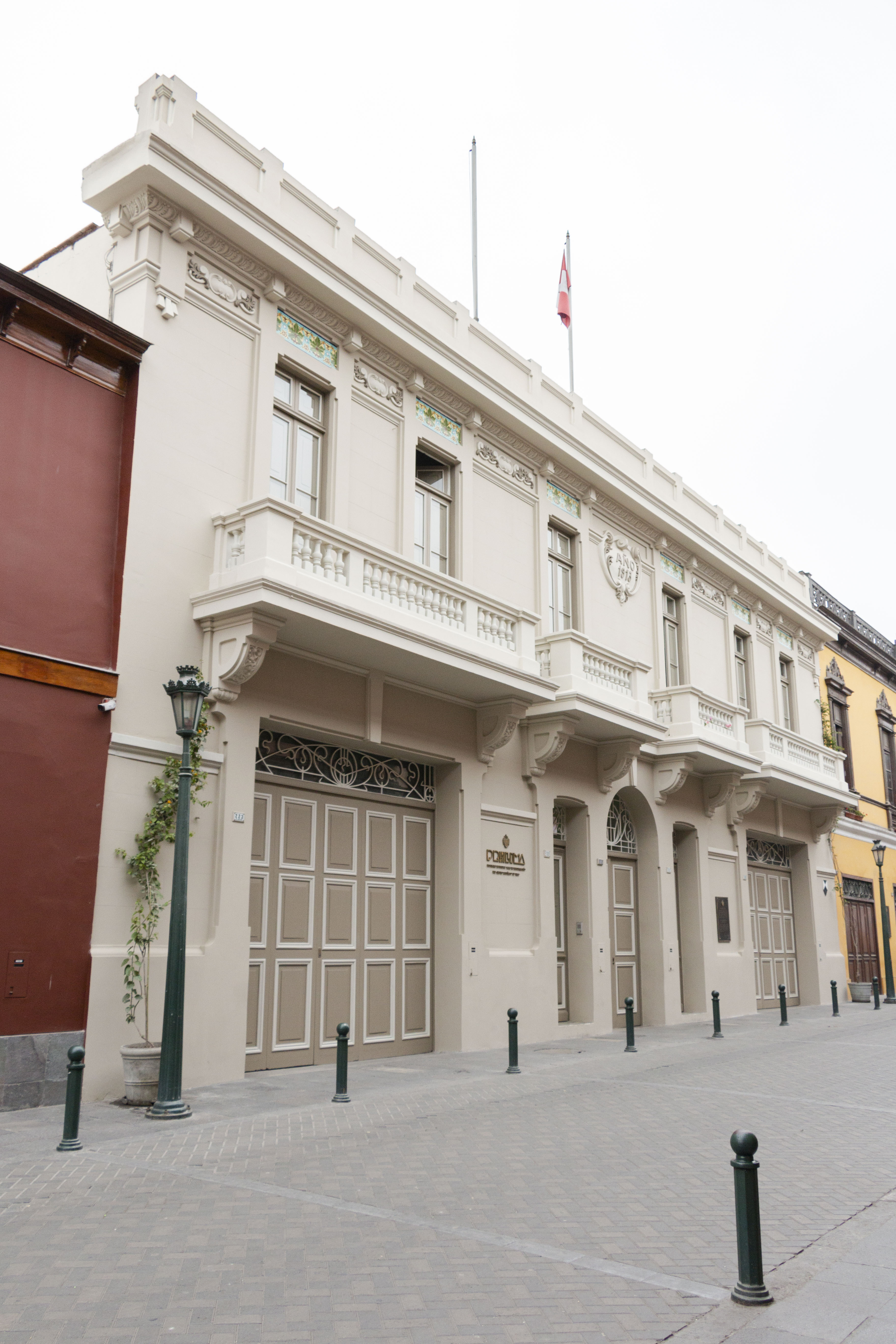
Main building at first block of Ancash street

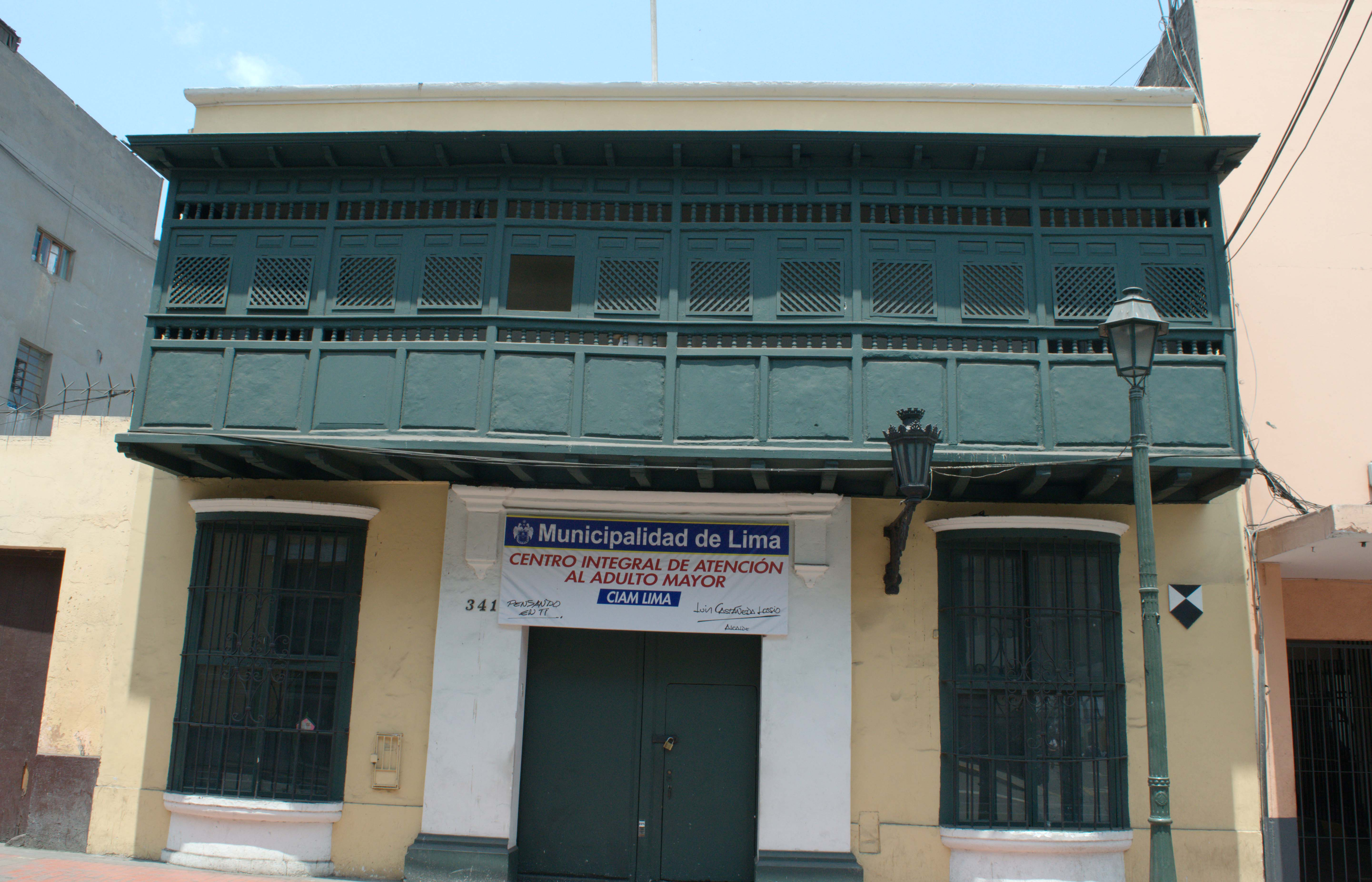
Cultural centre at Count of Superunda street

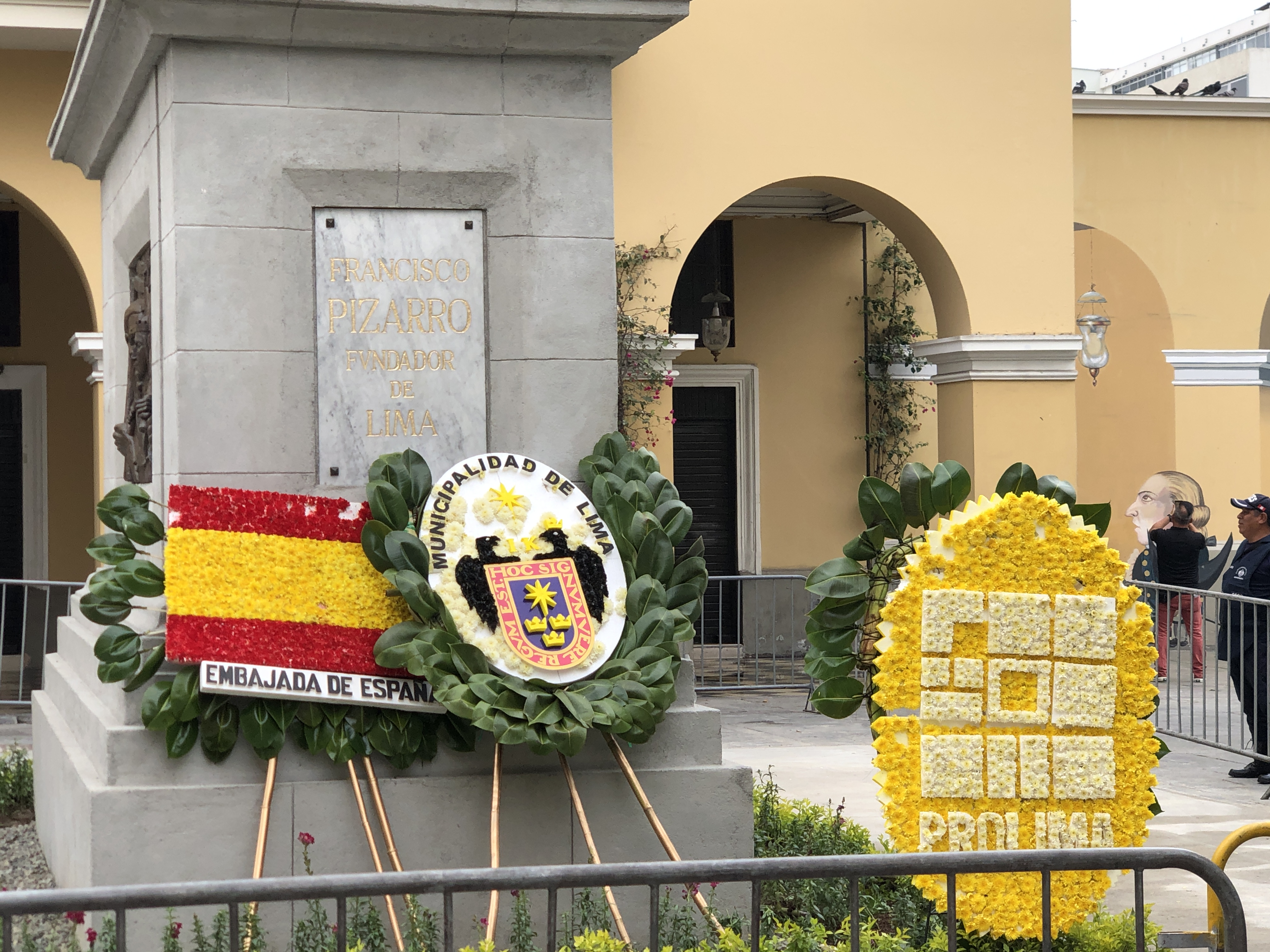
Logo next to the statue of Pizarro

== See also ==
- Municipality of Lima
- Cercado de Lima
- Barrios Altos
