= Jirón Callao =

Street in Lima, Peru

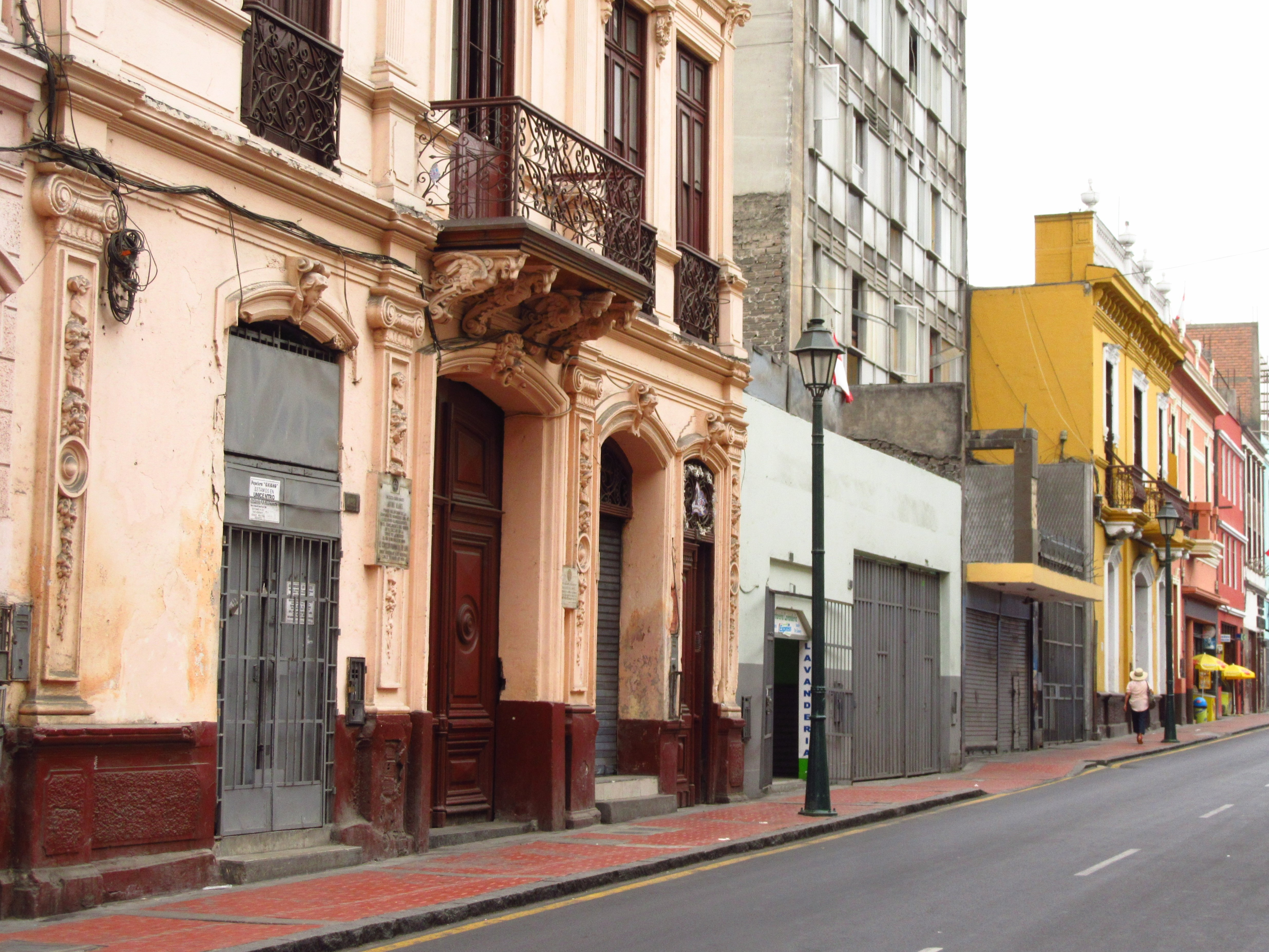
- Intersection with Tacna Avenue
- Part of: Damero de Pizarro
- Namesake: Callao
- From: Jirón Sancho de Rivera
- Major junctions: Tacna Avenue
- To: Jirón de la Unión

Construction
- Completion: 1535

Jirón Callao is a major street in the Damero de Pizarro, located in the historic centre of Lima, Peru. The street starts at its intersection with the Jirón Sancho de Rivera and continues until it reaches the Jirón de la Unión, next to the Plaza de Armas.

== History ==
The road that today constitutes the street was laid by Francisco Pizarro when he founded the city of Lima on January 18, 1535. Until the 16th century, this road only had six blocks, the last two being formed at the beginning of the 17th century. This street had the particularity of being the gateway of the viceroys to the city. Thus, on the occasion of the entry of a new viceroy to the city, a welcoming ceremony was held in the last block of this road (current sixth block). Previously, the viceroy spent the night in the Monserrate Convent which was located two blocks further west (current eighth block) and the next day they entered the city. The first viceroy to receive this ceremony was Martín Enríquez de Almanza in 1581 and this custom lasted until 1801 when viceroy Gabriel de Avilés y del Fierro arrived, that is, 42 viceroys over 220 years were received on this street.

In 1573 the Hospital del Espíritu Santo was built by Mr. Miguel de Acosta, which would be one of the first hospitals built in the city. In the 17th century, this same road would house the residence of Isabel Flores de Oliva, better known as Saint Rose of Lima.

In 1862, when a new urban nomenclature was adopted, the road was named jirón Callao, after the Constitutional Province. Prior to this renaming, each block (cuadra) had a unique name:

- Block 1: Mantas, for the large number of stores that sold blankets and other such items.
- Block 2: Valladolid, after the confectionery and warehouse establishment of Pedro de Valladolid y Florin which existed in the 17th century.
- Block 3: Mármol de bronce, after the marble pool that, with a bronze pipe, supplied water to the population. It is also home to Casa Barbieri, the former residence of the counts of Villar de Fuentes.
- Block 4: Mórtua, a bastardisation of "Lórtua" (possibly also "Olaórtua"), taken from Lucía de Lórtua, who lived there in the 19th century.
- Block 5: Espíritu Santo, after the hospital of the same name built in 1573.
- Block 6: Arco, after the triumphal arch that welcomed the new viceroys into the city.
- Block 7: La Milla, after Baltazar de Lamilla, who lived there.
- Block 8: Monserrate, after the convent of the same name, built in the early 17th century, where the new viceroys slept before entering the city.

On July 29, 2020, a fire at the street's ninth block affected 60 families, who were moved to the Plaza Montserrate. On October 16, 2023, another fire was reported at the street's intersection with the Jirón Cailloma.

== See also ==
- Historic Centre of Lima
