= Geographical Society of Lima =

Geographic agency in Lima, Peru

- Sociedad Geográfica de Lima
- Abbreviation: SGL
- Formation: February 22, 1888; 138 years ago
- Headquarters: Jirón Puno 450, Barrios Altos
- Location: Lima, Peru
- Website: socgeolima.org.pe

The Geographical Society of Lima (Spanish: Sociedad Geográfica de Lima, SGL) is a scientific institution and geographical society based in Lima, Peru, founded in 1888. It has a library of ancient works and publishes works of geographical significance. It was founded with the purpose of collecting materials to support the defense of territorial rights disputed by neighbouring countries, something of great importance at the time of its foundation, and currently studies national geography and natural resources, determining the best routes for the construction of land roads and promoting immigration, as well as forming and preserving a geographical library, and maintaining correspondence with analogous societies in the world. It awards decorations to those who make significant contributions to the knowledge of the reality of Peru.

== History ==
It was created by supreme decree of February 22, 1888, given by the first government of Andrés Avelino Cáceres. This, in one of his messages to the National Congress, stated:

In order to achieve goals of obvious importance, the Government has organized a geographical society destined to constitute a center of useful enlightenment for the country, which will contribute not only to administrative efficiency and regularity with the study of the appropriate demarcation of the republic, but to also seek the necessary and fruitful flow of immigration, exhibiting with the testimony of respectable authority, the exuberant riches of our extensive and varied territory...

The newspaper El Comercio, in its edition of February 24, 1888, outlined the importance of its foundation:

The decree of the 22nd fills a need that has been claimed for a long time; Its importance is proven by more than one treaty that Peru has concluded with neighboring states, in which the incredible ignorance of our signatory ministers has caused the country to lose vast and rich territories for not having been aware of the limits of the Republic.

It was Luis Carranza, a prominent doctor, journalist and politician from Ayacucho, who promoted its creation, being its second director, a position he held for ten years.

Among its founding members were illustrious personalities such as Eduardo de Habich, Antonio Raimondi, Ernest Malinowski, Camilo Carrillo, Pedro Paz Soldán y Unanue, Aurelio García y García, Modesto Basadre, Guillermo Billinghurst, José Granda Esquivel, Ernst Middendorf, José Toribio Polo, Teodorico Olaechea, among others. Ex officio members were the senior officer of the Ministry of Foreign Affairs, the director of the School of Engineers, the general director of Telegraphs, the director of the Naval School and the professor of geography of the Guadalupe School.

It emerged as dependent on the Ministry of Foreign Affairs and its statutes were approved by supreme resolution of July 20, 1892. It operated on the upper floors of the National Library of Peru in Abancay Avenue, suffering serious damage during the fire of 1943.

Because at that time there were almost no scientific centres in Peru, the Society absorbed the activity of a few men of science and attracted the most select cultivators of the study of the various geographical disciplines, thus concentrating within it the most select intellectuality of the country.

== Directors ==
Since its founding, the Society has had well-known intellectuals from various specialties as presidents.

- Leonardo Pflucker y Rico (1888)
- Luis Carranza (1889–1898)
- Ricardo Flores Gaviño (1898–1899)
- Counter admiral Melitón Carvajal Ambulodegui (1899–1900, 1919–1935)
- Eulogio Delgado (1900–1913)
- José Balta Paz (1913–1918)
- Manuel Montero y Tirado (1918–1919)
- Horacio H. Urteaga (1935–1943)
- Carlos Morales Macedo (1943–1945)
- Emilio Romero Padilla (1945–1948, 1958–1979)
- Counter admiral Felipe Rotalde (1949)
- Óscar Miró Quesada de la Guerra (1950–1955)
- Aurelio Miró Quesada Sosa (1955–1957)
- Counter admiral Manuel R. Nieto (1957–1958)
- General Bernardino G. Vallenas (1980–1982)
- Gustavo Lama Arredondo (1982–1986)
- Santiago Antúnez de Mayolo Rynning (1986–1992)
- Ernesto Paredes Arana (1993–1998)
- Eduardo Bedoya Lazarte (1999–2001)
- Counter admiral (r) Raúl Parra Maza (2001–2007)
- Santiago Antúnez de Mayolo Rynning (2008–2012)
- Zaniel Novoa Goicochea (2012–2016)
- Nicole Bernex Weiss (2016–2022)
- María del Carmen Carrasco Coello (2022–present)

== See also ==
- National Geographic Institute (Peru)
