= Catacombs of Lima =

Underground ossuary in Lima, Peru

- Catacumbas de Lima
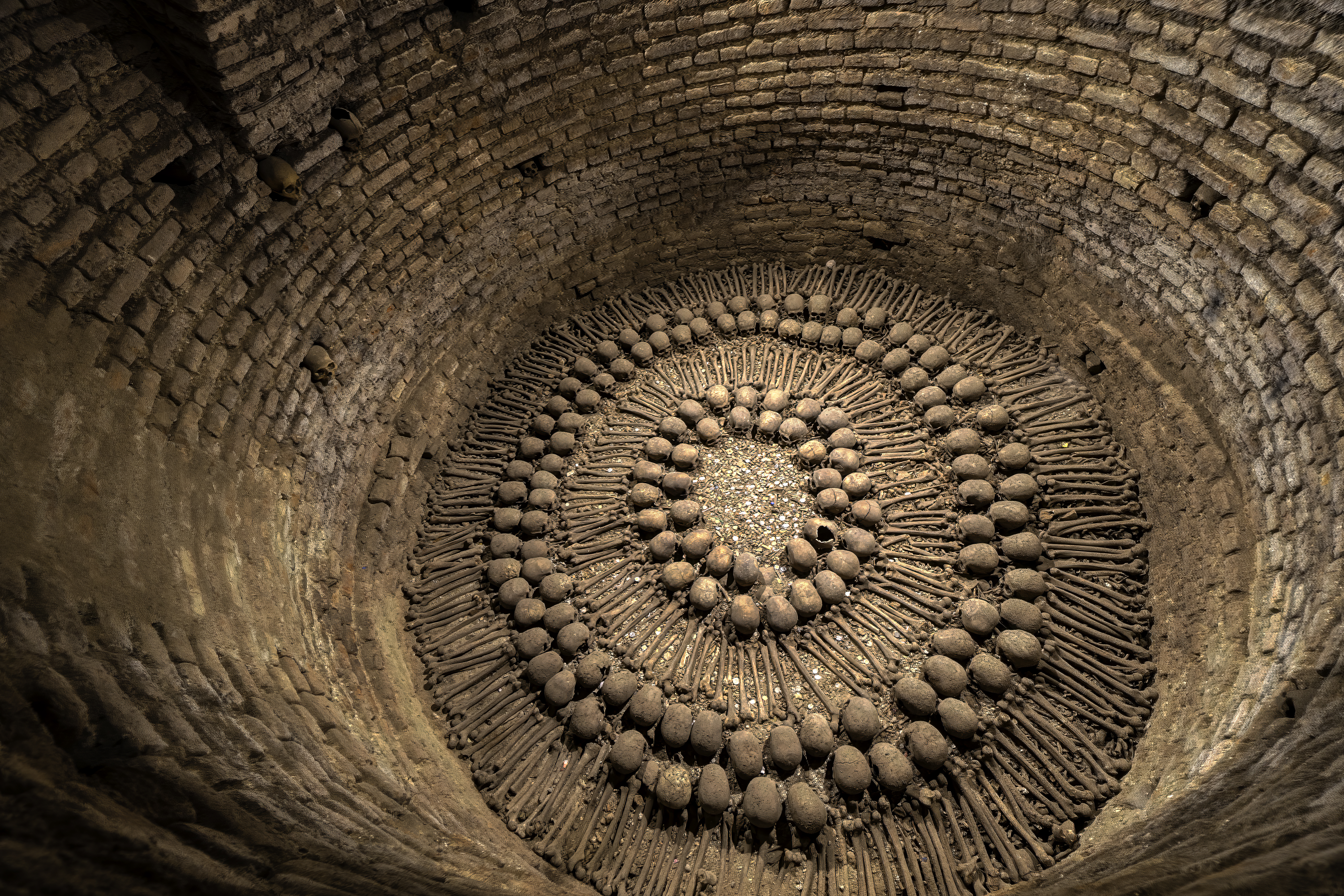
- Human remains in the catacombs
- Established: c. 1600
- Location: San Francisco Convent, Lima, Peru
- Type: Historic site
- Collections: Ossuary contents of Lima's viceregal catacombs
- Website: museocatacumbas.com

The Catacombs of Lima (Spanish: Catacumbas de Lima) are underground ossuaries in the historic centre of Lima, Peru. The catacombs were built under the Basilica and Convent of San Francisco and currently function as a museum.

== History ==
In 1546, the Franciscan order began construction of the Basilica and Convent of San Francisco in Lima, which included the catacombs, built to support the convent in the event of an earthquake. The crypt's use as a cemetery continued for almost the entirety of the Spanish era of Peru, stopping in 1810 with some 25,000 bodies lying within.

After the Peruvian War of Independence, the cemetery's use was banned by General José de San Martín, with the area being closed off soon after. It would not be reopened until 1950, now working as a museum. It was closed a second time during the COVID-19 pandemic in Peru

The total area of the underground complex is not known, as it does not limit itself to the convent but continues to other landmarks in Lima, connecting the convent to the Government Palace, the Legislative Palace and the Alameda de los Descalzos on the other side of the Rímac river. Other tunnels led to the Puente de Piedra and the Casa de Aliaga.

In 1981, attempts to map the entirety of the complex led to the aforementioned conclusion of the total area being unknown. In addition to the tunnels that led to other points of the capital's centre, a crypt that possibly worked as an ammo depot (although another hypothesis links it to the Desamparados Church, built by Viceroy Pedro Antonio Fernández de Castro, 10th Count of Lemos) was also found. According to experts commissioned by the Peruvian State, the tunnels' likely purpose was protection against piracy of the area's locals and safekeeping of valuables.

The San Francisco complex, which includes the catacombs, is one of the most important heritage monuments in the historic centre of Lima, which was declared on December 9, 1988, as a World Heritage Site by UNESCO.

== Notable burials ==
- Constantino de Vasconcellos
- Manuel de Oms, 24th Viceroy of Peru and 1st Marquess of Castelldosrius
- García Sarmiento de Sotomayor, 16th Viceroy of Peru and 2nd Count of Salvatierra
- Fr. Juan Gómez, personal nurse of Francis Solanus, known due to Ricardo Palma's Tradiciones Peruanas
- Fr. Ramón y Tagle y Bracho, son of José Bernardo de Tagle y Bracho, 1st Marquis of Torre Tagle
- Fr. Andrés Corso, who was born in Corsica and died in the convent on June 10, 1620
- Fr. José Francisco de Guadalupe Mojica, O.F.M.

== See also ==
- Historic Centre of Lima
- List of World Heritage Sites in Peru
