= Banco del Perú y Londres =

Peruvian bank

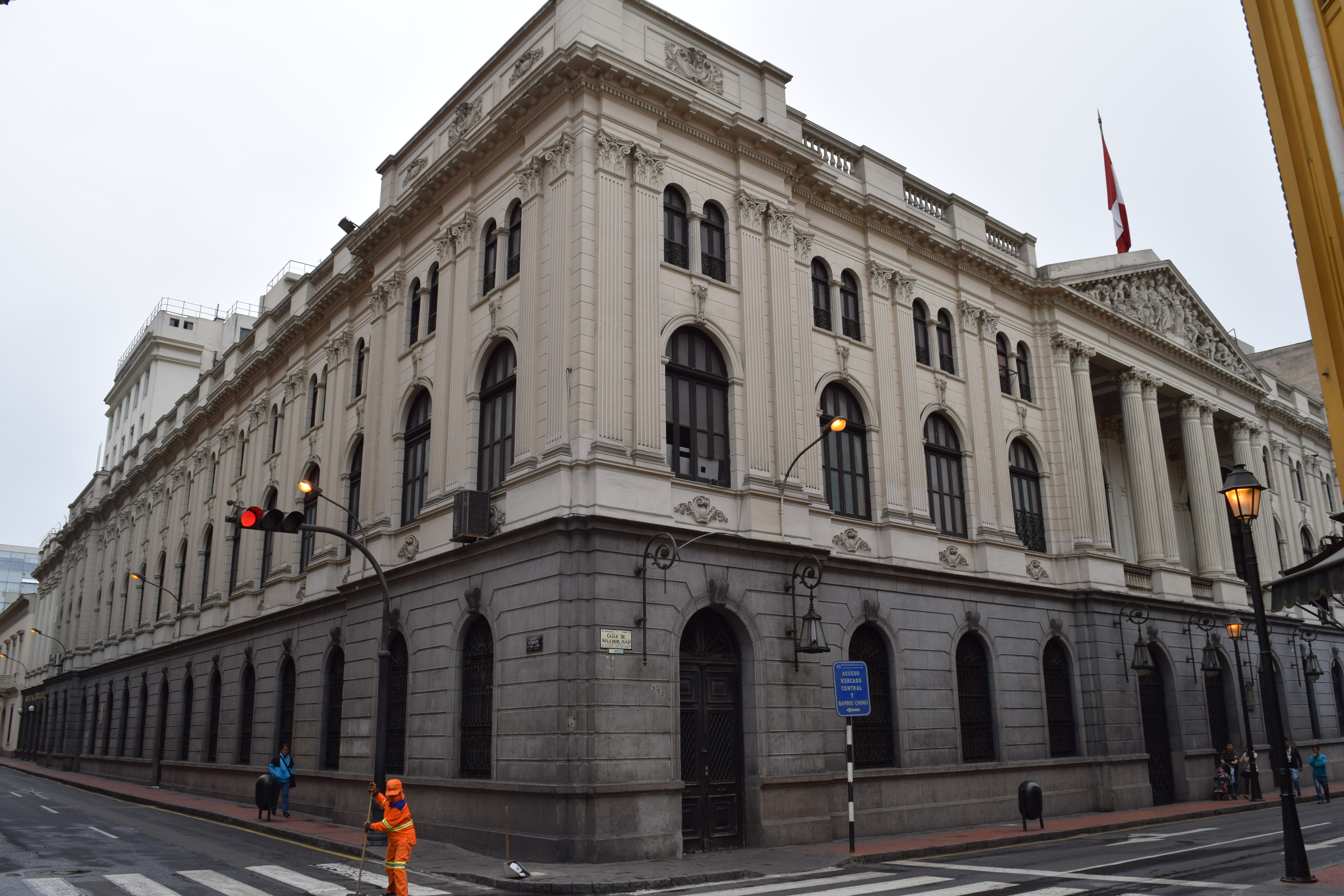
- Company type: Public
- Industry: Financial services
- Founded: 1897 in Lima, Peru
- Founder: Augusto Wiese Eslava
- Defunct: 1931
- Headquarters: Lima, Peru

The Banco del Perú y Londres (Bank of London and Peru) was a British–Peruvian bank headquartered in Lima during the early 20th century. Its former headquarters, located at the city's historic centre are now a building owned by the Congress of Peru, named after Luis Alberto Sánchez.

== History ==
The bank was established in 1897 through the merging of the Bank of Callao (Banco del Callao) and The London Bank of Mexico And South America, headquartered in Mexico City, to extend the former's operations. The merge with the bank in Callao, created in 1877, was proposed by Cuban economist José Payán, whose company had entered into a crisis following the War of the Pacific.

The bank's building was designed by architect Julio Ernesto Lattini in 1905, commissioned by Payán. It was later acquired by the Banco Popular del Perú.

It was later operated by Pablo La Rosa and stood out as a South American economic centre with foreign capital. This bank had branches in other cities in the country, and at the time it was one of the institutions most closely linked to the country's economy, because it offered loans to the government. By 1921 he obtained S/. 123 million in assets.

However, due to the political crisis during the Military Junta of 1930, it caused its bankruptcy in 1931, which led to a financial crisis. It competed with the Banco de Crédito and the Banco Continental, which survived after its liquidation by having foreign participation.
