= Church of Our Lady of Mount Carmel, Lima =

Church in Lima, Peru

Church and Monastery of Our Lady of Mount Carmel
- Iglesia y Monasterio de Nuestra Señora del Carmen
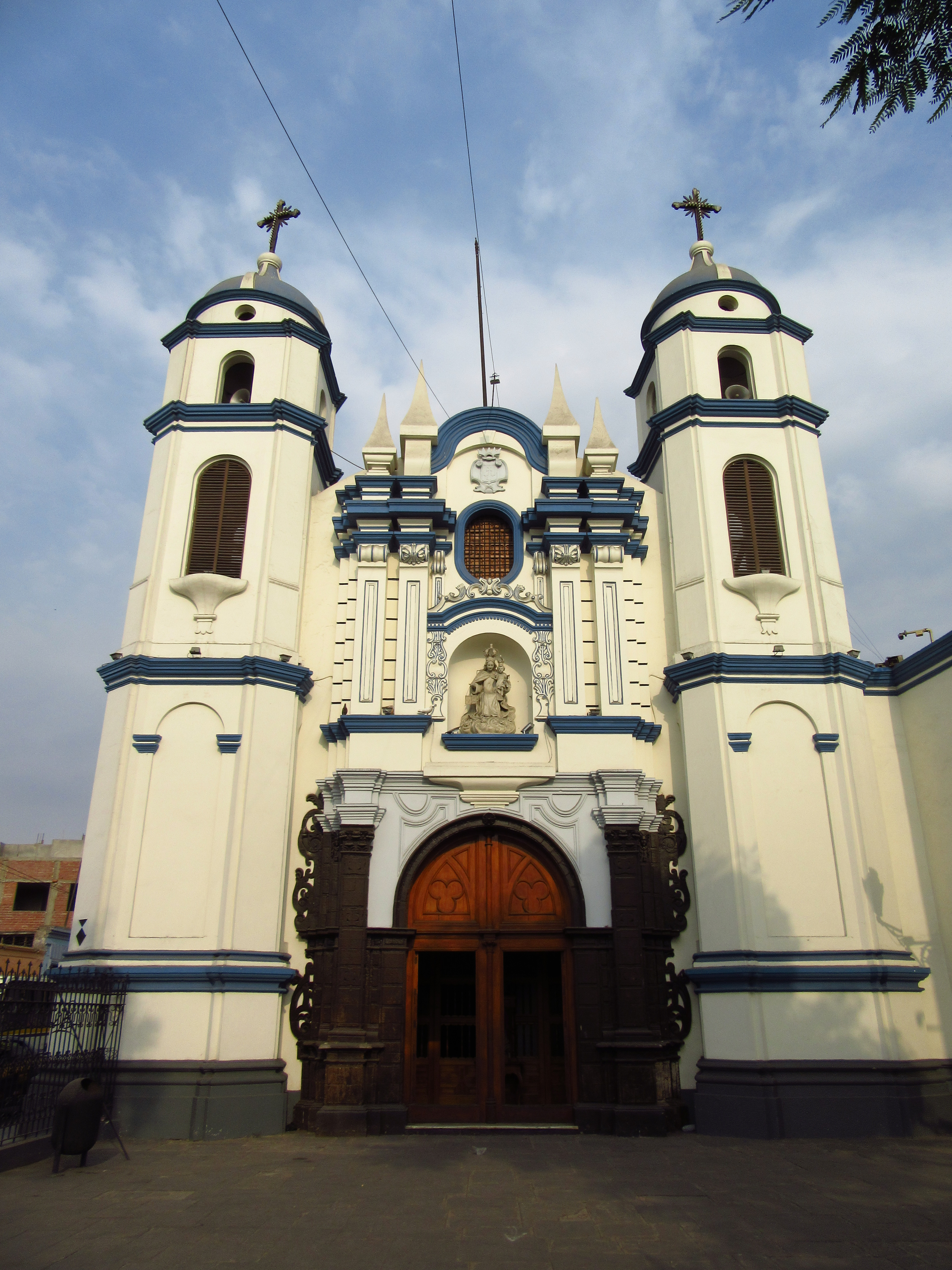
- The church in 2017

Religion
- Affiliation: Catholic
- Governing body: Archdiocese of Lima

Location
- Location: Barrios Altos, Lima
- Interactive map of Church and Monastery of Our Lady of Mount Carmel

Architecture
- Style: Rococo

The Church and Monastery of Our Lady of Mount Carmel (Spanish: Iglesia y Monasterio de Nuestra Señora del Carmen) is a Catholic church in the colonial area of the neighbourhood of Barrios Altos in Lima, Peru. Located in the corner of Huánuco and Junín streets, its first building dates back to the 17th century. Since then the structure has undergone multiple changes, many of them due to the earthquakes that have been recorded in the history of Lima. The current façade is in the Rococo style.

== History ==
At the beginning of the 17th century, a retreat for poor girls called Nuestra Señora del Carmen was founded in the place where the temple now occupies. In 1625 it became a monastery, and in 1643 the Monastery of the Carmelites or Nuestra Señora del Carmen Antiguo (or Alto) was inaugurated.

The earthquakes have caused serious damage. Those of 1687 and 1940 involved important changes in its plant.

== Overview ==
The first level of the cloister remains from the 1645 building. In its beginnings the temple had an Isabelline Gothic plan, but after the earthquake of 1687 it was modified to a Latin cross. This was characterized by its niche chapels and a short transept, as well as pilasters and corbels with railings on the walls to support the transverse arches of the half-barrel vaults with lunettes.

The church has two choirs on inside: one high and one low.

The Virgen del Carmen that is housed inside has received decorations such as Queen and Patroness of Creoleism, Mayor of Lima and custodian of the keys to the city, Medal of Honor from the Congress of Peru: Grand Cross Degree, among others.

The church can be visited from 9 to 11 in the morning, and from 4 to 5:30 in the afternoon. Masses are given from Monday to Saturday at 7 in the morning and on Sundays also at 10 in the morning and 7 at night.

Masses are also offered by the Virgen del Carmen Brotherhood, every second Sunday at 11 in the morning and masses by the children's brotherhood, every fourth Sunday, at the same time. In the month of July, masses are held in honor of the Virgin of Carmen. Pieces of religious art and sweets made by the Carmelite sisters can also be purchased.

== See also ==
- Barrios Altos
- Historic Centre of Lima
