= Casa Sal y Rosas =

Cultural heritage site in Peru

Coordinates: 12°03′38″S 77°02′21″W

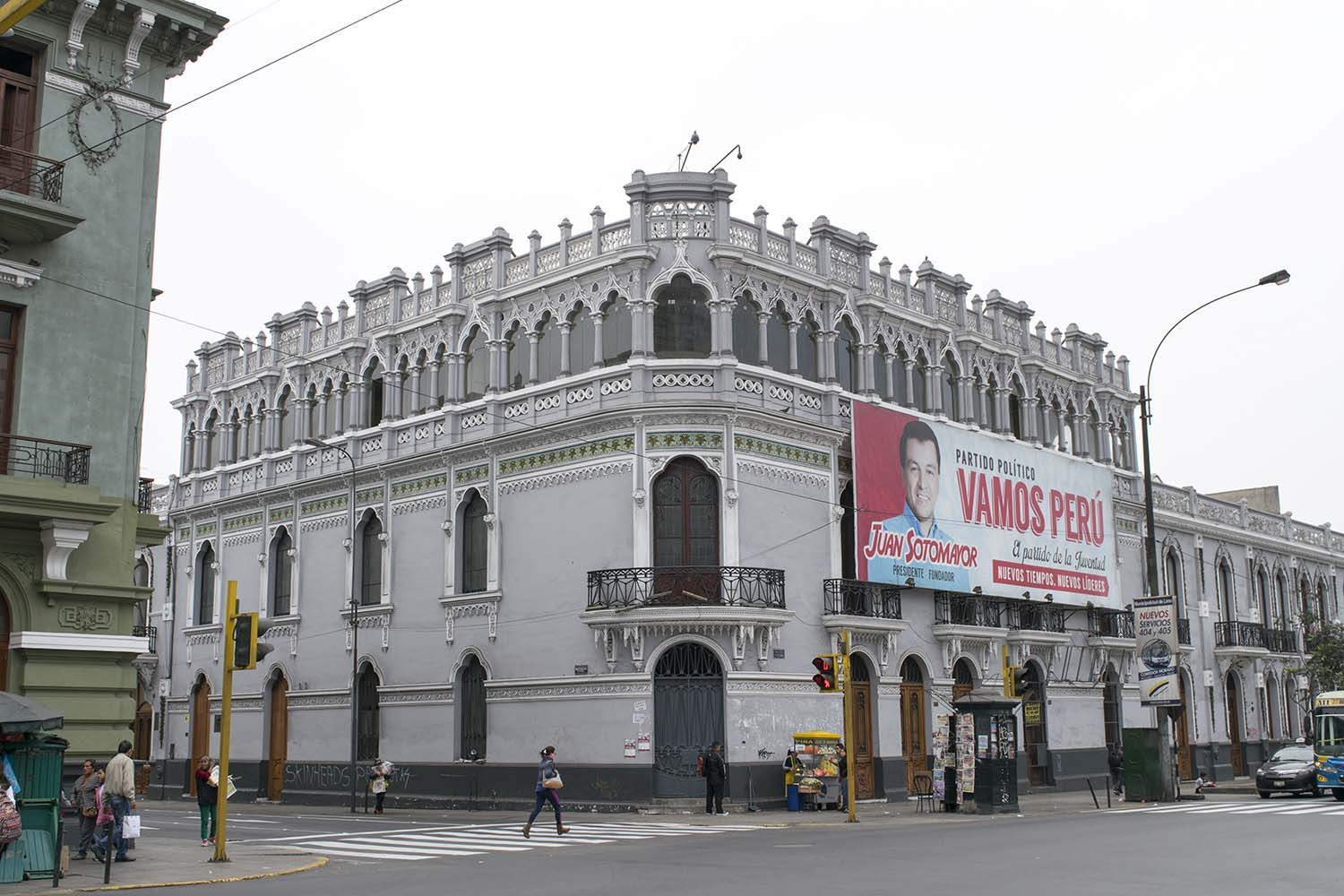
- Interactive map of the Casa Sal y Rosas area

General information
- Architectural style: Eclecticism
- Location: Lima District
- Inaugurated: 1917

Design and construction
- Architect: Víctor Mora

The Casa Sal y Rosas is a historic building in Lima District, Peru. It is located on the corner of the Paseo Colón and Jirón Washington.

== History ==
Designed in 1912 by Víctor Mora, it was inaugurated five years later. It owes its name to Francisco Sal y Rosas Valega, one of its owners, whose widow, Ignacia Rodulfo López Gallo, inherited the house. In this place the owner married General César Canevaro, Peruvian hero of the War of the Pacific.

== Overview ==
With a symmetrical distribution respectful of the academic style of the time, its design combines Art Nouveau details on its first two floors and is crowned with a third floor in the form of a completely open gallery in the Venetian neo-Gothic style. The interior continues to present modernist details, such as the design of the stained glass, windows, doors, and iron railings.

Its first floor has spaces for commerce. The main door, which faces the corner of Paseo Colón and Jirón Washington, precedes a small lobby with a large marble staircase that connects with the large hall on the second floor where the different rooms of the building are distributed. A lamppost designed with stained glass stands out, illuminating the space.

== See also ==
- Paseo Colón
