= Metropolitan Municipality of Lima =

Government agency in Peru

- Municipalidad Metropolitana de Lima

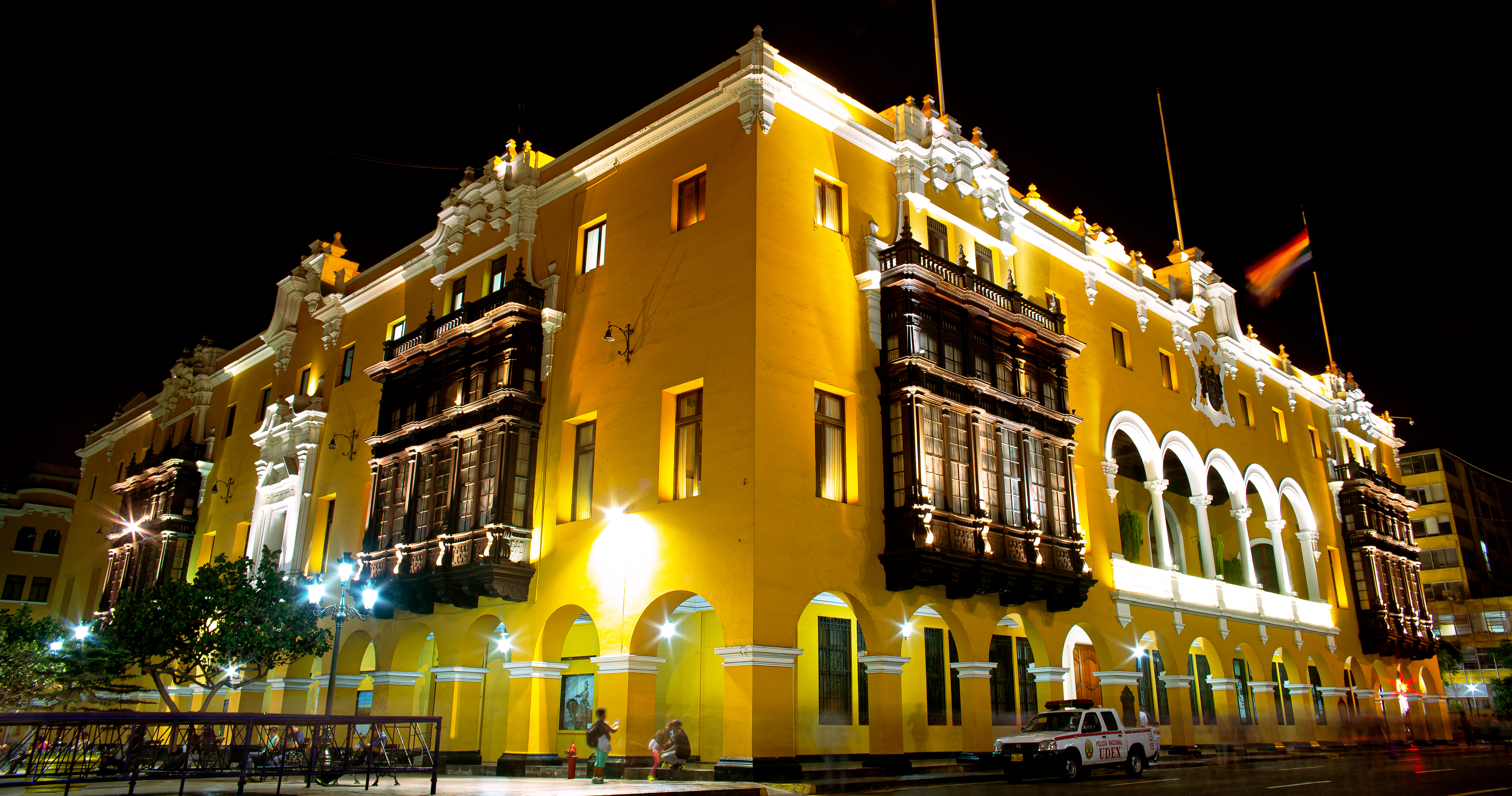
- Headquarters in Lima

Municipality overview
- Jurisdiction: Lima Province
- Headquarters: Jirón de la Unión 300
- Employees: 12,000+ (2022)
- Municipality executive: Mayor of Lima, Renzo Reggiardo
- Website: www.munlima.gob.pe

The Metropolitan Municipality of Lima (Spanish: Municipalidad Metropolitana de Lima; MML) is the top-tier administrative and governing body of Lima, the capital and largest city of Peru. Governing both Lima Province and Lima District, it is the only provincial municipality under a special regime equal in status to a regional government.

== History ==
It was established according to the 2002 Organic Law of Regional Governments (Ley Orgánica de Gobiernos Regionales) and the 2003 Organic Law of Municipalities (Ley Orgánica de Municipalidades).

== Organization ==
The organs of the Metropolitan Municipality of Lima are:

- the Council (El Concejo Metropolitano);
- the Mayor of Lima (La Alcaldía Metropolitana); and
- the Metropolitan Assembly (La Asamblea Metropolitana de Lima).

The Council consists of the Mayor and five aldermen, according to the Municipal Elections Law (Ley de Elecciones Municipales). The Metropolitan Assembly is an advisory and coordinating body.

== Function and powers ==
According to Article 154 of, the Metropolitan Municipality of Lima exerts jurisdiction, in matters within its competence, on the districts of Lima.
