= Basilica and Convent of Santo Domingo, Lima =

Basilica and convent in Lima, Peru

Basilica and Convent of Our Lady of the Rosary
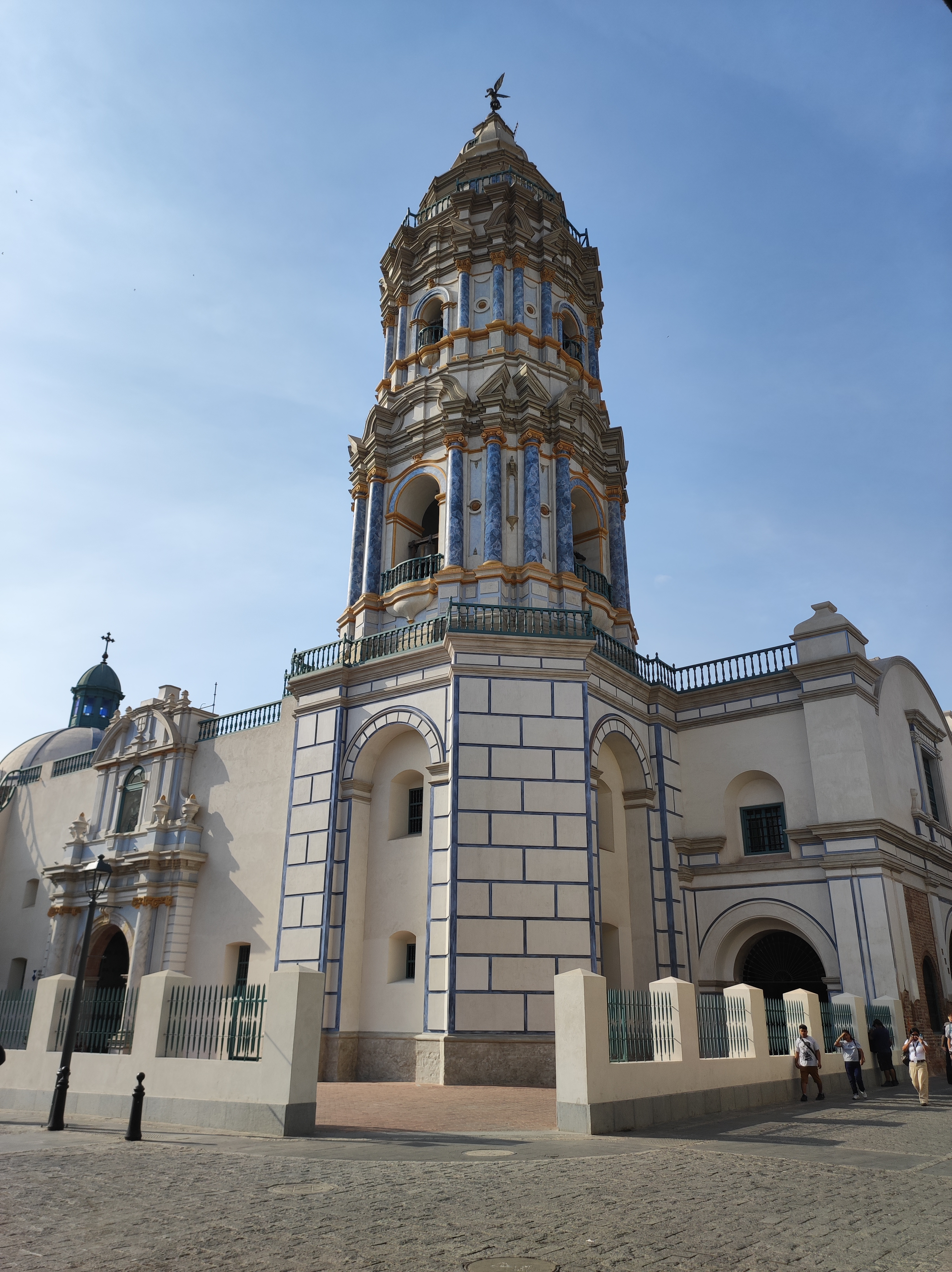
- Complete view of the basilica and convent
- Basilica and Convent of Our Lady of the Rosary
- 12.0440°S 77.0319°W
- Location: Historic Centre of Lima
- Country: Peru
- Denomination: Roman Catholic

History
- Founded: 1530s

Architecture
- Architect(s): Manuel de Amat y Junyent, Diego Maroto, Juan Martínez de Arrona, Miguel Güelles and Juan de Uceda
- Style: Rococo and Mudéjar
- Completed: 1766

The Basilica and Convent of Our Lady of the Rosary (Spanish: Basílica Menor y Convento Máximo de Nuestra Señora del Rosario), commonly known as the Convent of Santo Domingo (or Convent of the Holy Rosary), is a Catholic religious complex located in the city of Lima, Peru.

It was created in the 1530s under the patronage of Our Lady of the Rosary and is located in the Historic Centre of Lima. It houses the relics of Rose of Lima and Martin de Porres, and was also where the University of San Marcos, officially the first Peruvian university and the oldest university in the Americas, began to function in the 16th century.

== History ==
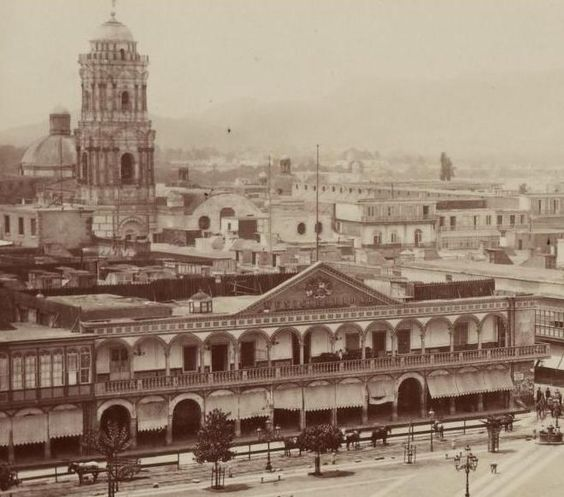
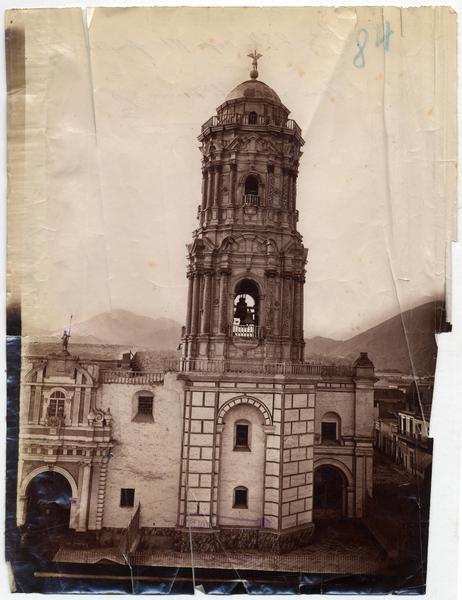
Views of the bell tower in 1874 (left) and 1902 (right).

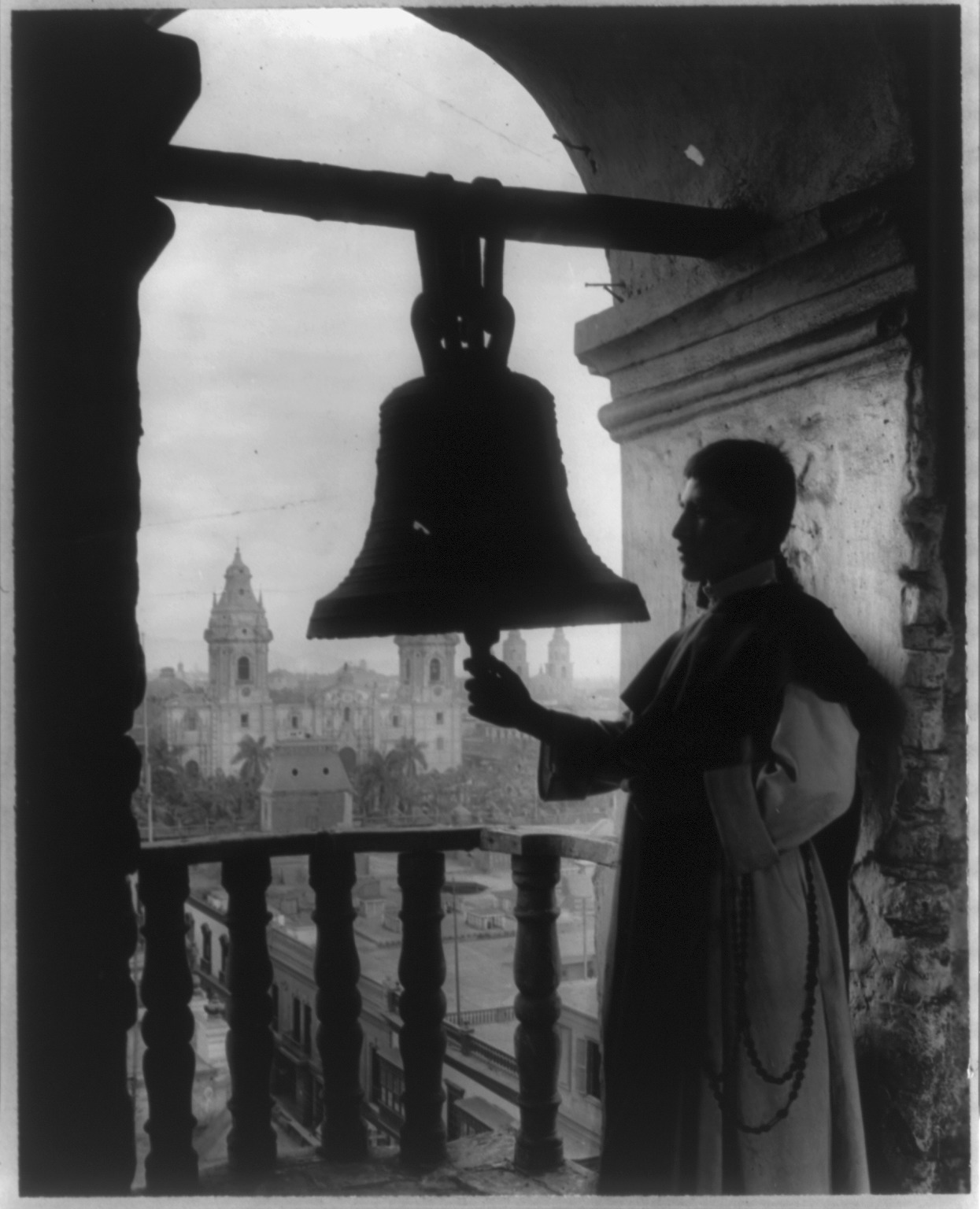
Monk holding clapper of bell in the belfry of the Basilica of Santo Domingo, circa 1923

The construction of the Convent of Santo Domingo took about 50 years. Its construction began during the foundation of Lima and concluded at the end of the 16th century. It was the provincial Friar Tomás de San Martín who began to carry out the construction of the first church of the Order, and later the superior Friar Sebastián de Ayllón received aid from the King, finishing the work in the year 1578.

The first building was destroyed by the earthquake of 1678. A new church was erected by Dominican architect Diego Maroto, and the convent was rebuilt; it had six cloisters and several courtyards before the earthquake of 1687. The church was rebuilt from the transept to the choir; the arches were changed, and the number of windows was expanded. As a result, the church acquired breadth, simplicity and uniformity. The materials used in the construction were adobe, brick and calicanto, among others. The quincha served to lighten the weight, to make the structure more flexible and to increase the resistance to the earthquakes, so frequent in this region.

Because the earthquakes of 1687 and 1746 necessitated further modifications, such as the reconstruction of the tower, the main portal of the church, and part of the convent, which included changes in the distribution of the cloisters, which can currently be appreciated.

The church was elevated to the category of Minor Basilica in 1930. The structure of the church was somewhat damaged ten years later by an earthquake and restored in later years. The convent's apple orchard would be lost to the changing course of the Rímac River.

== The church ==
=== Exterior ===
The exterior of the church was originally covered by bossage, as can still be seen at the base of the bell tower. A primitive portal, two bodies and three streets, was carved in the second half of the 17th century. In later years, a new portal would rise because of the earthquakes that destroyed the church.

The church was restored after the Earthquake of Lima and Callao of 1940, which involved the application of cement in the walls.

==== Bell tower ====
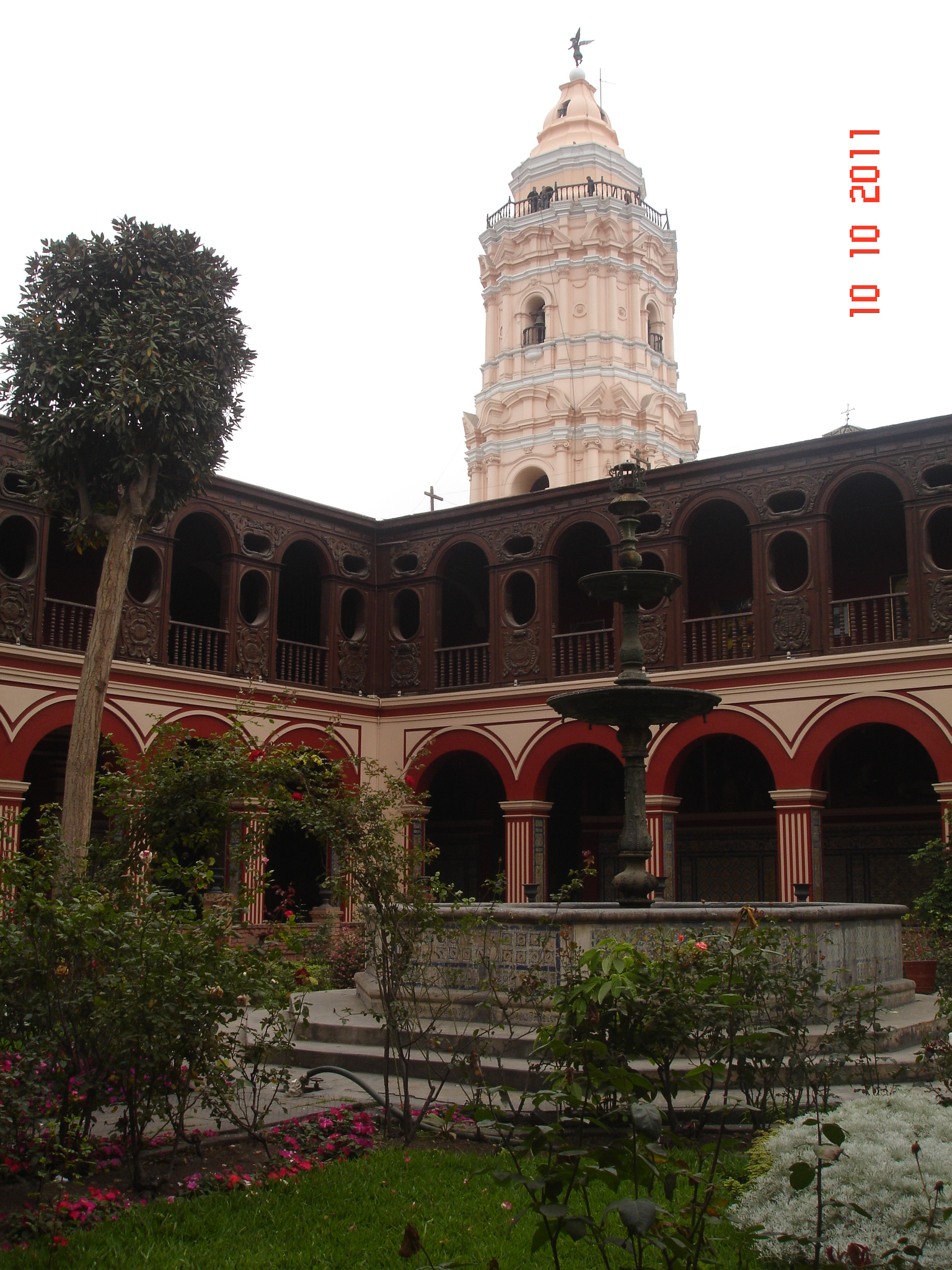
Cloister and bell tower

The first bell tower of the church, of Baroque style and three bodies, was designed together with the church by Diego Maroto in the second half of the 17th century and was destroyed during the earthquake of 28 October 1746.

The present bell tower was conceived and designed by the Viceroy Manuel d'Amat i de Junyent in 1766 in the Rococo style, with an octagonal base. It is divided into a lower body and two tall bodies with small balconies on corbels. At the top is the sculpture of a figure holding a trumpet, representing the angel who announces the Final Judgment. The total height is 46 meters and is considered one of the most characteristic elements of the religious complex. The base of the bell tower still preserves the bossage that once covered the facade of the first church.

The total height is 46 meters. Its original color is white and pink, making it the most characteristic and striking element of the religious set.

=== Description of its interior ===
Historic Center of Lima
UNESCO World Heritage Site
- Interactive map of Historic Center of Lima
- Criteria: Cultural: iv
- Reference: 500
- Inscription: 1988 (12th Session)
- Area: 259.36 ha (640.9 acres)
- Buffer zone: 766.70 ha (1,894.6 acres)

The church is divided into a main nave covered by rib vaulting and two lateral naves with interconnected and lantern chapels, in which are also the lateral portal of the church, the access to the tower, and, next to the epistle, an entrance to the main cloister of the convent. The main nave has an additional entrance to the feet, preceded by the narthex (space where religious instruction was given to the natives or those who were not baptized), on which is the high choir of the church.

==== Choir ====
The choir of the church is considered the oldest ashlar masonry in the country. Completely worked in cedar wood brought from Nicaragua, it is of Renaissance style, with Mannerist elements.

It has two sets of stalls: the first level was modernly sculpted, with the design based on the old. The originals are in the back, bearing carvings of saints and other biblical characters. In the central part of the ashlar is the main seat of the prior of the convent, with carvings of Saint Dominic and Saint Francis of Assisi, founders of the Dominicans and the Franciscans, respectively. The seat of the choir was carved by several artists, among whom Juan Martínez de Arrona (1562 -1635) was outstanding.

==== Nave ====
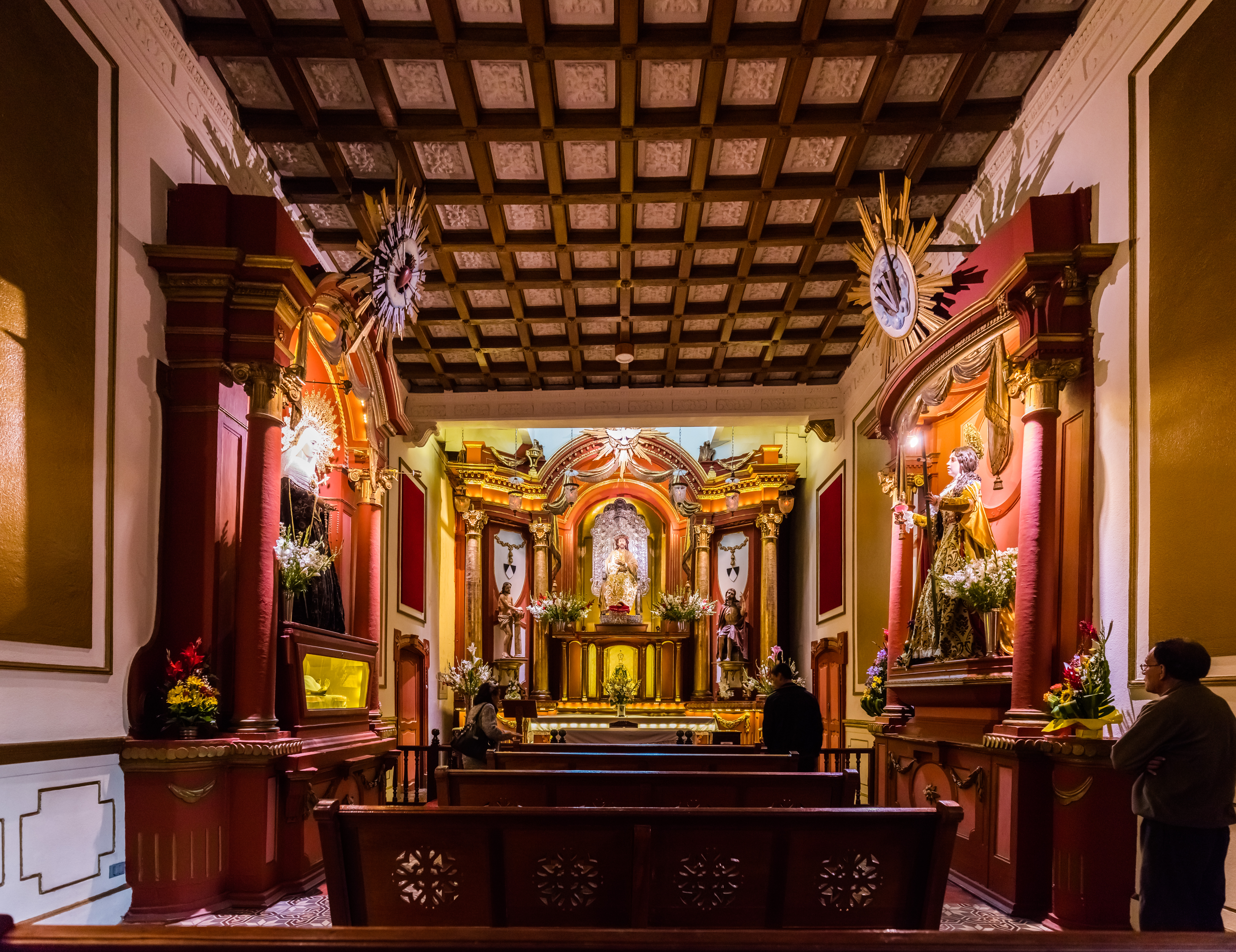
Chapel

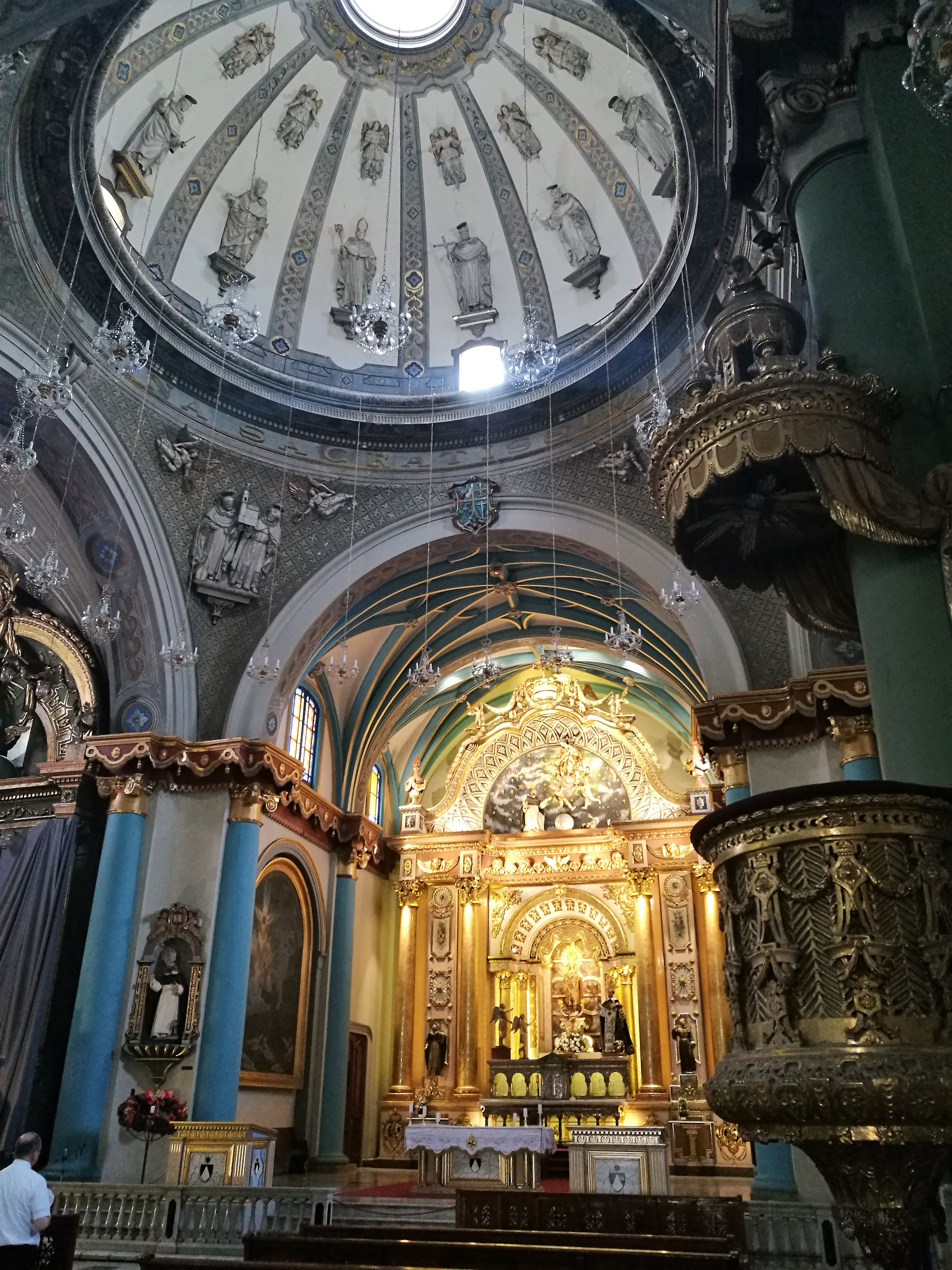
Altarpiece and apse

As mentioned previously, the enclosure is formed by three naves, of which the lateral ones are composed of chapels in which several reredos are located. On the side portal from left to right, we find the following reredos or altarpieces: Next to the Gospel, the altarpieces of St. Hyacinth of Poland, Saint Joseph, Saint Dominic and Our Lady of the Rosary; and on the side of the Epistle, those of the Peruvian Saints, the Souls, St. Thomas Aquinas, Sacred Heart, Chapel of the Lord of Justice and the Chapel of the Co-fraternity of the Rosary.

The most important is the altarpiece of the Peruvian Saints, of neoclassical style, located in the right transept of the church. In the center is the effigy of St. Rose of Lima, to the left is that of St. Martin de Porres and to the right is that of St. John Macias, who, in spite of being born in the Iberian Peninsula, is considered Peruvian because he developed his religious life in Lima. At the bottom of these images are reliquaries where the remains of each saint mentioned above rest. In the lower part of the altar there is a sculpture of St. Rose of Lima, made by the Maltese artist Melchor Caffá in 1669, on behalf of the Pope Clement IX to give it to the Dominican fathers for his beatification.

In the left transept is the altarpiece dedicated to the Patroness of Lima and titular of the church, Our Lady of the Rosary. In neoclassical style, it conserves in its main niche the effigy of this invocation "que fue la primera de este Reyno" (that she was the first one of this Kingdom). According to tradition, it was given to Lima by King Charles V, Holy Roman Emperor. It was specially venerated by Rose of Lima and Martin de Porres, among others, and was crowned solemnly in the year 1927.

==== Presbytery ====
The altar is of neoclassical style with decoration in turquoise and gold.

== The Convent ==
=== Chapter house ===
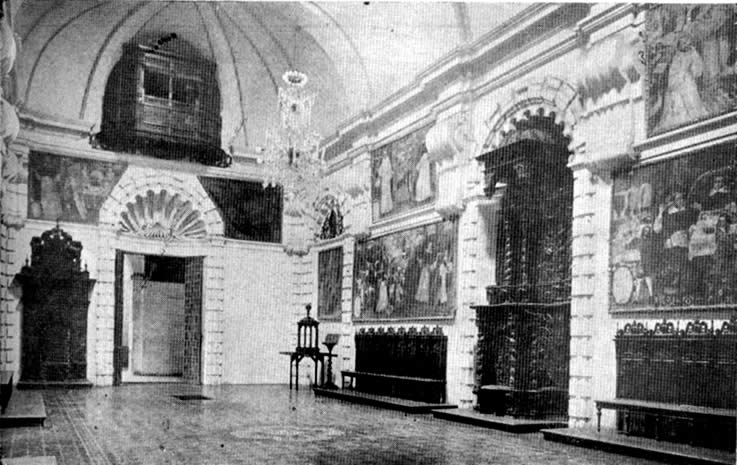
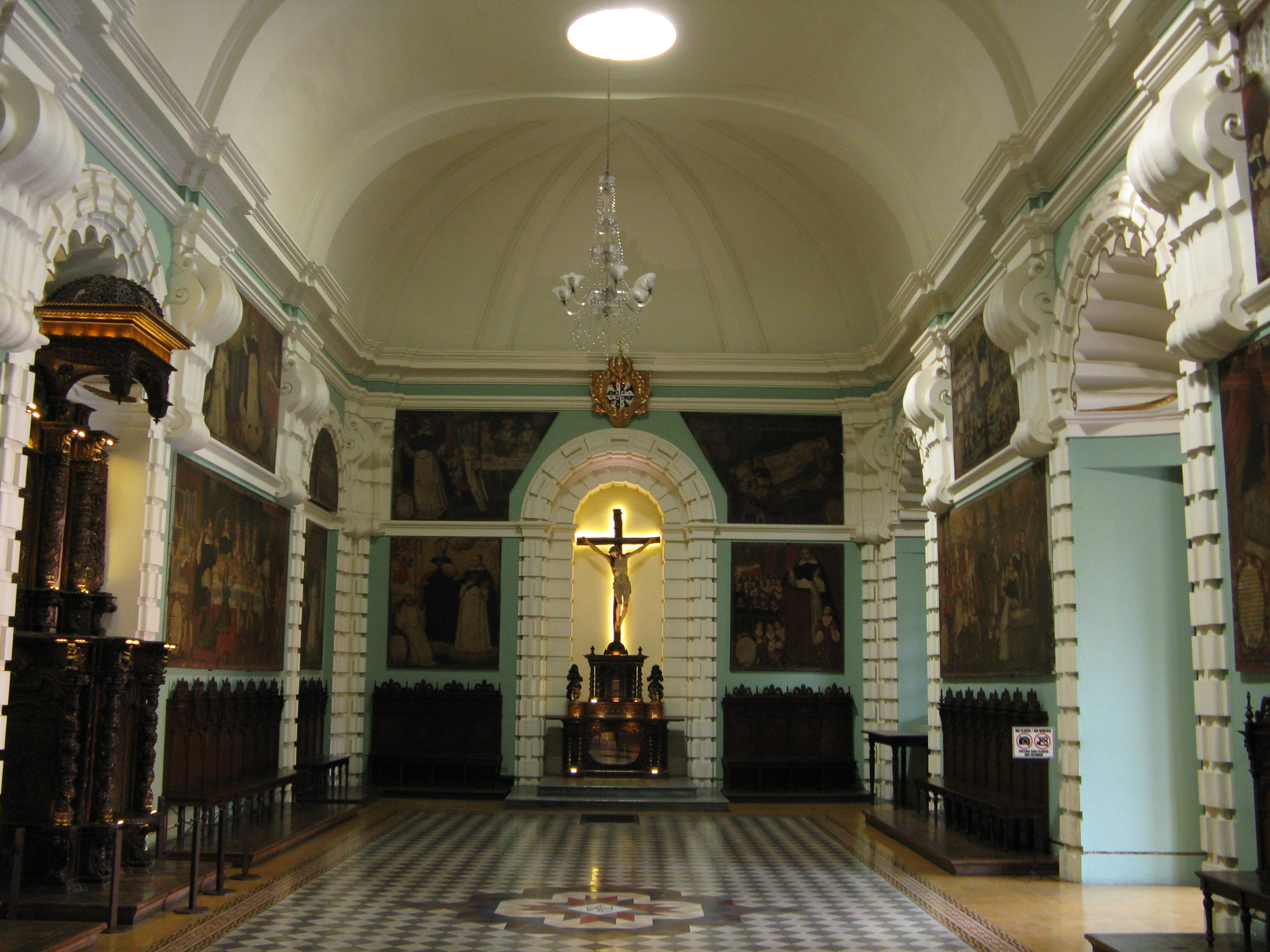
The chapter house in the 1920s and in the present.

It is called the Chapter House because all the friars were gathered in chapters in order to choose their authorities and solve their problems. The room was made in the 17th century, in Baroque style, by the Friar Diego Maroto, a member of the Order, an architect born in Camarena (current province of Toledo, Spain). In 1551, in this same stage, the University of San Marcos was inaugurated. Its existing tribune, or chatedra, was used in the 17th century to dictate classes or support theses; it was made in the baroque style, has Solomonic columns, and presents a painting of St. Thomas Aquinas, to the front is a small reredos where the Christ of the agony is venerated, before which Martin de Porres was ecstatic and embraced the one to whom it was seen.

=== Guest room ===
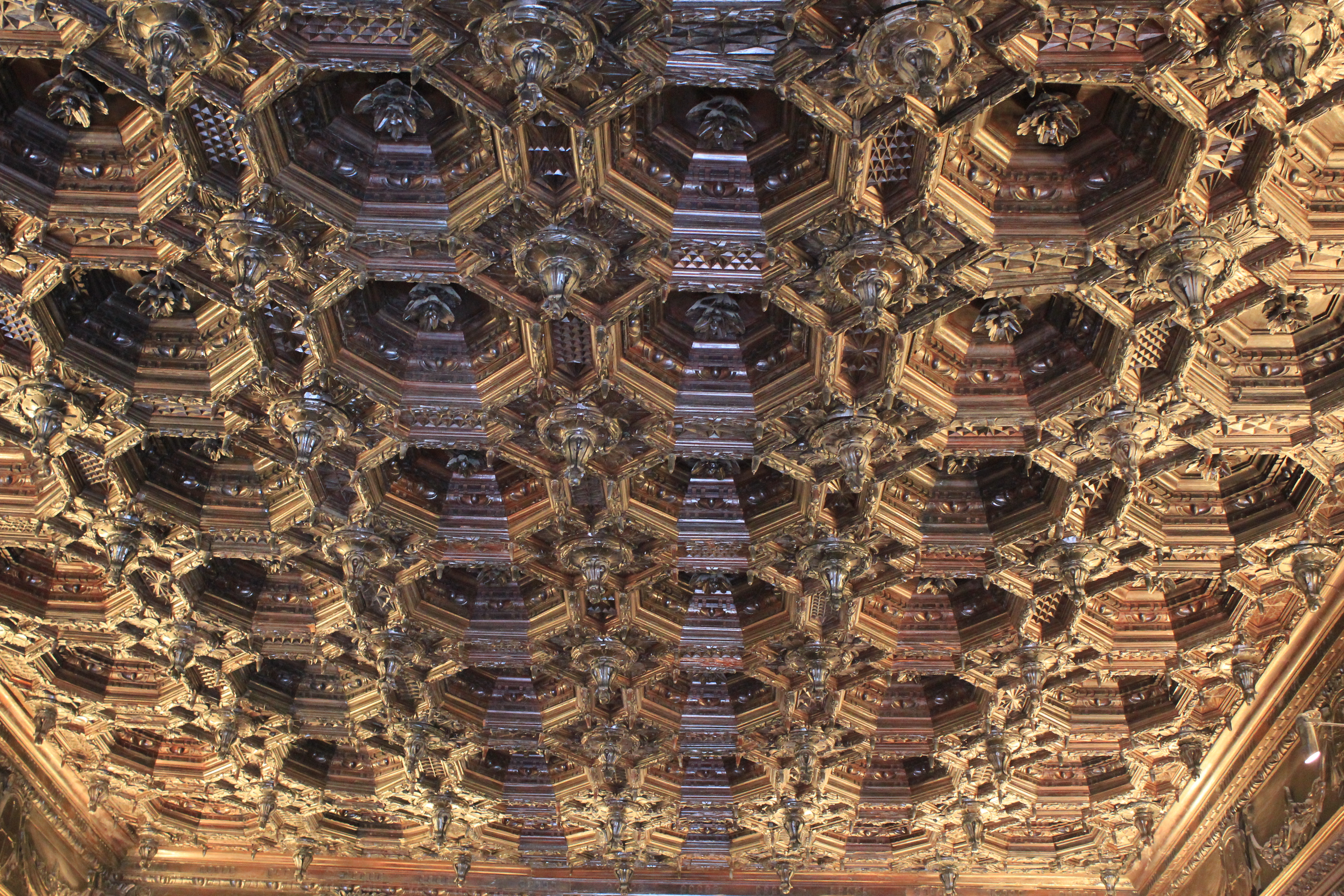
Artesonado dated to 1580 in the guest room

Here, the fathers receive their authorities and relatives. The most noteworthy feature of this room is its artesonado ceiling dated to 1580, made of three thousand pieces held together by pressure without the use of nails. In this place, the notes of the National Anthem of Peru were composed by José Bernardo Alcedo.

=== Main cloister ===
Composed of four galleries, decorated with Sevillian azulejos dating from 1604 and 1606; the paintings that present passages of the life of Saint Dominic, founder of the Dominican order, were contracted in 1608 by the provincial superior of the Order of Saint Dominic in Peru with the Sevillians Miguel Güelles, disciple of Juan de Uceda and his collaborator, Domingo Carro. At every corner of this cloister there is a reredos with biblical representations. These galleries have artesonado ceilings carved of oak from Panama; the cloister also features a bronze home stoup, ordered to be built by the Dominicans, very famous for being where St. Martin de Porres, according to the writer Ricardo Palma, washed the bread of blond sugar, turning it white.

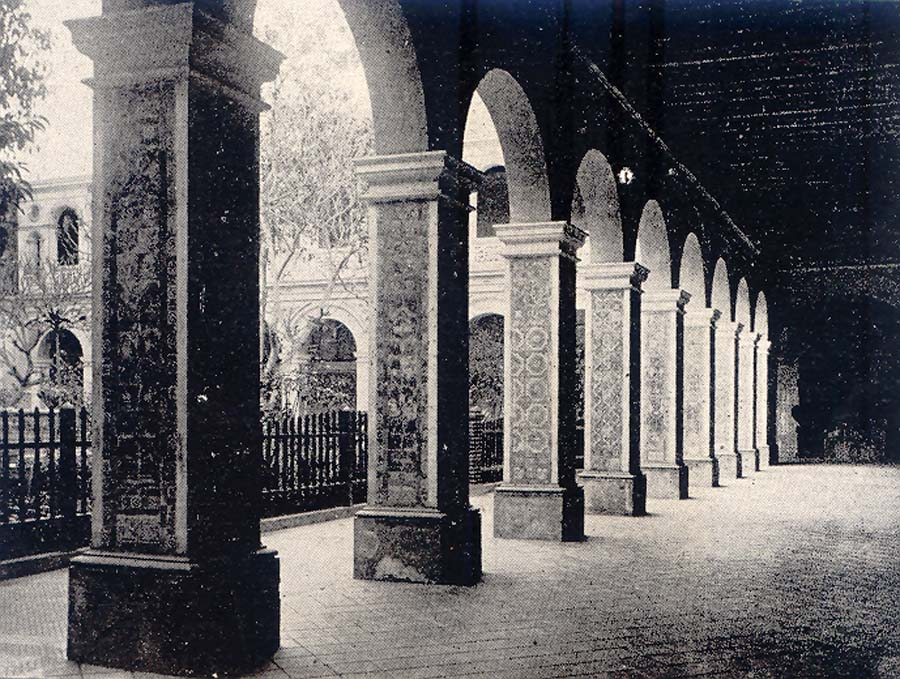
The Sevillian azulejos of the cloister dated to 1606. Photo from 1900

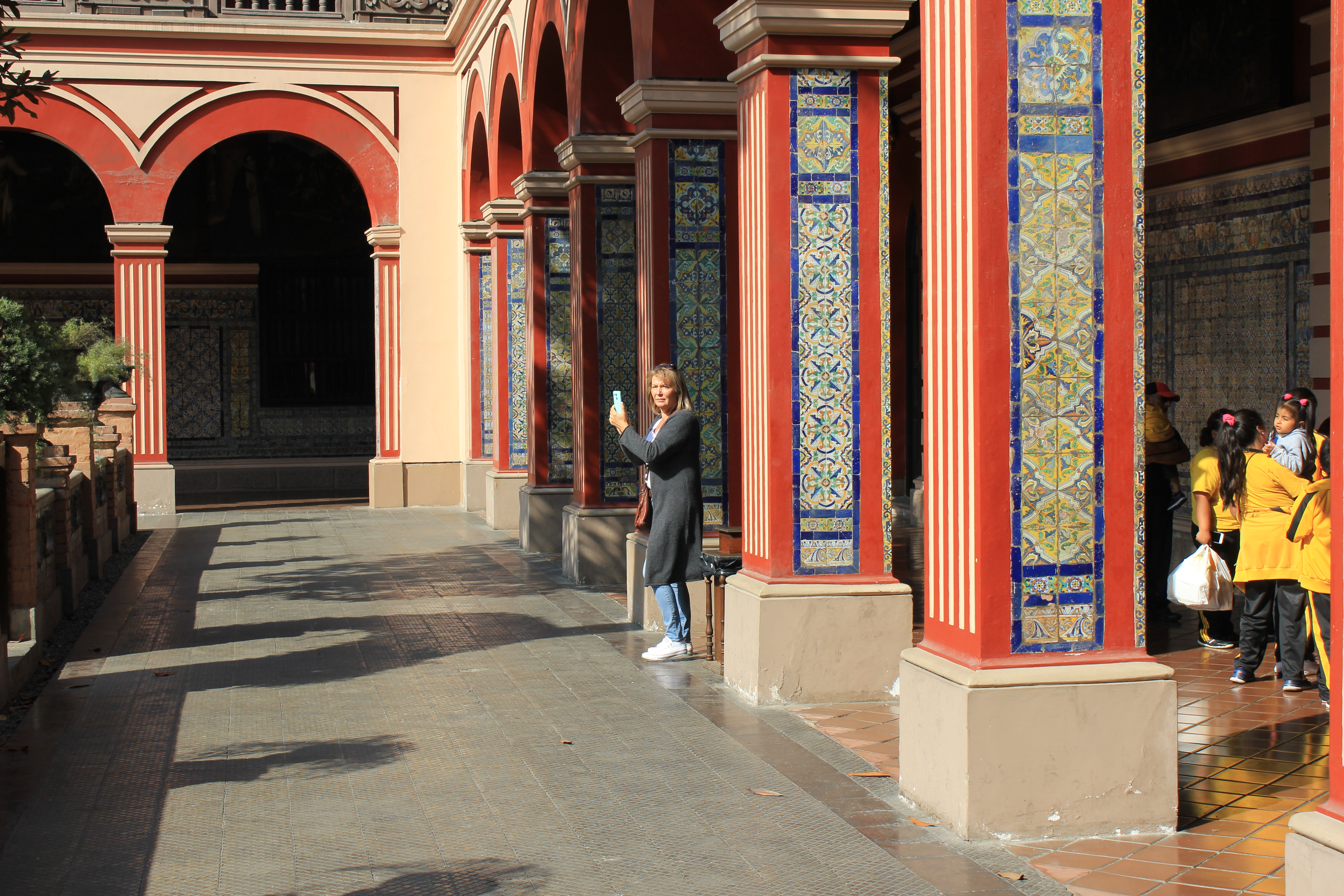
The Sevillian azulejos dated to 1606 in the cloister

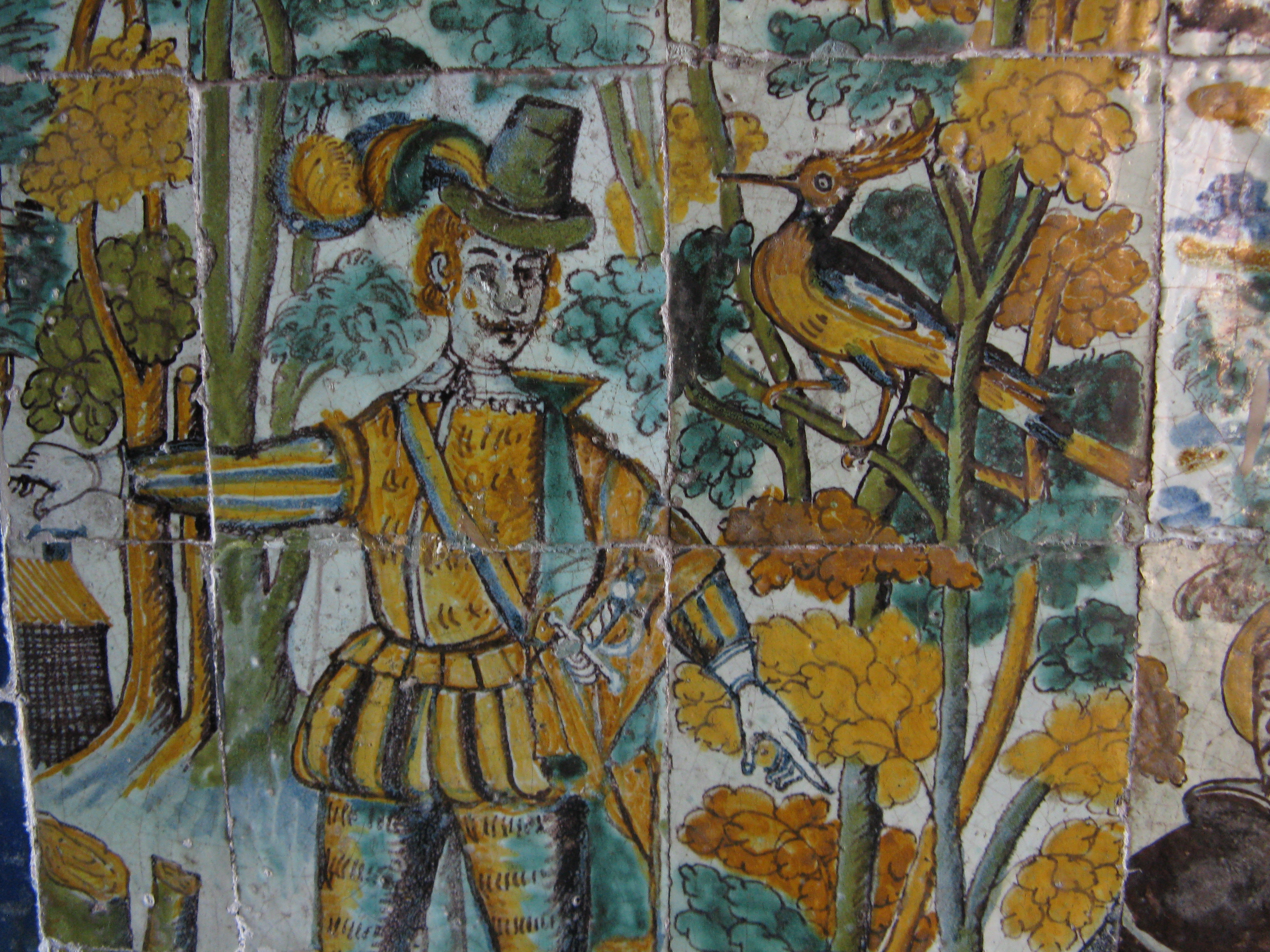
Detail of Sevillian azulejos dated to 1606 inside the church

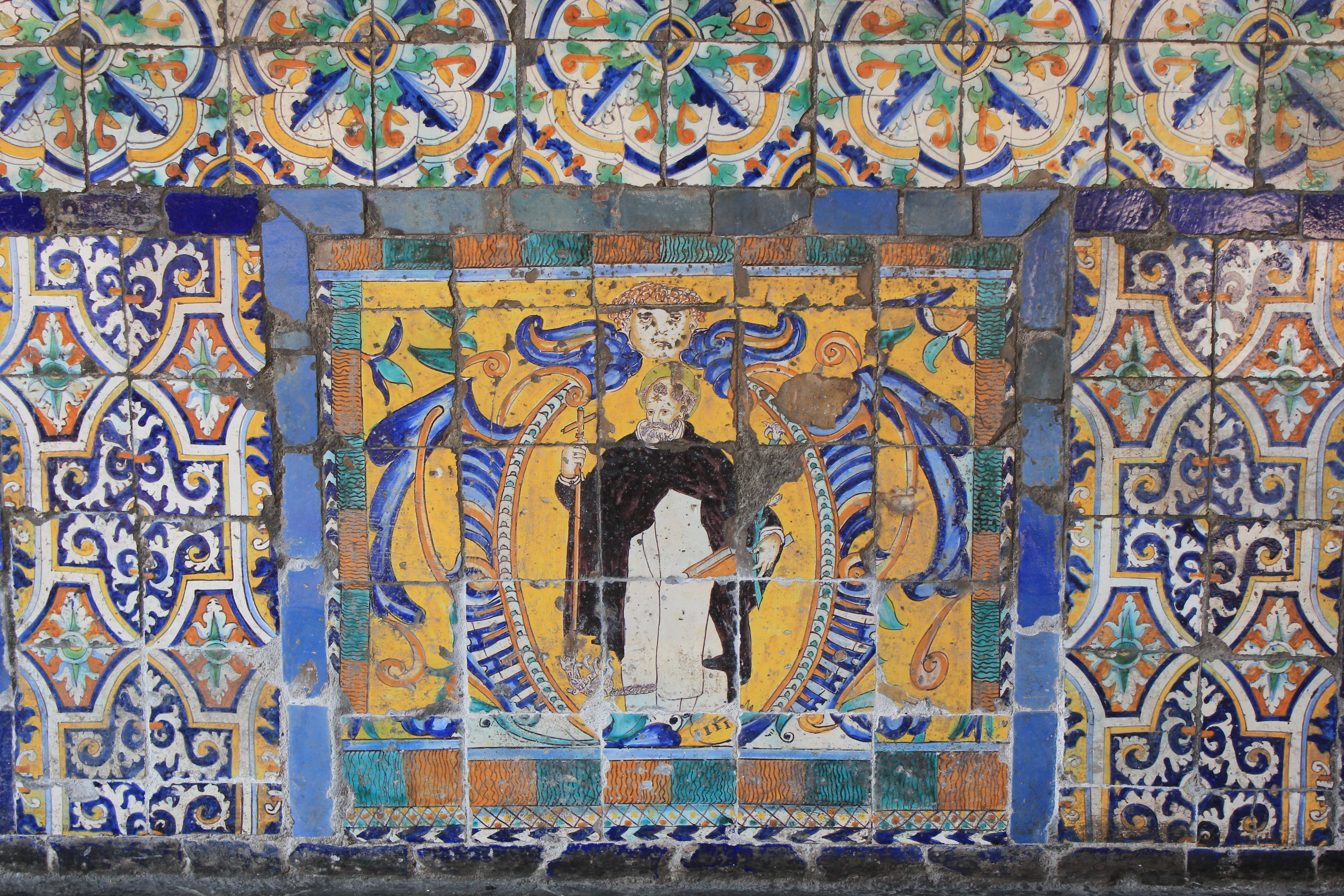
Detail of Sevillian azulejos dated to 1606 inside the church

=== Library ===
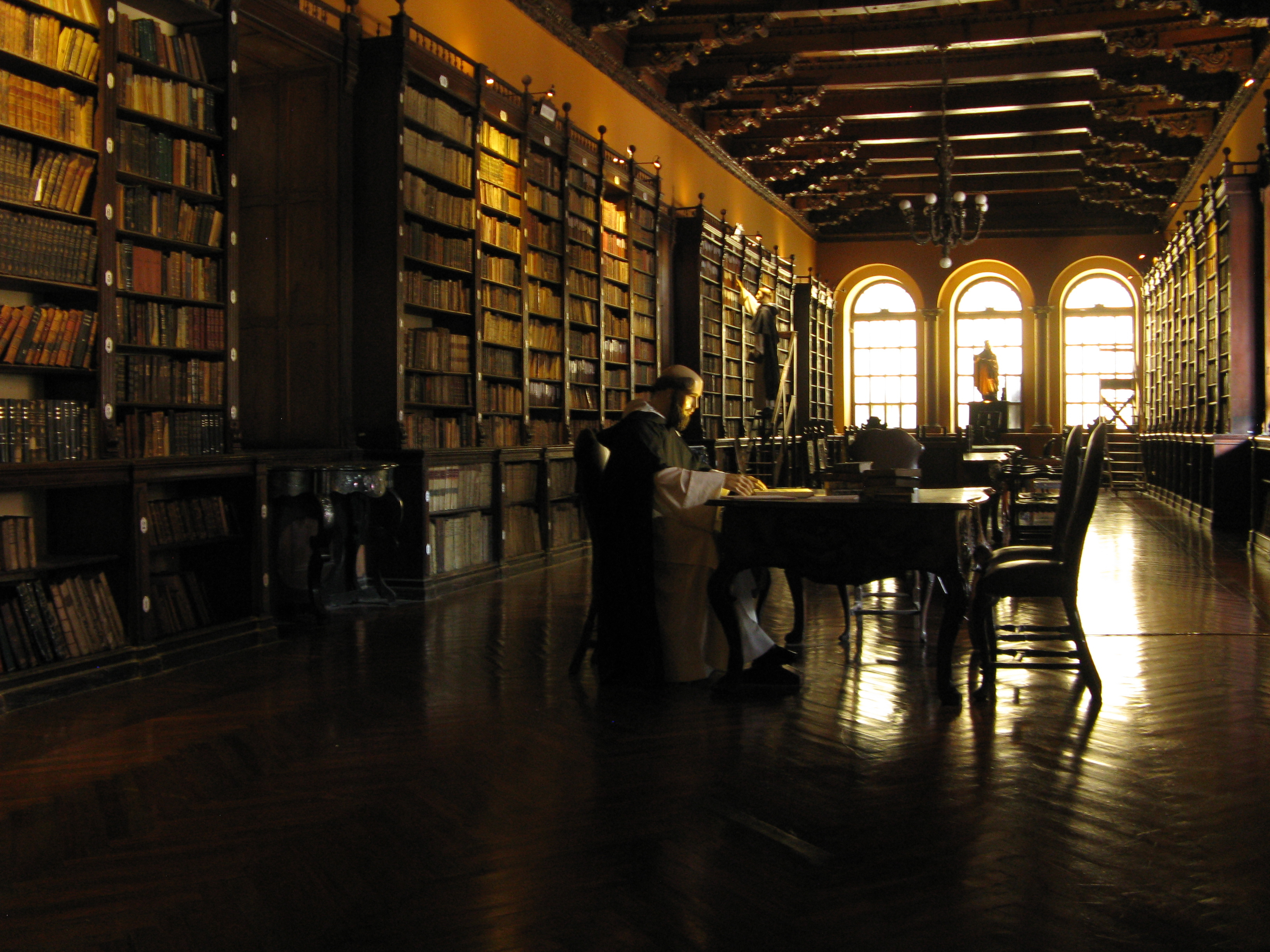
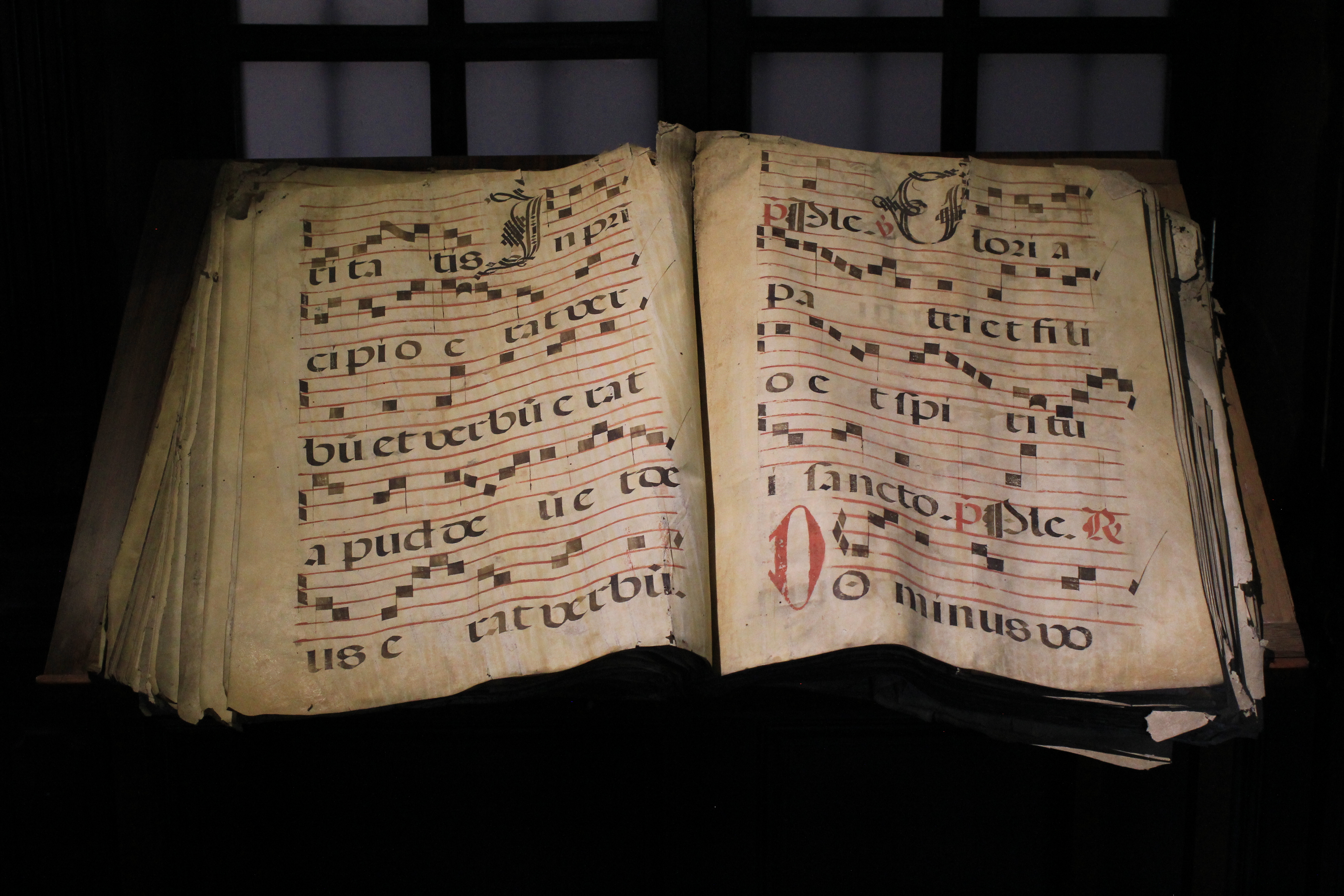
The important library and one of its incunable books.

One of the most worthy places to visit is the library, not only for the value of the written works, but also for the coffered ceilings. This hall houses the oldest books that the Dominicans used, including incunables. The Library of the Convent has around 25,000 books, among them several bibliographical collections of great value.

Currently, it is in the space of the old dining room.

=== Second cloister ===
Of simpler construction, in a corner you can see a sculpture in marble from Carrara (Italy) that represents the Christ of the Column. The cloister is composed of two floors; the first one presents arches with bossages, and the second floor with balusters of trilobulated arcs.

=== Chapel of St. Martin de Porres ===
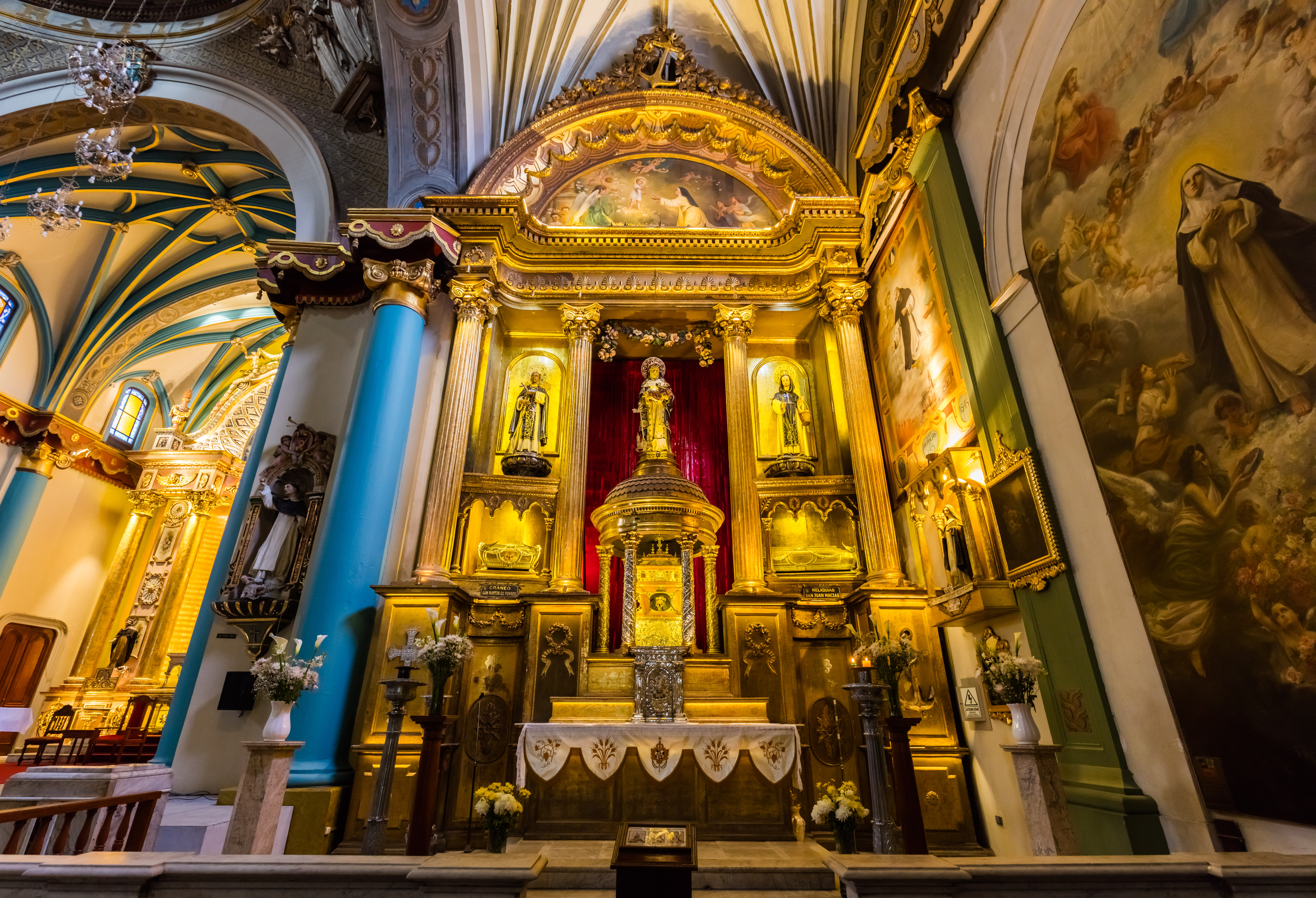
Lateral nave where the remains of St. Rose of Lima, St. Martin de Porres and St. John Macias rest.

This chapel is the place where St. Martin de Porres had his cell destroyed by the earthquake of 1746. Due to the faith and donations of the Church, a chapel was built in the place where he also had his nursery. It has an altar where his effigy is venerated, with to its sides Saint Dominic and St. Francis of Assisi and, in the upper part, the Virgin of the Rosary. In the burial rest his remains and an urn where the timbers of his bed are conserved. On the walls, you can see paintings depicting Martin de Porres's miracles. At the back of the chapel is his bedroom. It also emphasizes the Oratory of the saint, a small area under the stairs where Martin frequently prayed and was tempted by the devil. Today you can see the great number of gifts brought to him by his faithful devotees. At the top is a wooden cross, which reminds us that in this same place St. Martin resisted the temptations of the evil one.

=== Tomb of Santa Rosa de Lima ===
Located in the place that was an old cemetery where the first religious of the order were buried. An ossuary several meters deep where the bones of the time were placed. The tomb of marble where the remains of St. Rose of Lima are buried is in the center of the environment, which is decorated with mosaics. On a memorial plaque, it reads: "Hago donación de mi cuerpo a mis hermanos dominicos" (I donate my body to my Dominican brothers). This phrase expresses gratitude for having belonged to the Tertiary Dominican Order.

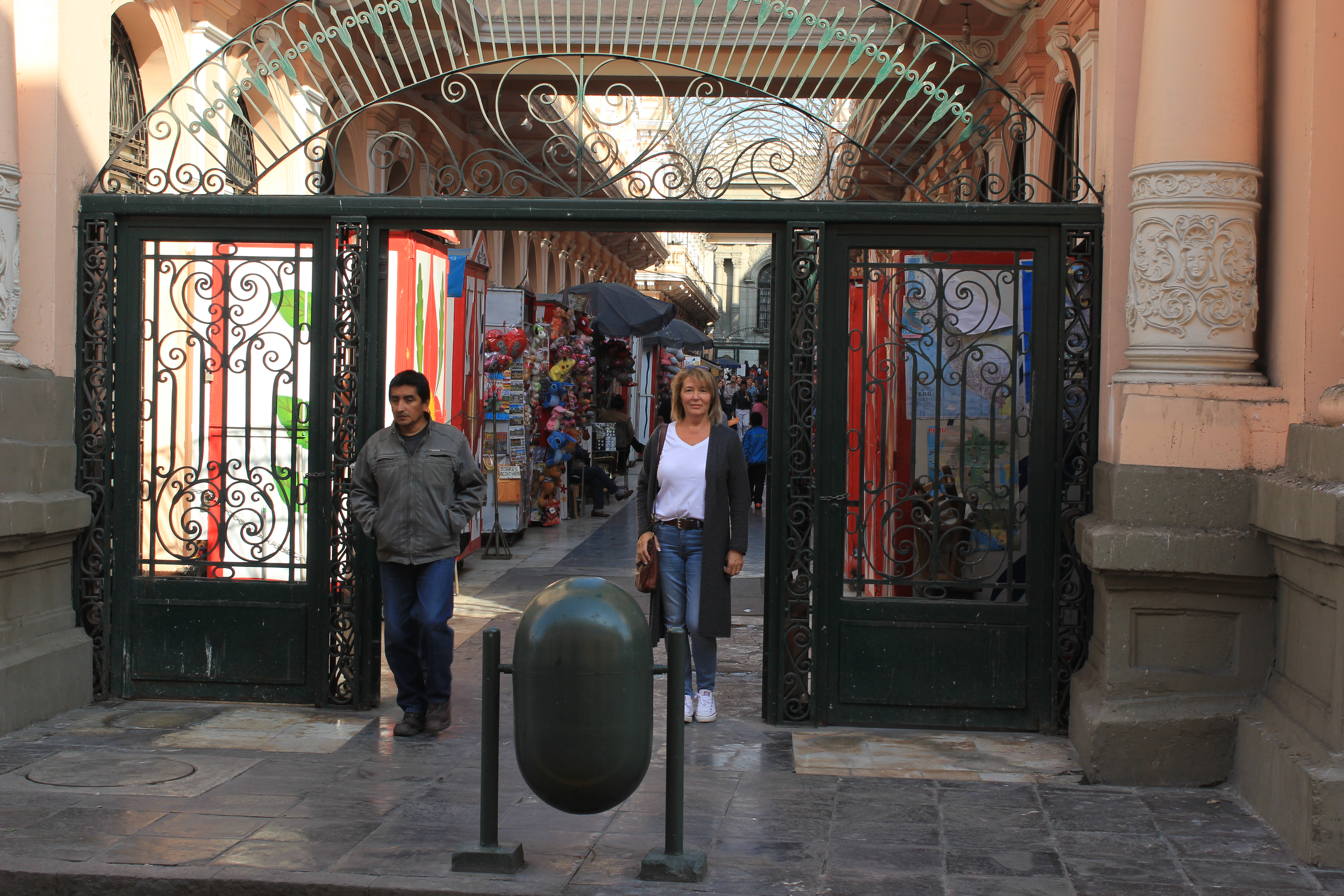
View at the entrance of the basilica

== Colegio de Santo Tomás de Aquino ==
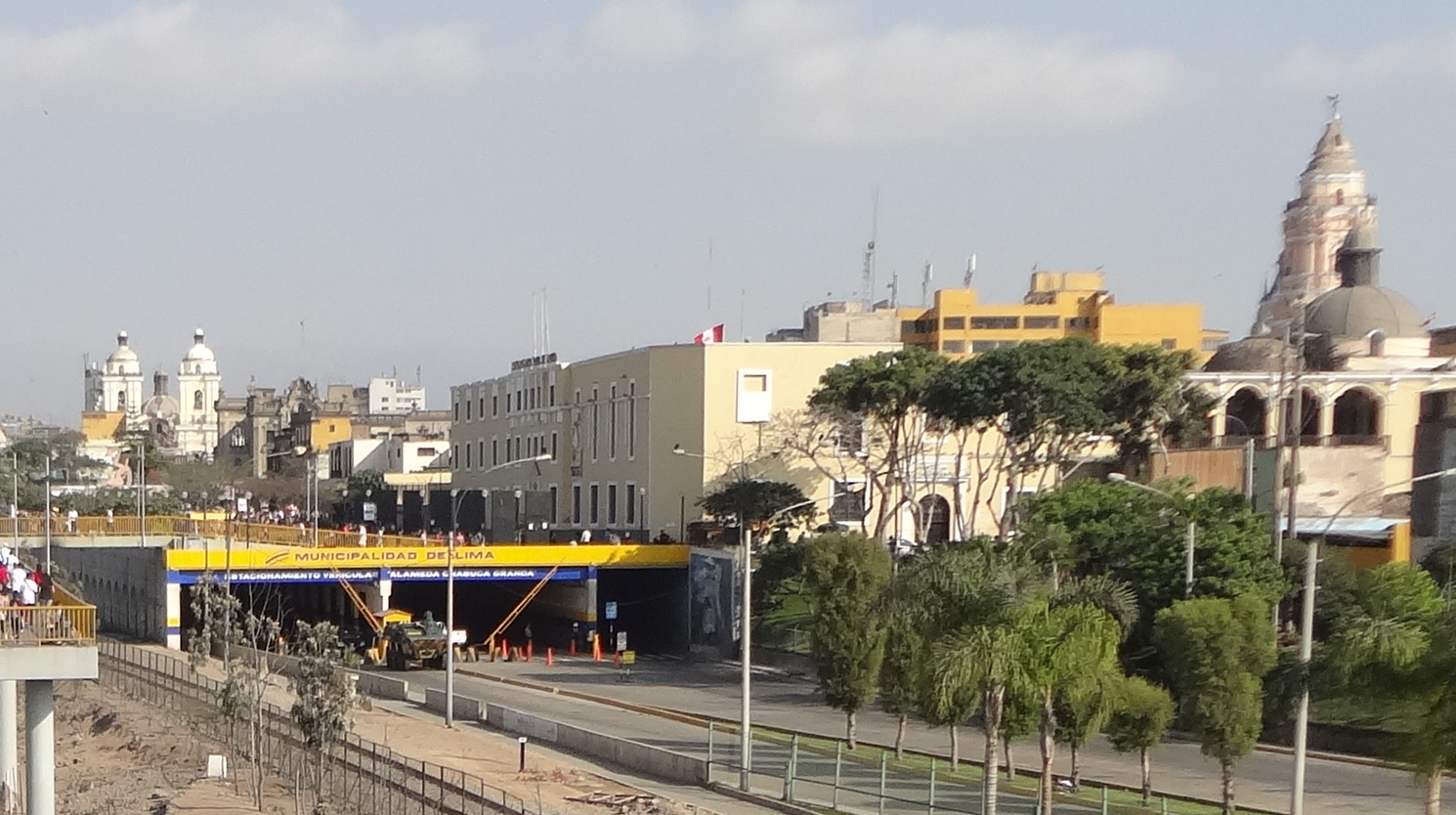
The Colegio Santo Tomás de Aquino in 2016.

The Dominican Order inaugurated the Colegio Santo Tomás de Aquino (College of St. Thomas Aquinas) in 1892, next to the convent of Santo Domingo, in the center of Lima. The college retains its original location at Pasaje Rinconada de Santo Domingo 209, and still has direct access from its main courtyard to the convent. This was the first and only educational center in Lima to be founded by the Dominican fathers. Its first director was Jordán Revilla O.P.

In the Jirón Camaná, the street parallel to the Pasaje Rinconada de Santo Domingo, are located the facilities of the Post Office of Lima and the Iglesia Santo Domingo; in turn, in the Jirón Conde de Superunda, behind the college, is what was the Post and Telegraphs Office of Lima, now the Museum of Gastronomy.

The cloisters of the Convento de Santo Domingo, which are separated from the college only by a door, have a close relationship with the history of education in Peru. It was founded in 1535 along with the city of Lima. There were the first classes of what is now the National University of San Marcos (UNMSM), also known as the Dean of the Americas. The frontis of Santo Tomás de Aquino has been a mute witness to changes in the city. Several decades ago, there was a parking lot in front of the school, but later, the frontis was invaded by merchants who would form in that place the commercial center Polvos Azules.

In 1997, during the management of the defunct Alberto Andrade, this center was relocated, and the space became the Alameda Chabuca Granda. Another recent change in the infrastructure surrounding the college was the construction of the Rayitos de Sol Bridge, during the management of former mayor Luis Castañeda Lossio. This bridge connects the Chabuca Granda mall to the Santa Rosa area on the Vía de Evitamiento road.

Today, a track is being built underneath the Rímac River, located opposite the college, which is part of the Vía Parque Rímac.

But the Colegio Santo Tomás de Aquino has also changed over time; in the beginning, the college was only for men for more than 100 years; only from the year 1994 were women admitted, becoming a mixed educational center.

In addition, since 2010, Inés Rossi Rossi has been the director of the college, a fact that, for Aquinense College, is a milestone in its history, since its creation it has always had only directors belonging to the Dominican Order.

== The Plazuela ==
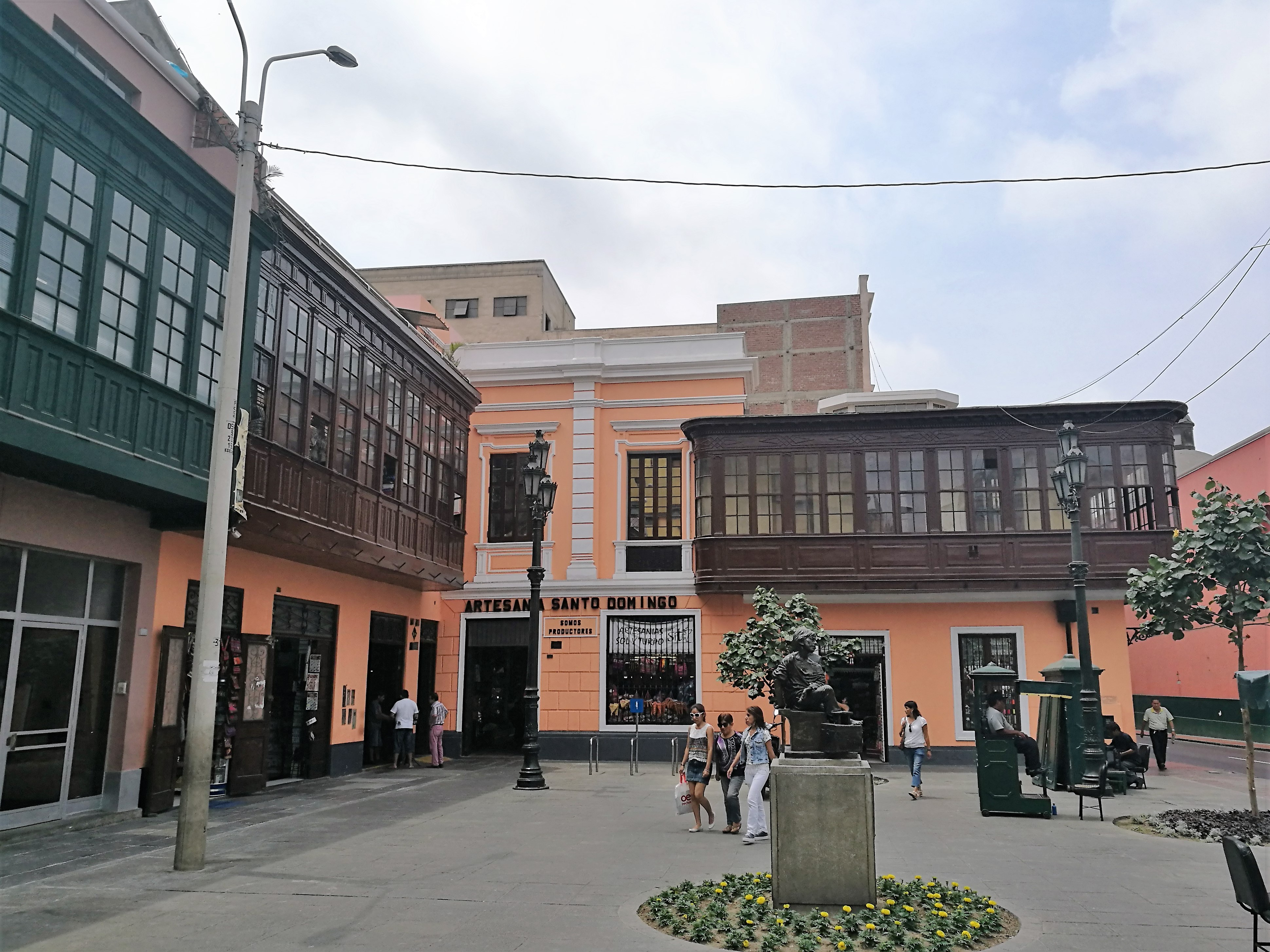
The square in 2017.

The Plazuela de Santo Domingo is located across the street from the convent. It is one of the oldest in Lima, and the site of the former home of María Alvarado, who arrived in the city alongside Pedro de Alvarado's expedition. Alvarado was a widow of Captain Martín de Astete of the Spanish Army, later marrying Captain Francisco de Chávez, who died during the Almagrist forces' assault on the Casa de Pizarro. She finally married Captain Pedro Portocarrero. It is also said that Blasco Núñez Vela, the first Viceroy of Peru, was also imprisoned here. The space was purchased by the Dominicans, who demanded that it belonged to them, later selling it to the Cabildo of Lima for 1,000 pesos.

After the War of the Pacific, the Hotel de Francia e Inglaterra was built in the area. It has since sported a republican appearance, with boxed balconies and, since 1984, a small bronze monument by Humberto Hoyos Guevara dedicated to the shoeshiners that are commonly found there. Another monument is dedicated to Augusto Pérez Araníbar.

Renovation works in the square took place from 2021 to 2022. The works involved the removal of two statues, one dedicated to shoeshiner children (El Petiso) and a second one dedicated to philanthropist Augusto Pérez Araníbar.

== See also ==
- Jirón Camaná
- 17th-century Western domes
- Dominican Order in Peru

== Bibliography ==
- Juan Meléndez, O.P. "Tesoros Verdaderos de Indias", 1681.
- Collection “Documental del Perú”, Departamento de Lima, Volume XV, Third Edition, April 1973, "SANTO DOMINGO, Santa Rosa y San Martín de Porras descansan bajo su mole", pages 46–48.
- “ITINERARIOS DE LIMA” by Héctor Velarde, Patronage of Lima, Second Edition, 1990, "Convento e Iglesia de Santo Domingo", pages 37–41.
- "GUIDE TO PERU", Handbook for travelers, 6th Edition, by Gonzalo de Reparaz Ruiz, publisher Ediciones de Arte Rep, Lima - Peru, Book published in English by the Tourism Promotion Fund of Peru - FOPTUR, "SANTO DOMINGO (Church and Convent of)", pages 102-103
- Felipe Acosta Burga, "Atractivos de Lima", Publisher National Police of Peru, Lima, 1997.
- Convento de Santo Domingo, "Álbum del Convento de Santo Domingo en el cuarto centenario de su fundación con la ciudad de Lima, 18 de enero de 1535-18 de enero de 1935", Publisher Excelsior, Lima, 1935.
- Genealogical information of Friar Diego Maroto, Dominican, native to Camarena (Toledo Province), pretender to notary of the Court of the Inquisition of Lima 1660–1662. Document published by the Ministry of Education of Spain. Located by Gabriela Lavarello de Velaochaga
