= Dominican Order in Peru =

Province of Saint John the Baptist of Peru

Catholic
- Incumbent: Friar Luis Galindo Silva

Location
- Country: Peru
- Headquarters: Santo Domingo, Lima

Information
- Established: January 4, 1540

Current leadership
- Parent church: Roman Catholic Church
- Pope: Leo XIV

Website
- peru.op.org

The Province of Saint John the Baptist of Peru (Spanish: Provincia de San Juan Bautista del Perú) is the ecclesiastical province through which the Dominican Order (Order of Preachers) operates in Peru. It was created on January 4, 1540.

It is headed by a prior. Since January 26, 2026, the province's prior is Friar Luis Galindo Silva.

== History ==
The province was created on January 4, 1540, by the Master General of the Order of Preachers, Friar Agustín Recuperato de Favencia. It was headquartered at the Convent of the Holy Rosary. The Order's study room led to the establishment of the National University of San Marcos (then the Royal and Pontifical University of the City of the Kings of Lima) and its later autonomous Faculty of Theology.

Known members of the Order include saints Rose of Lima, Martin de Porres, and John Macias, as well as blessed Ana of the Angels Monteagudo.

== Governance ==
The province is headed by a prior chosen by the chapter's friars.

- Juan José Salaverry Villarreal (2010 — 2018; reelected in 2014)
- Rómulo Vásquez Gavidia (2018 — 2026)
- Luis Galindo Silva (January 26, 2026 — present)

== Institutions ==
=== Religious ===
- Arequipa
  - Monastery of Saint Catherine of Siena
  - Convent of Saint Peter the Apostle
- Chimbote
  - Parish of Saint Peter the Apostle
- Cuzco
  - Church and Convent of Saint Dominic
- Lima
  - Basilica and Convent of Our Lady of the Rosary (Santo Domingo)
  - Monastery of Saint Catherine of Siena
  - Monastery of Saint Rose of Lima (Santa Rosa de las Monjas)
  - Sanctuary of Saint Rose of Lima (Santa Rosa de los Padres)
  - Convent of Saint Albertus Magnus
- Trujillo
  - Church and Convent of Saint Dominic

=== Educational ===
- Lima
  - Casa Bartolomé de las Casas
  - Casa Beato Jordán de Sajonia
  - Facultad de Teología Pontificia y Civil de Lima
- Trujillo
  - Casa San Pedro Mártir

== See also ==
- Catholic Church in Peru
