= Faculty of Pontifical and Civil Theology of Lima =

Autonomous pontifical institution in Peru

- Facultad de Teología Pontificia y Civil de Lima
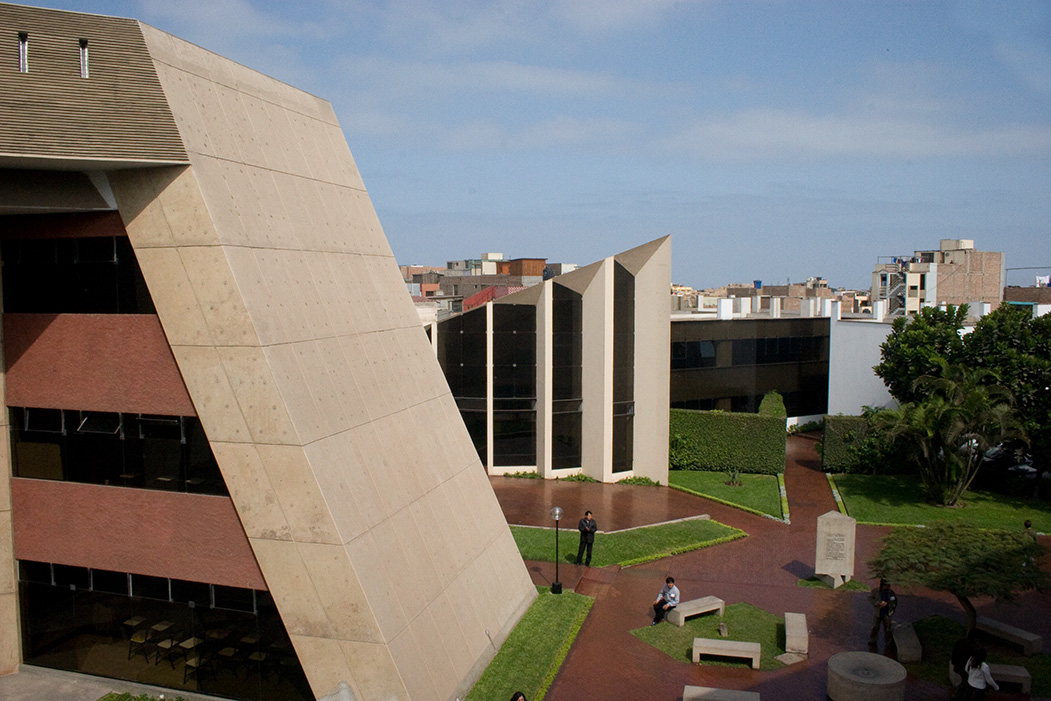
- Established: May 12, 1551 (475 years ago) (Note: Established through Royal Decree as a faculty of the National University of San Marcos.); June 28, 1935 (90 years ago) (Note: Established through Decree-Law as an autonomous entity.)
- Founders: Charles I of Spain
- Affiliations: Holy See; University of San Marcos (to 1935)
- Chancellor: Carlos Castillo
- Rector: Pedro Hidalgo Díaz
- Students: 409 (2020)
- Location: Lima, Peru; 12°05′01″S 77°04′09″W
- Colours: Gold Navy Blue
- Website: ftpcl.edu.pe

The Faculty of Pontifical and Civil Theology of Lima (Spanish: Facultad de Teología Pontificia y Civil de Lima; FTPCL) is a pontifical institution located in Lima, Peru. It was officially established in 1551 as a faculty of the National University of San Marcos, from which it separated in 1935. Although it has since maintained its title of faculty, it is equal in status to a university and is licensed by SUNEDU.

The faculty, headquartered in Pueblo Libre District, provides academic theological education related to medieval philosophy, as well as the Latin language.

== History ==
The Province of Saint John the Baptist—an ecclesiastical province of the Dominican Order—was created on January 4, 1540, by the Master General of the Order of Preachers, Friar Agustín Recuperato de Favencia. It was headquartered at the Convent of the Holy Rosary. He also instructed the creation of a "studio" (university) to train lecturers in Arts (philosophy) and Theology.

The superiors of the new Province met in Cuzco on July 1, 1548. They decided to establish and implement the "school" in the city of Lima, with a few students and professors. The Estudio General, created from this meeting, was headquartered at the aforementioned convent. Almost three years later, with theological studies underway, by Royal Decree of May 12, 1551, the King of Spain created the Pontifical University of the City of Kings of Lima, with all the privileges of the University of Salamanca. Theological studies were incorporated into this university, serving as its foundation. Thus, the Faculty of Theology was established, the first faculty of the new university. Saint Pius V also approved it with the brief "Exponi Nobis," dated July 26, 1571. In 1574, it adopted the name University of San Marcos.

With the reforms undertaken in the mid-19th century by the government of Peru, the Faculty began to operate in an environment provided by the Seminary of Saint Turibius, under the jurisdiction of the Archbishopric and with full academic and administrative autonomy, while remaining, as until then, the first Faculty of what is now the National University of San Marcos.

On June 28, 1935, following a lengthy period autonomisation, the Faculty of Theology separated from San Marcos with the full acquiescence of the civil authorities through Decree-Law No. 7824, while retaining its original title. The Congregation for Catholic Education, for its part, definitively approved its new Statutes by Decree of December 10, 1993. The State, by Law No. 26327 of June 2, 1994, incorporated it into the Peruvian University System, maintaining its pontifical and civil character. It has the same duties and rights as other universities in the country. By mandate of Decree Law No. 18009 of November 25, 1969, it retains its historical name of Faculty. This privilege, granted by its history and presence in Peru, has also been recognized by the Congress of the Republic of Peru, as it is the oldest university entity in Peru and in the Americas.

== Organisation ==
=== Governance and administration ===
The faculty is administered by a rector. The Archbishop of Lima serves as its grand chancellor.

The list of rectors is as follows:

- Luis Cordero Rodríguez (2003–2005)
- Pedro Hidalgo Díaz (2005–present)

=== Academic structure ===
The faculty offers undergraduate studies in education and theology, a doctorate in theology, and master's degrees in Sacred Theology with a specialization in Dogmatic Theology, Education with a specialization in Guidance and Tutoring and Education with a specialization in Educational Institution Management.

== See also ==
- Seminario de Lima
