= Artesonado =

Ceiling in Spanish Mudéjar architecture

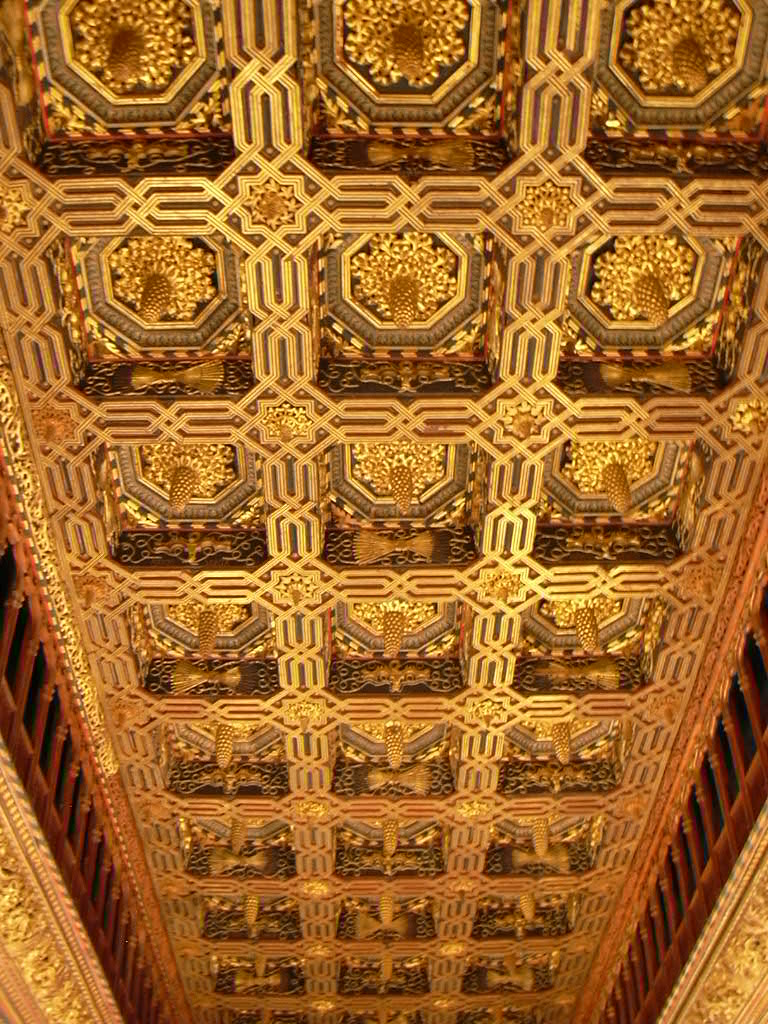
Artesonado in the Throne Room of the Aljafería in Zaragoza, Spain

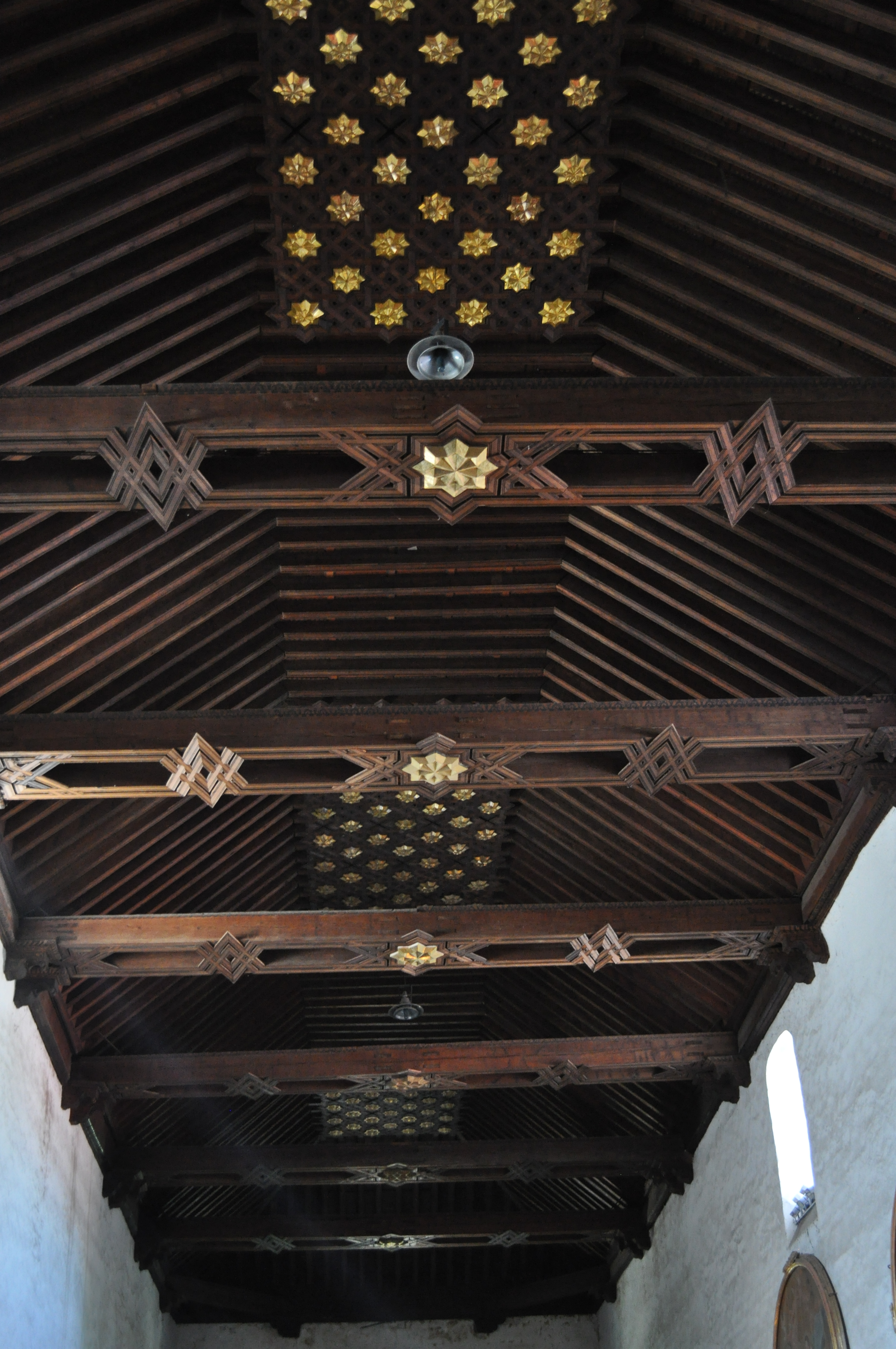
Artesonado in the Tlaxcala City Cathedral, Mexico

Artesonado or Spanish ceiling is a term for "a type of intricately joined wooden ceiling in which supplementary laths are interlaced into the rafters supporting the roof to form decorative geometric patterns", found in Spanish architecture. It is an example of Mudéjar style.

Artesonado decoration is usually in regular recesses between the rafter beams and the woodwork is gilded or painted. It originated in the Islamic regions of North Africa and Al-Andalus, as can be seen at the Nasrid palace of the Alhambra, and was introduced into the Iberian Christian kingdoms by Muslim craftsmen during the Christian reconquest of the Iberian Peninsula. The name comes from the Spanish word artesa, a shallow basin used in bread making.

Beginning in the 13th century, artesonado ceilings continued to be built through the Spanish Renaissance in the 15th and 16th centuries, with a change of the motifs to a classical Greco-Roman style.

Notable examples of artesonado ceilings include those in the throne room of the Aljafería (Zaragoza), the Chapterhouse of Toledo Cathedral, and the Royal Convent of Santa Clara (Tordesillas). The Spanish National Sculpture Museum also has a Spanish ceiling collection.

Original artesonado ceilings, although expensive to transport and difficult to reassemble, were bought by private collectors during the 20th century and can be currently found, for example, in the Hearst Castle, Metropolitan Museum of New York, Fine Arts Museum of San Francisco, Thomas Aquinas College of Ventura County, California, Worcester Art Museum in Massachusetts, and Instituto Helenístico de Ciudad de México.

== Gallery ==
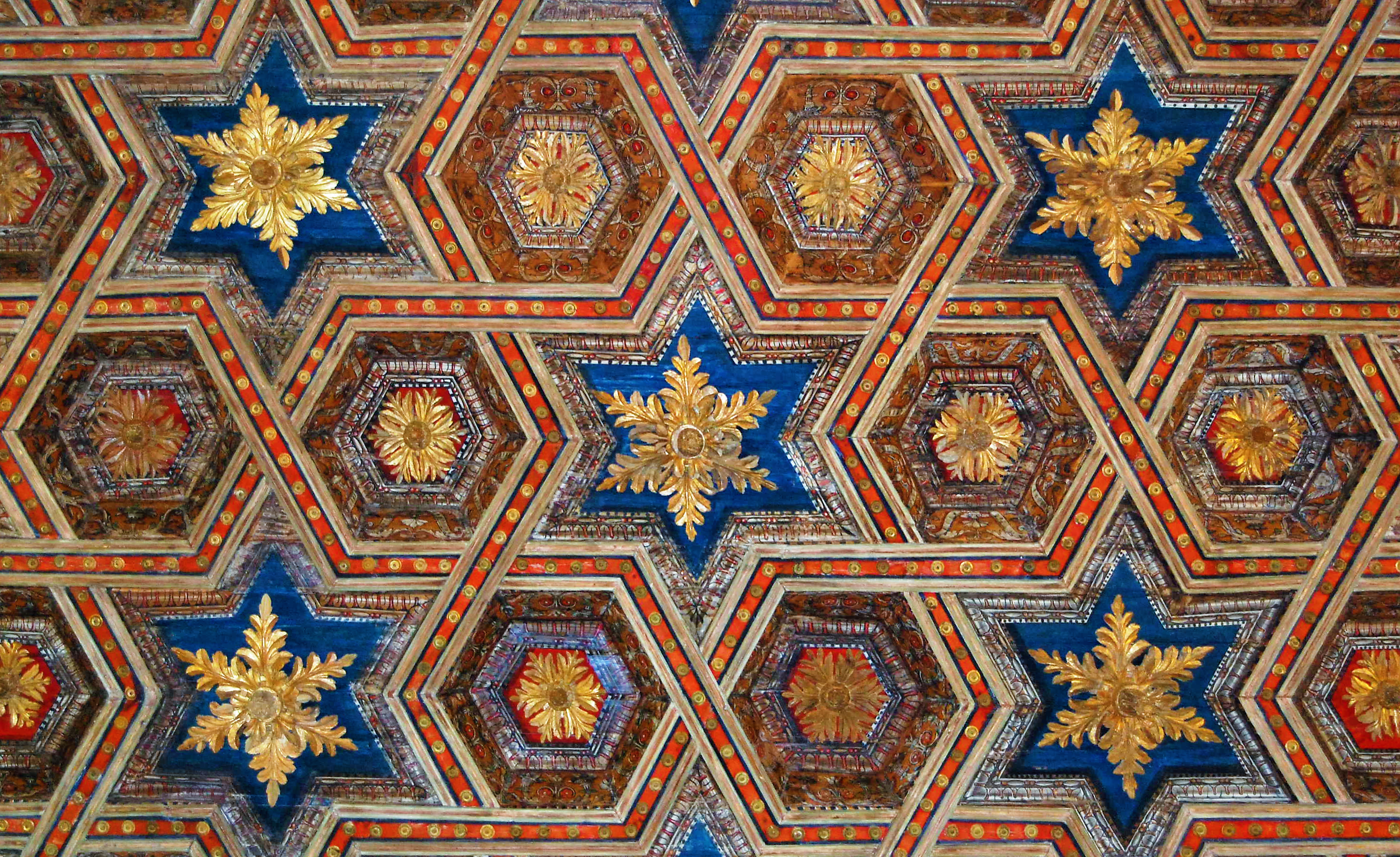
Detail of the coffered ceiling of the Auditorium of the University of Alcalá (Spain, 1520)

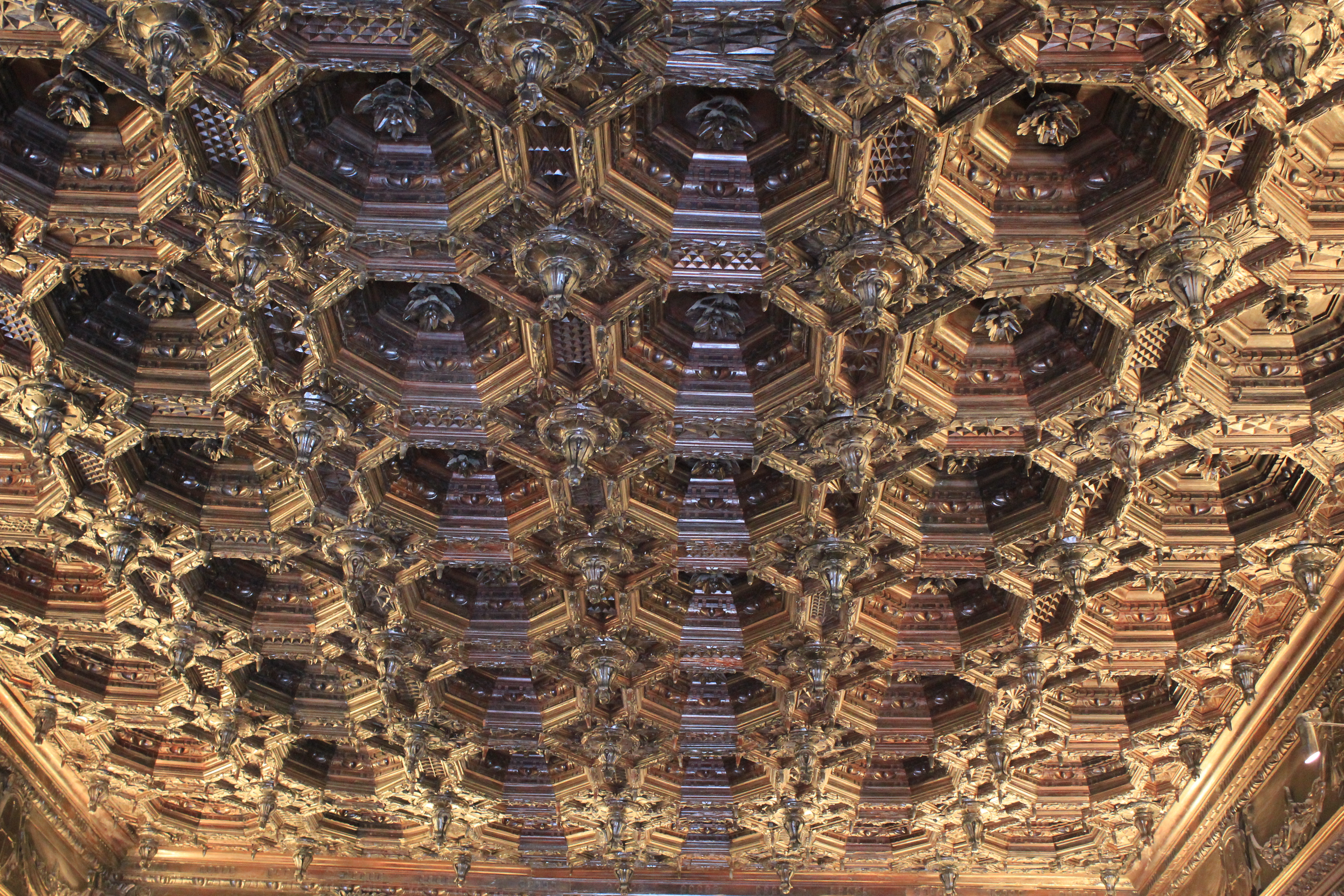
Artesonado dated to 1580 in the Basilica and Convent of Santo Domingo Lima, Peru

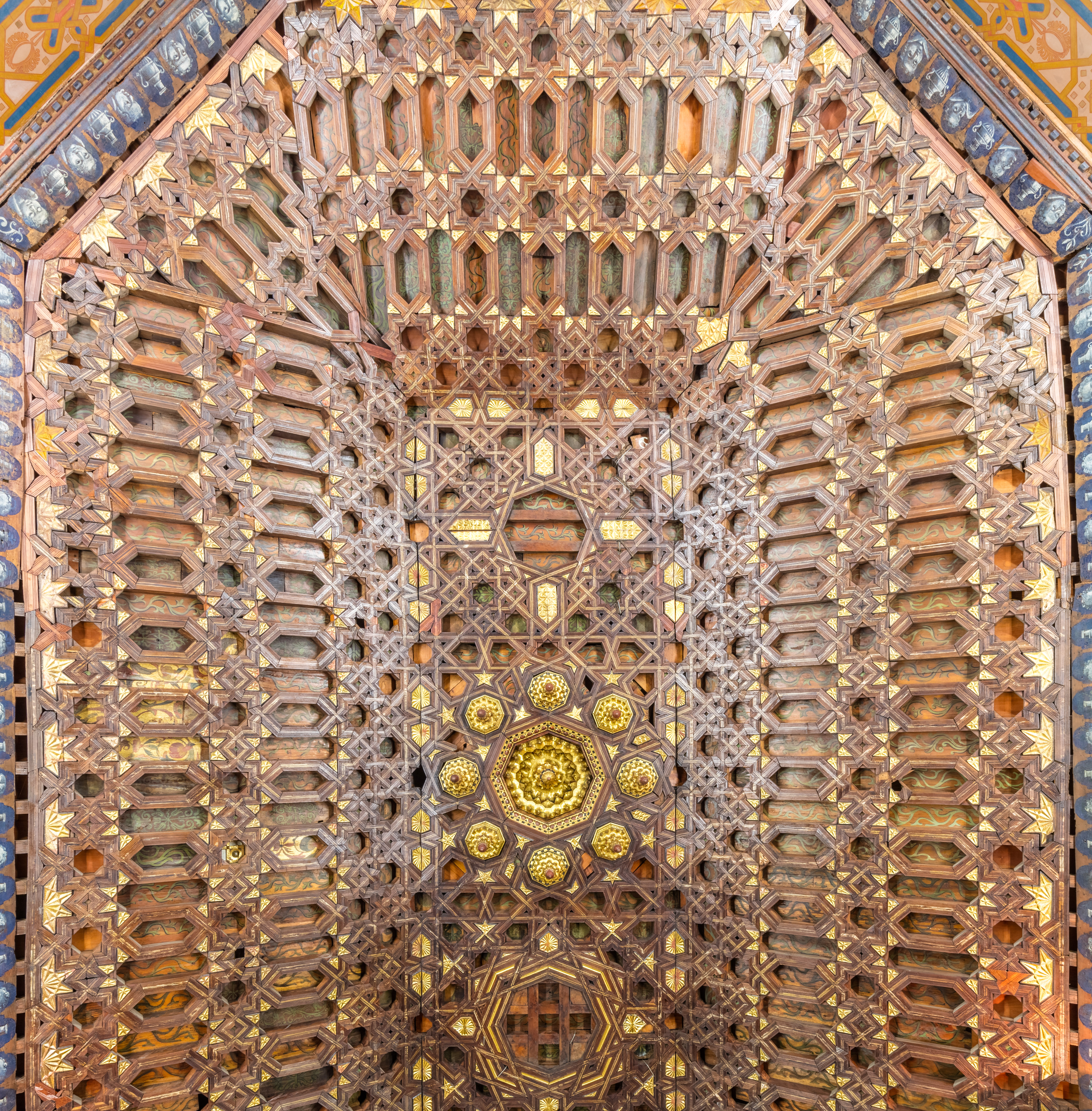
Basilica and Convent of San Francisco, Quito, Ecuador

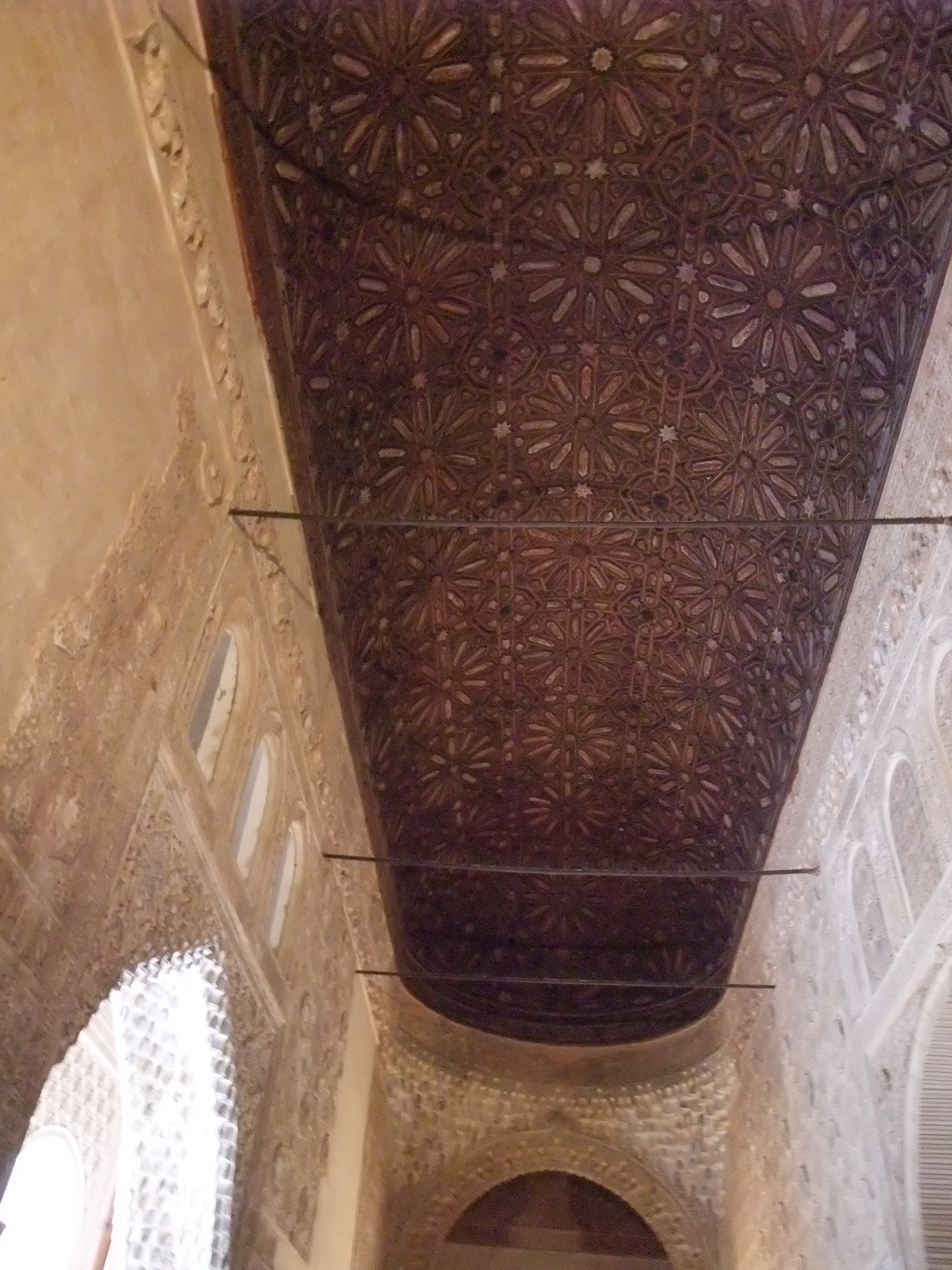
Alhambra Palace, Granada, Spain
