= Diego Maroto =

Peruvian architect of the 17th century

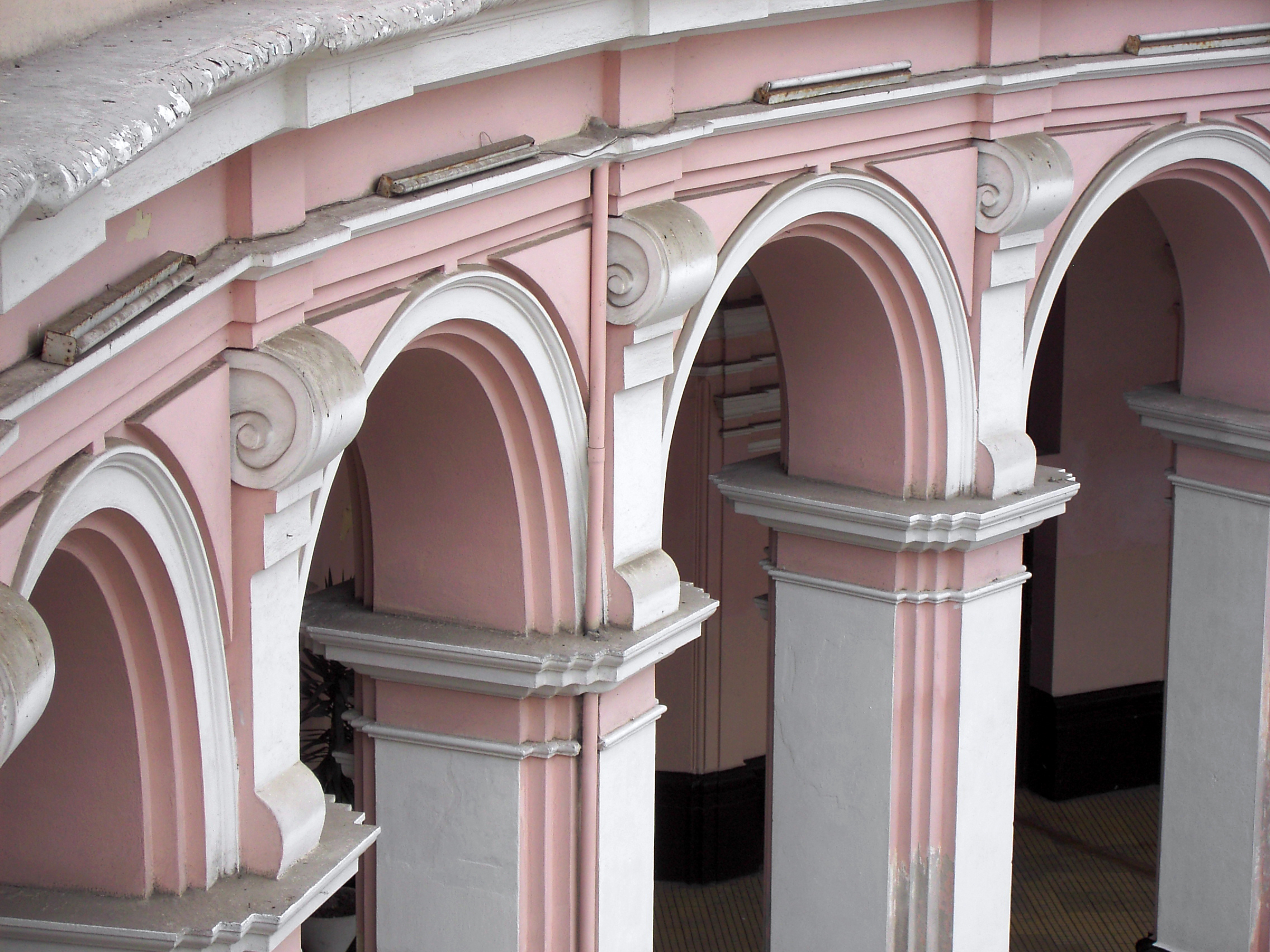
The round cloister at Colegio de Santo Tomás in Lima, Peru

Fray Diego Maroto (7 May 1618 Camarena, Toledo (Spain)–1696) was the most important Peruvian architect of the second half of the 17th century.

Maroto born in Camarena, Spain, he occupied the positions of Maestro Mayor de Fabricas de la Catedral Metropolitana, supervisor of the unions of architects and Maestro Mayor de las Fabricas Reales during a four decade-long period of major civil construction projects in Lima.

As an architect of the Dominican Order, Maroto developed a vault resistant to earthquakes. The technique was imitated after the earthquake of 1687 in many monumental constructions in Lima, like the Cathedral of Lima and the Church of the Convent of San Agustín the Great of Lima. His works include those for the male and female convents in the city of Lima, the parishes, and the Metropolitan cathedral. His most important work was the College of Saint Thomas (Colegio de Santo Tomás). The major cloister of the school is the only round cloister in South America.

== Works of Diego Maroto (selection) ==
- 1650: Church of Vera Cruz
- 1653: Belfry of the Monastery de La Concepción
- 1659: Belfry of the Dominican Convent of Nuestra Señora del Rosario
- 1662: A cloister of the Jesuit Convent of San Pablo
- 1663: Church of Sagrario next to the Cathedral of Lima
- 1663 - 1668: College of Saint Thomas
- 1679: conversion of the convent church of Nuestra Señora del Rosario
- 1680: Cupola of Sagrario
- 1688 until 1692: Reconstruction of the vaults of the Cathedral of Lima

== Bibliography ==
- San Cristóbal Sebastián, Antonio. Fray Diego Maroto, Alarife de Lima 1617–1696, Lima: Epígrafe S.A. editores, 1996.
- Vargas Ugarte, Ruben. Ensayo de un diccionario de alarifes, Lima. 1942
