= Santa Catalina de Siena, Lima =

Church in Lima, Peru

Coordinates: 12.0551°S 77.0264°W

Saint Catherine of Siena
- Iglesia y Monasterio de Santa Catalina de Siena
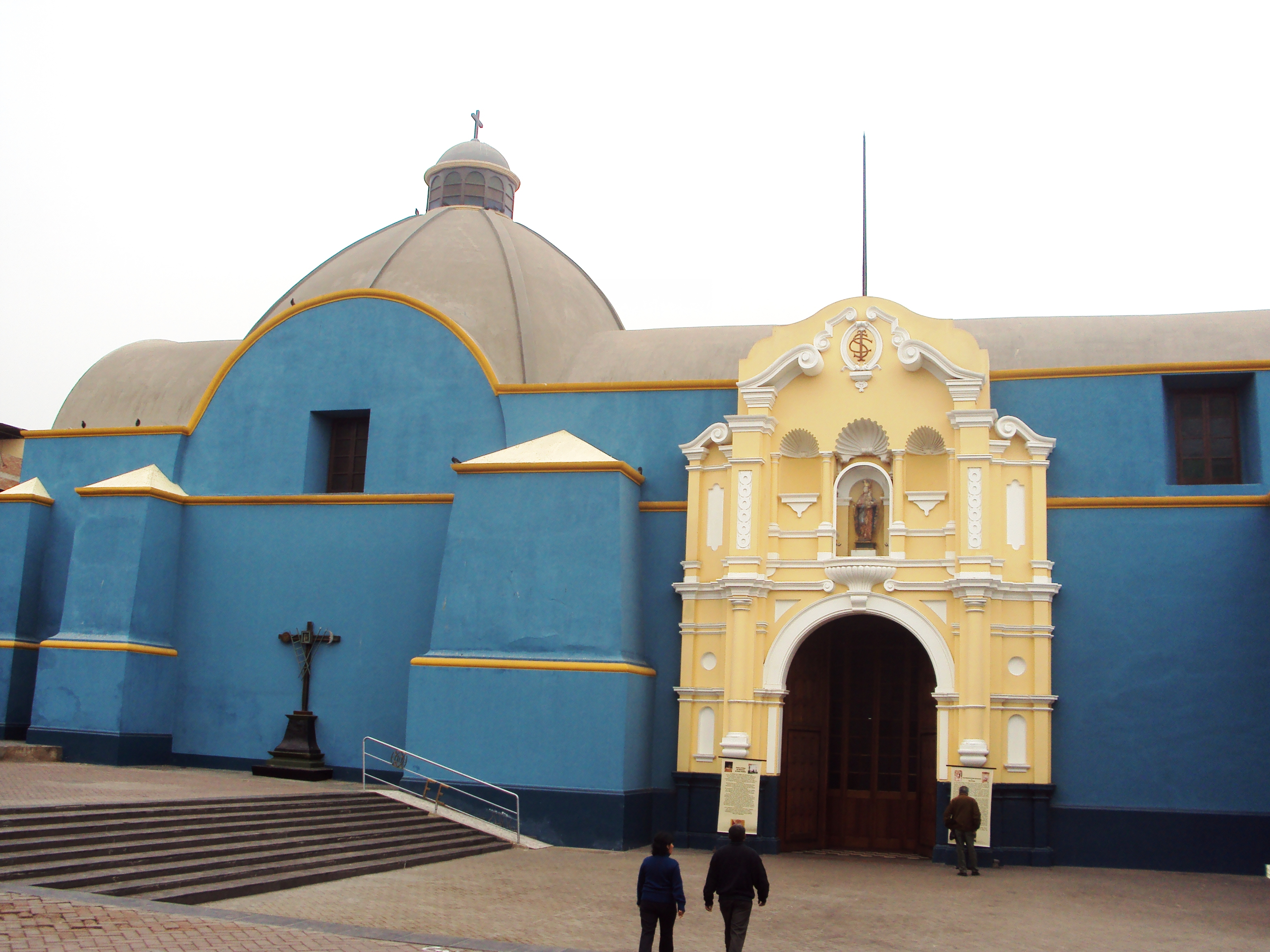
- The church in 2010

Religion
- Affiliation: Catholic
- Governing body: Archdiocese of Lima

Location
- Location: Barrios Altos

Architecture
- Style: Baroque, Rococo
- Completed: 1624

The Church and Monastery of Saint Catherine of Siena (Spanish: Iglesia y Monasterio de Santa Catalina de Siena) is a Catholic church and monastery located between Andahuaylas, Puno and Inambari streets in the neighbourhood of Barrios Altos, part of the historic centre of Lima, Peru. It is located next to the Fort of Santa Catalina, built two centuries later and named after the convent.

The monastery hosts the denomination of the same name: the Señor del Santuario de Santa Catalina. It was declared a Cultural heritage of Peru in 2022, under resolution N° 000121-2022-VMPCIC/MC.

== History ==
The monastery dates back to 1589, when María de Celis, grandmother of the then Archbishop of Mexico, attempted to establish the first monastery of the Dominican Order in Lima, speaking to the religious and local authorities of the city. The licences were easily granted by both Pope Sixtus V and King Philip II of Spain, but as the preparations for the construction were to take place, Celis passed away and the work was stopped due to lack of budget.

In 1607, Rose of Lima continued the efforts for the creation of a monastery, obtaining land and an image of Saint Catherine of Siena from Rome, which to this day is exhibited in the choir of the Monastery. According to tradition, Rose met and spoke to Lucia Guerra de la Daga, a 30-year-old mother of three, who, despite her initial reluctance, transferred all her assets by public deed for the service of the new Monastery, allowing construction to begin years later.

The monastery was completed in 1624 and 33 young women were chosen from the many who were waiting for the opening of this new monastery. At the same time, the Archbishop of Lima requested 7 other nuns. On February 10, 1624, the doors of temple were opened. For the occasion, a great procession is organized from the Cathedral, presided over by the Viceroy, followed by the staff of the Cabildo and the people of Lima.

During its first 10 years, the convent housed 300 nuns.

== See also ==
- Fort of Santa Catalina, Lima
