= Augusto Pérez Araníbar =

Peruvian physician (1858–1958)

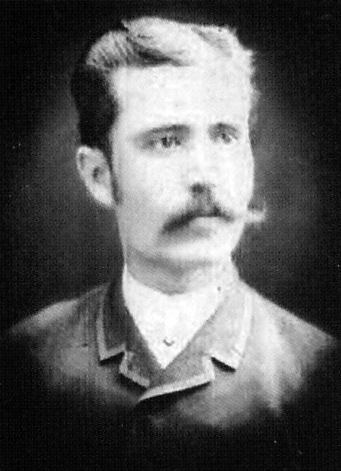
- Born: 26 October 1858; Arequipa, Peru
- Died: 17 March 1958 (aged 99); Lima, Peru

Augusto Pérez Araníbar (26 October 1858 – 17 March 1948) was a Peruvian physician and philanthropist concerned with social aspects of Peru. He promoted great works of social significance mostly during his tenure as director of the Public Charitable Society of Lima. He was the son of Manuel Pérez Araníbar and María Hurtado y Tapia.

== Education ==
Pérez studied at the Faculty of Medicine of the Universidad Nacional Mayor of San Marcos. Along with other medical students he offered his professional services to the government on 4 April 1879, as soon as war was declared by Chile. Pérez was incorporated into the fourth ambulance as a trainee on September 29. He participated in an expedition that brought medicine to the besieged Arica square in 1880. He attended to the wounded at the Battle of San Juan on 13 January and at the Battle of Miraflores on 15 January 1881. He fulfilled his duties until the conclusion of the war.

He completed his bachelor's degree in 1882 with a thesis which he documented his observations made in the field hospitals during the war: Heridas por arma de Fuego y su influencia sobre la diátesis (Gunshot Wounds and their influence on Diathesis). He graduated as a doctor in 1883. He also graduated with a BA and a PhD thesis on Investigación de los venenos orgánicos y Aguas Medicinales (Investigation of organic poisons and medicinal waters).

== Career ==
Pérez was promoted to the rank of surgeon major in the army in 1885, and perhaps on official business, he returned to his hometown. He was elected deputy for the province of Castile from 1892 to 1894, went to the legislature in 1893. He subsequently stayed away from politics.

While travelling in Europe in 1903, he became interested in investigating advances in the treatment of gastric diseases and the construction of hospitals. As delegate of Peru, he attended the International Medical Congress held in Madrid, during which he was commissioned to deliver the speech at the closing session and went to the United States. Back in Lima, he was incorporated into the Society of Public Welfare in 1905, and subsequently elected assistant director from 1913 to 1916 and director from 1916 to 1918.

== Social work ==
As director of the Public Charitable Society of Lima he proposed the execution of works on health care among which are: the Perez Araníbar children's home, constructed on an area of 108,000 m^{2} in which all created schools were grouped for the care of orphans; the Archbishop Loayza Hospital for the care of women, a nocturnal asylum to offer shelter for up to three nights to men and women who possibly had no roof and cradles attached to factories for nursing mothers.
