= Juan de Uceda =

Spanish painter

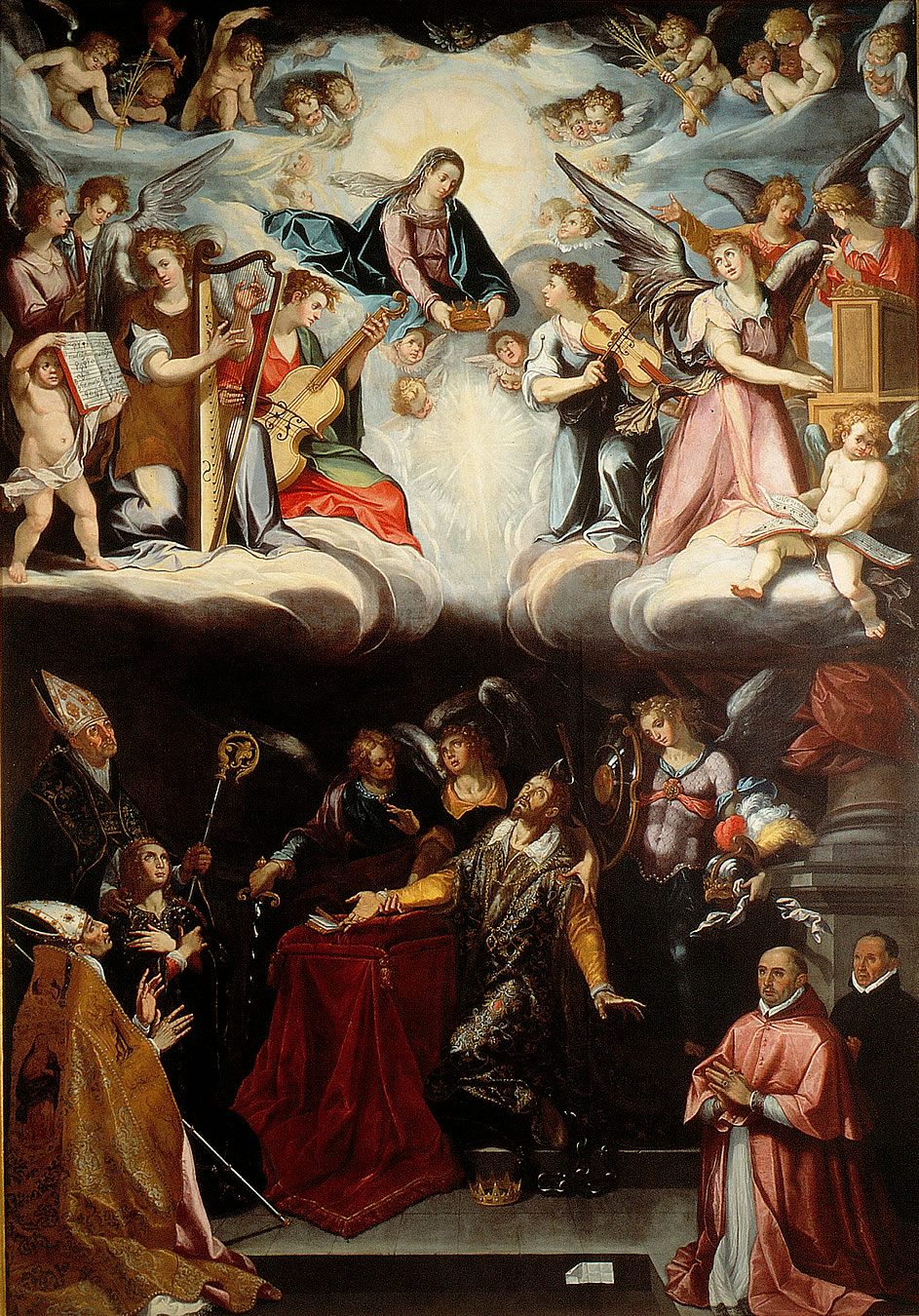
The Transit of Saint Hermengild

Juan de Uceda (Seville, 1570 – Seville, 1631) was a Spanish painter. Formerly a student of Alonso Vázquez, he is known for his religious work. Some of his paintings can be seen today in the Museum of Fine Arts of Seville.

He worked in Lima for a year in 1609, "for the service of parish churches and monasteries and convents of friars and nuns of the said city"; his son Gaspar died there a few years later.
