= Camarena =

Coordinates: 40.087°N 4.117°W

- municipality
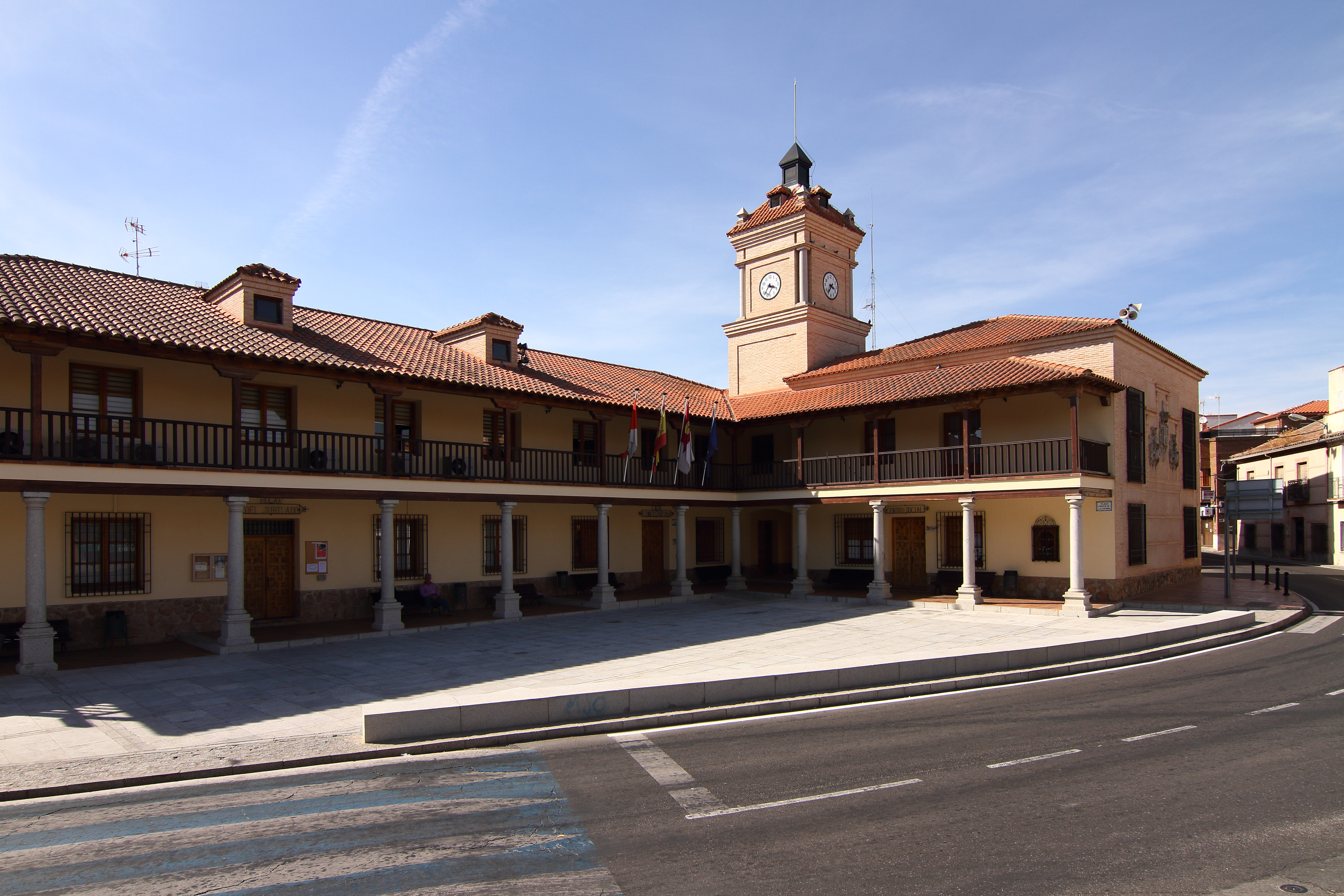
- Town Hall

- Flag Coat of arms

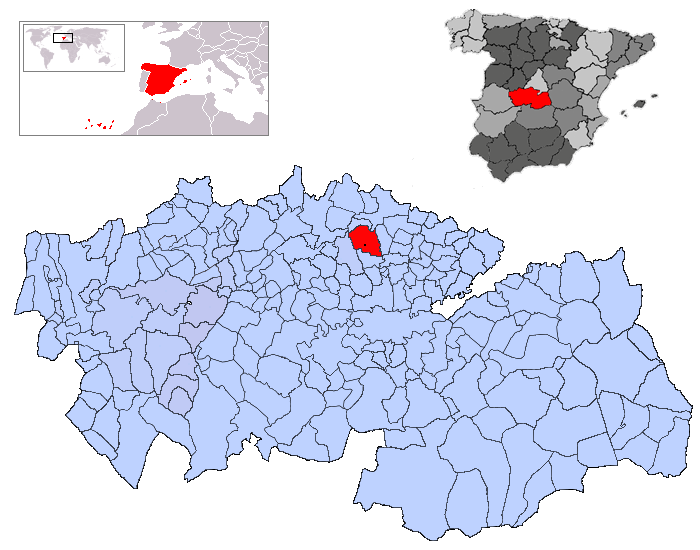
- Country: Spain
- Autonomous community: Castile-La Mancha
- Province: Toledo
- Municipality: Camarena

Area
  - Total: 66 km^{2} (25 sq mi)
- Elevation: 575 m (1,886 ft)

Population (2025-01-01)
  - Total: 4,848
  - Density: 73/km^{2} (190/sq mi)
- Time zone: UTC+1 (CET)
  - Summer (DST): UTC+2 (CEST)

Camarena is a municipality located in the province of Toledo, Castile-La Mancha, Spain. According to the 2024 census (INE), the municipality has a population of 4634 inhabitants. It is renowned for its wines and wine industry.

== History ==
Camarena's origins date back to prehistoric times, with evidence of Carpetani settlements before Roman rule. During the Arab period, the region flourished through agricultural innovations until it was reconquered by Alfonso VI. In the Middle Ages, King Alfonso X "The Wise" stayed in the town for several months, and in 1498, the Catholic Monarchs granted Camarena a royal charter, freeing it from feudal rule. The town developed through the centuries, with viticulture playing a key role in its economy. It endured hardships during the Spanish Civil War but later rebuilt and thrived, preserving its rich historical and cultural legacy.

== Economy ==
=== Wine and Winemaking Industry ===
Wine is one of Camarena’s most iconic products and the main economic driver of the town, thanks to its favorable climate and fertile soil. For centuries, a significant part of the population has been dedicated to winemaking, a tradition that continues today. Camarena is home to renowned wineries in Castilla-La Mancha.

=== Hunting ===
In the 1970s and 1980s, Camarena was part of the "Big Four" hunting grounds. Camarena's hunting industry peaked during this period, with private reserves offering premium hunting experiences, especially for red partridge. During Franco’s dictatorship, the region became linked to political and social elites, including figures like Francisco Franco, King Juan Carlos I, and business leaders.

== Culture ==
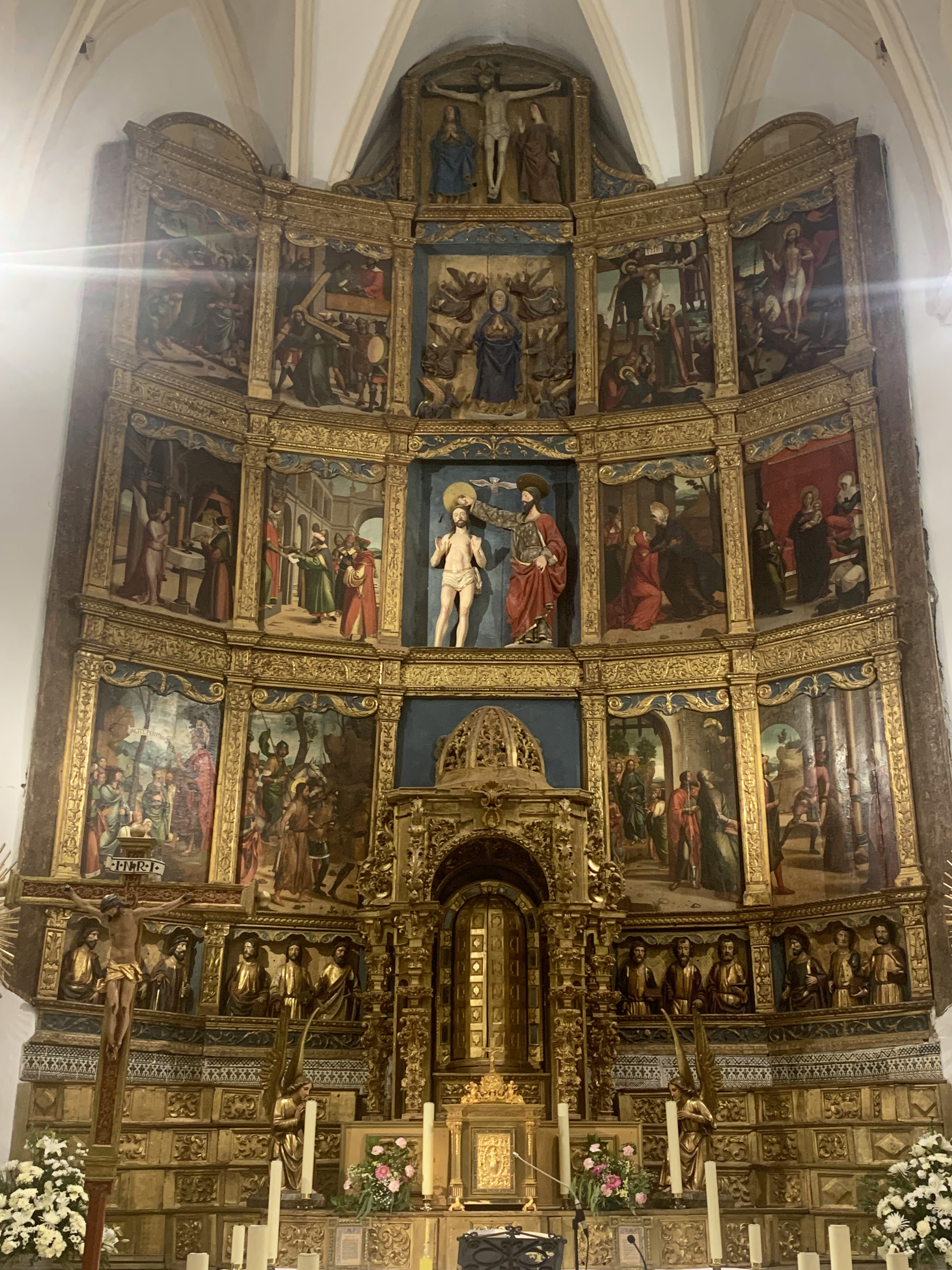
Church 's main Altarpiece

=== Heritage ===
- Church of San Juan Bautista: A 15th-century Gothic-Mudejar church with a remarkable Baroque altarpiece, considered a true gem. The altarpiece features paintings by Juan de Borgoña depicting scenes from the life of Saint John the Baptist and Jesus, and sculptures by Diego Copin de Holanda. In addition to this masterpiece, the church also houses other notable altarpieces, including the Renaissance altarpiece of the Virgin of Charity.
- Carriage of the Virgin of Charity: A richly decorated baroque carriage, believed to have been used for the coronation of King Luis I and donated to Camarena for religious processions.
- Hermitage of Cristo de la Sangre: A simple 16th-century chapel with a unique Baroque altarpiece.
- Convent of Nuestra Señora de la Concepción: Founded in 1562, with part of its original structure preserved.
- Main Square and Town Hall: Dating back to the 16th–17th centuries, rebuilt in the late 20th century, retaining historical elements like shields.

=== Intangible Heritage & Festivals ===
Key celebrations include the Feast of the Virgin of Charity (August 15), Saint John the Baptist (June 24), and traditional customs like the "Quema de Judas" (Burning of Judas) on Easter Sunday, carried out by the "Quintos". They build an arch in the main square, where a straw figure of Judas — often representing a public figure in a humorous way — is placed. After the Resurrection procession, they set the Judas figure on fire, causing a spectacular explosion, symbolizing the triumph of good over evil.
