= Church of Our Lady of Patronage, Lima =

Church in Peru

Coordinates: 12°02′09″S 77°01′32″W

Church of Our Lady of Patronage
- Iglesia de Nuestra Señora del Patrocinio
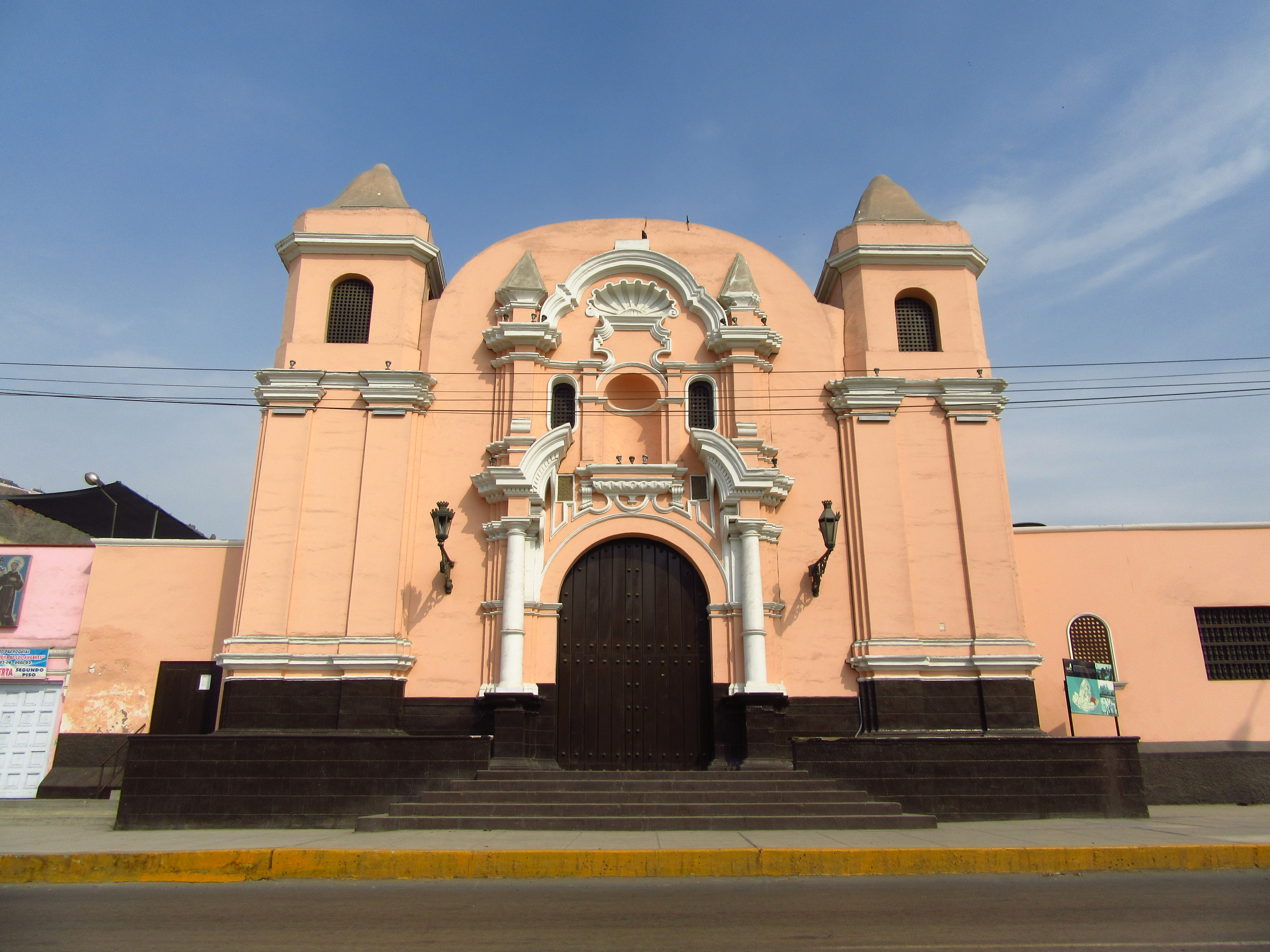

Religion
- Affiliation: Catholicism

Location
- Location: Jirón Manco Cápac 164, Rímac, Lima, Peru
- Interactive map of Church of Our Lady of Patronage

Architecture
- Style: Baroque
- Completed: 1754

The Church of Our Lady of Patronage (Spanish: Iglesia de Nuestra Señora del Patrocinio) is a Catholic church located in the traditional district of Rímac, part of the Historic Centre of Lima, Peru.

== History ==
The beguinage and the first chapel were completed in 1688. The temple as a whole was only completed in 1754. In 1919 the beguinage was transformed into the convent of the Dominican nuns of the Most Holy Rosary.

== Architecture ==
The temple is located at Jirón Manco Cápac 164, on the eastern side of the Alameda de los Descalzos, built in the 17th century. Next to this public space are also the Church of Saint Liberata and that of Our Lady of the Angels.

The Patrocinio is an atypical church, as its plan is rectangular, it lacks a transept, and it has a half-orange dome over the main chapel.
