= Iglesia del Sagrario (Lima) =

Church in Lima, Peru

Coordinates: 12.0463°S 77.0298°W

Church of the Sanctuary
- Sagrario Metropolitano de Lima
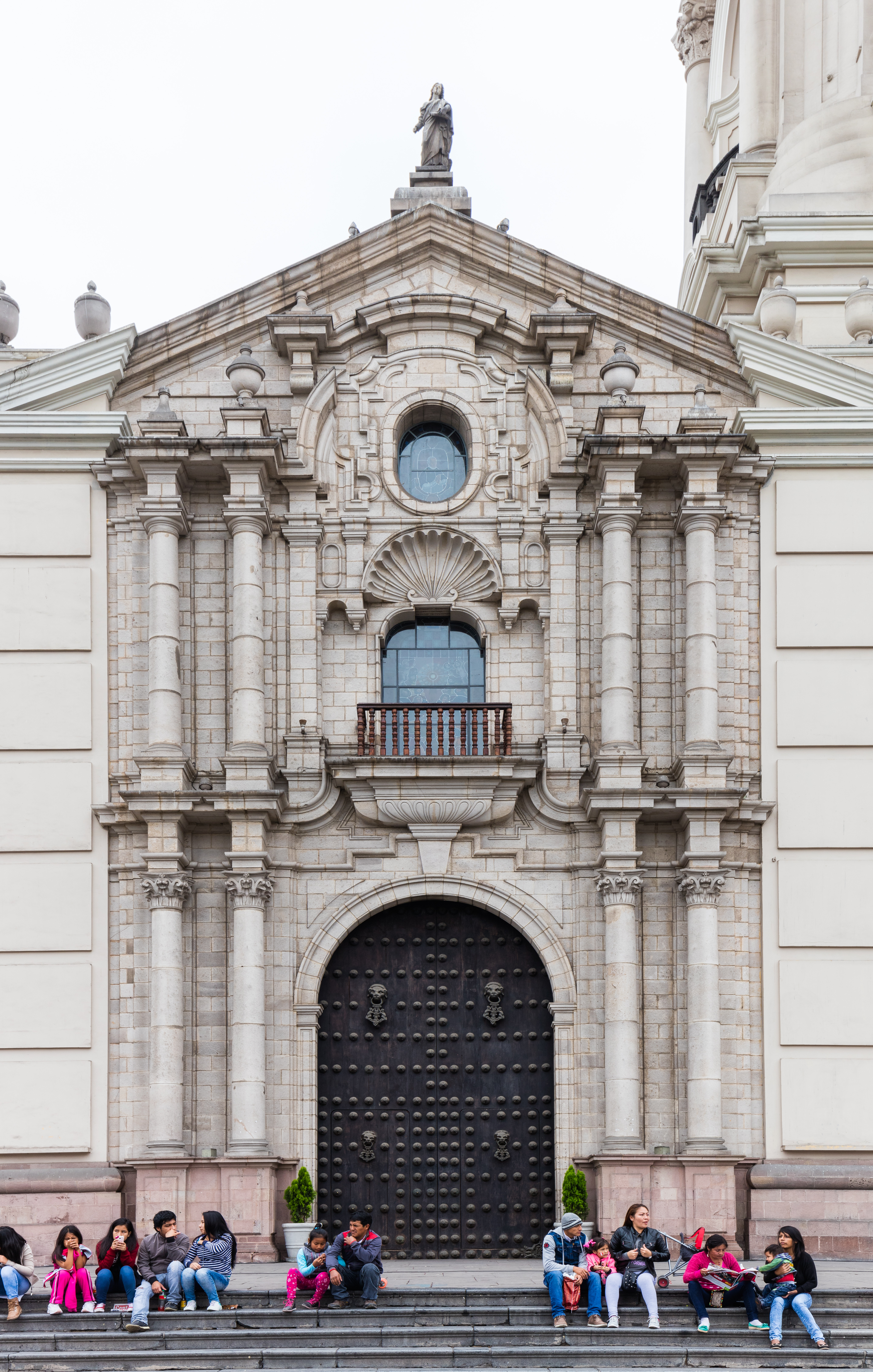

Religion
- Affiliation: Catholic
- Rite: Roman Rite
- Governing body: Archdiocese of Lima
- Status: Active

Location
- Location: Jirón Carabaya
- Interactive map of Church of the Sanctuary

Architecture
- Style: Neoclassical
- Completed: 1665

The Church of the Sanctuary (Spanish: Iglesia Parroquial del Sagrario) is a Catholic church in Lima, Peru. It is located on the second block of the Jirón Carabaya, between the Archbishop's Palace and the Cathedral, and facing the main square of the city. The building houses the baptism, marriage and death certificates of a number of important figures in the history of the city.

== History ==
The church was built in 1665, with construction taking two years. An image of Our Lady of the Waters was donated to the church by Alonso Cortés de Monroy during the late 17th century. On January 29, 1711, Fernando Hurtado y Quesada, the son of the Count of Cartago, stole the ciborium containing the hosts and hid them under an orange tree next to an acequia in the Alameda de los Descalzos, eventually being found. To commemorate the controversial event, Viceroy Diego Ladrón de Guevara ordered that a church be built on the site of the discovery. The new church, finished in 1716, was named after Saint Liberata.

The church was damaged during the earthquake of 1940, and its façade was subsequently restored by architect Emilio Harth Terré.

== See also ==
- Metropolitan Cathedral of Lima
