= Fountain of the Plaza Mayor, Lima =

Water fountain in Lima, Peru

Coordinates: 12°02′45″S 77°01′50″W

Fountain of the Plaza Mayor
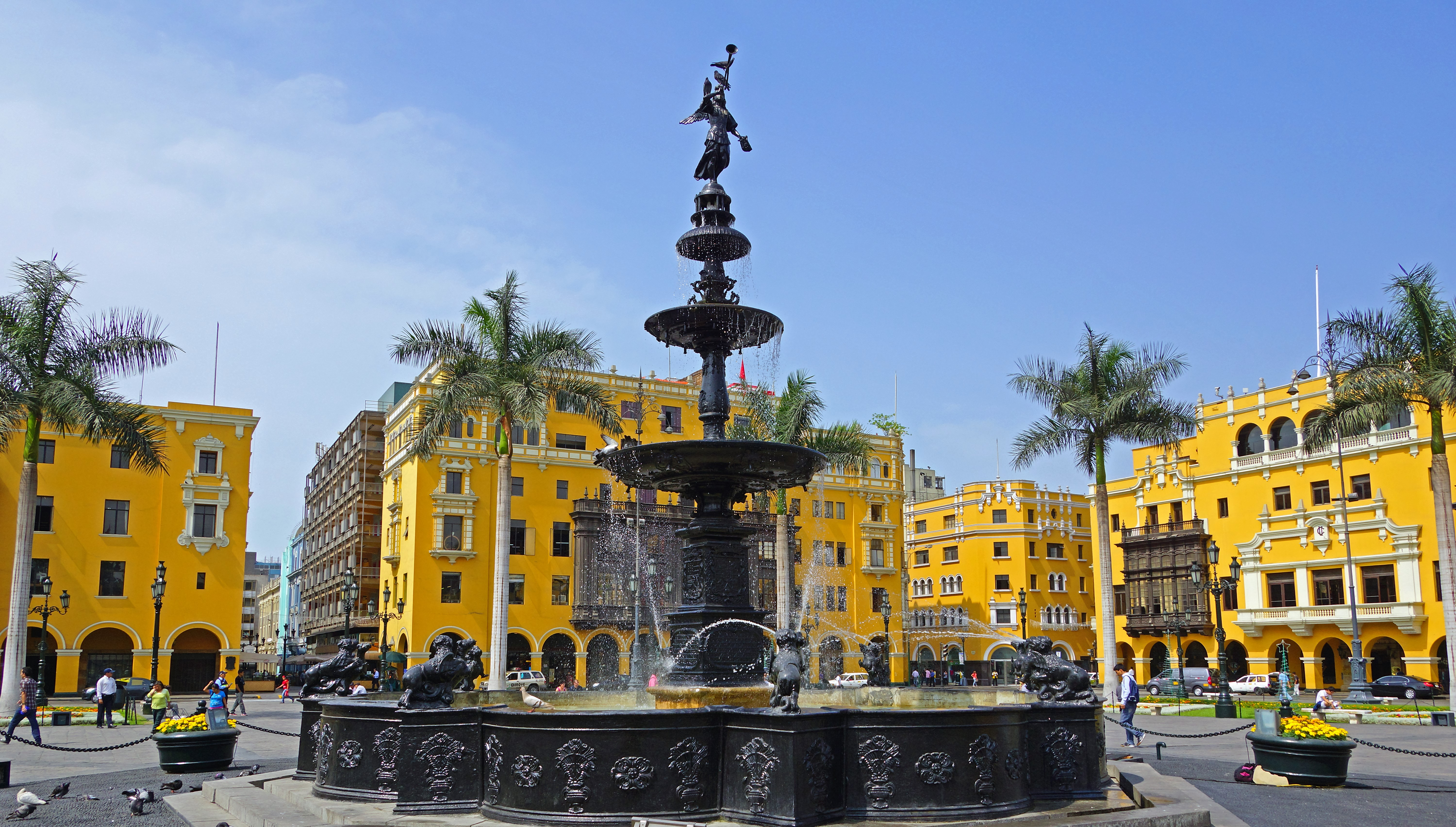
- Artist: Pedro de Noguera
- Completion date: 8 September 1651
- Location: Plaza Mayor, Lima

The Fountain of the Plaza Mayor is located in the square of the same name in the historic centre of Lima, Peru. Originally inaugurated in 1578, it has since been retouched and serves as the square's main feature, itself featuring a statue of Pheme, one of the gods of Ancient Greece.

== History ==
The first fountain built in the square was ordered to be built by Viceroy Francisco de Toledo and was inaugurated on October 21, 1578. It consisted of a baluster and a bowl, and in it eight masks with their pipes through which the water fell into the largest cup. On top of the cup there was a ball, which released all the water to fall on the cup. Above the ball was a figure of Pheme with a shield on one side with the arms of the city. In its hand was a flag and the arms of Viceroy Toledo was sculpted on it. The finishing of the overcup was made by the silversmiths Miguel Morcillo and Juan Ruiz. An unpublished record of the Cabildo of Lima corresponding to the year 1630 states that in addition to the coats of arms of Lima and Toledo, the fountain had the coat of arms of Spain and that of Francisco Pizarro.

This pool was replaced by another commissioned by the Viceroy Count of Salvatierra, and inaugurated on September 8, 1651, which, with some renovations, remains to this day. Its design is due to the sculptor Pedro de Noguera.

In 1900, Federico Elguera, then mayor of Lima, had the square renovated, including the fountain. During these works, the angel fell and broke, eventually disappearing. As a result, a replica replaced it in 1997.

Restoration works took place in 2015 after complaints regarding the fountain's state.

In 2018, the fountain was filled with Pisco to commemorate its national day, which was served to all visitors to the square on that date. Up to 1,500 litres were used in the fountain.

== See also ==
- Plaza Mayor, Lima
