= Metropolitan Cathedral of Lima =

Cultural heritage site in Lima, Peru

Cathedral Basilica of Lima
- Basílica Catedral de Lima (Spanish)
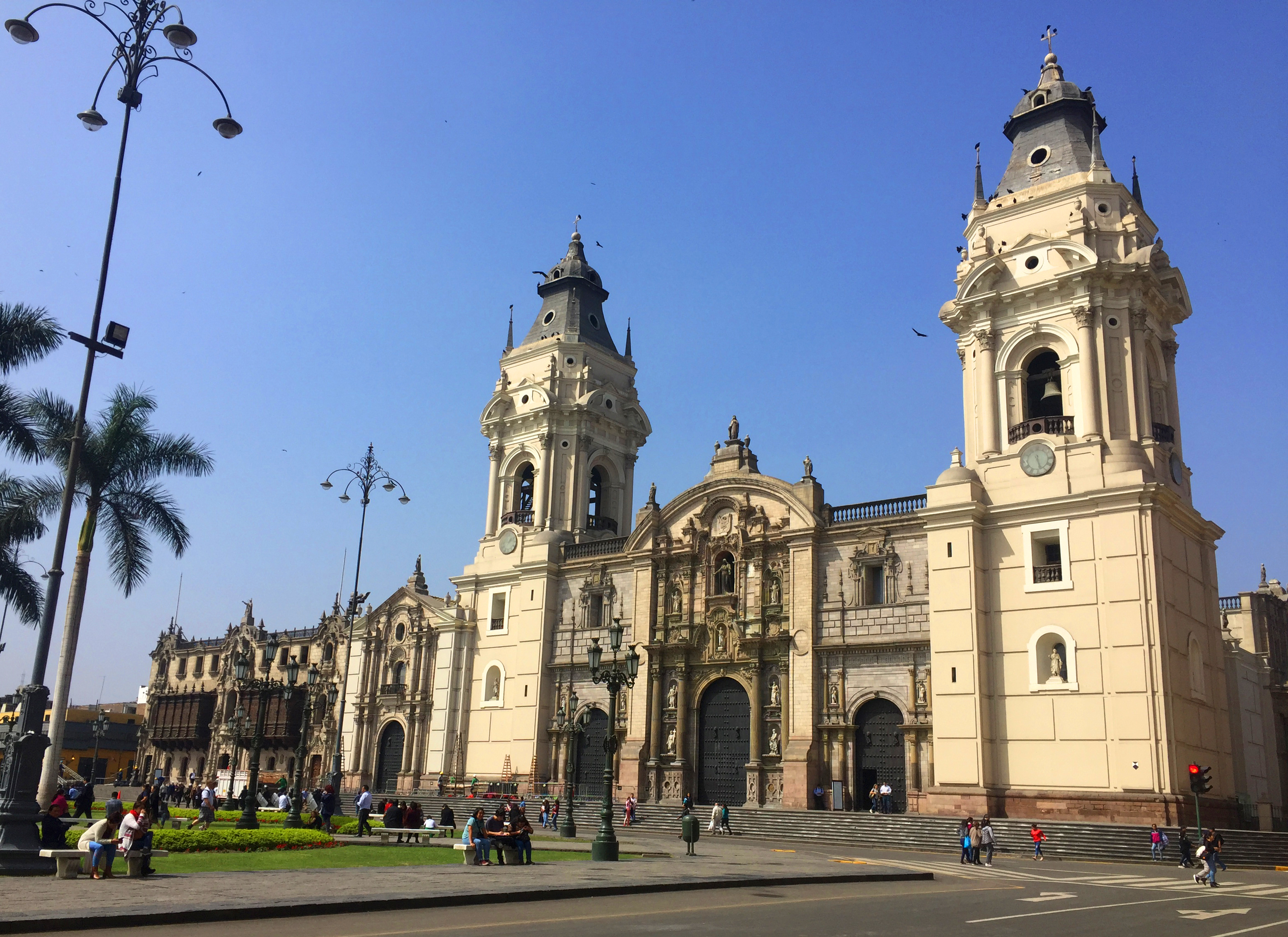
- View from the Plaza Mayor in 2022
- Cathedral Basilica of Lima
- 12°02′49″S 77°01′47″W
- Location: Plaza Mayor, Lima
- Country: Peru
- Denomination: Roman Catholic
- Sui iuris church: Latin Church
- Website: Museum website

History
- Former name: Iglesia Metropolitana de los Reyes
- Dedication: John the Apostle
- Consecrated: March 11, 1540

Architecture
- Architect(s): Francisco Becerra, Juan Martínez de Arrona, Juan Rher, Matías Maestro
- Style: Renaissance, Gothic, Neoclassical, Baroque and Plateresque
- Groundbreaking: 1535
- Completed: 1797

Administration
- Archdiocese: Archdiocese of Lima

Clergy
- Archbishop: Carlos Castillo Mattasoglio
- Bishop(s): Juan Luis Cipriani Thorne, Bishop Emeritus

The Cathedral Basilica of Lima, (Note: Spanish: Basílica Catedral de Lima; originally known during the Spanish period as the Iglesia Metropolitana de los Reyes.) commonly known as the Metropolitan Cathedral of Lima, (Note: Spanish: Catedral Metropolitana de Lima; known alternatively as the Cathedral of Lima (Spanish: Catedral de Lima)) is a Roman Catholic cathedral in Lima, Peru. It is the seat of the Archdiocese of Lima. Its construction began in 1535 by Francisco Pizarro and was completed in 1797, having been built in its present form between 1602 and 1797. Its patron saint is Saint John, Apostle and Evangelist, to whom it is dedicated.

Located on the eastern limit of the Plaza Mayor, at the second block of the Jirón Carabaya, (Note: Traditionally known as the Calle Gradas de la Catedral prior to the adoption of a new urban nomenclature in 1862.) and is part of the Historic Centre of Lima. The Archbishop's Palace and Iglesia del Sagrario are located beside the cathedral. It is the oldest and largest church in Peru.

== History ==
The Cathedral of Lima was built on the site of the Inca shrine of the Puma Inti and the palace of the Cuscoan prince Sinchi Puma, a direct descendant of the Inca Sinchi Roca.

When Francisco Pizarro founded Lima, he assigned a plot of land to the church, making Sinchi Puma renounce his assets on paper certified by a notary, so that the occupation of the site chosen for the church would not mean usurpation of ownership.

In 1535, Pizarro laid the first stone and carried, in a public demonstration of faith and humility, the first wood for the construction of the church (first cathedral), which was built under the patronage of Our Lady of the Assumption, finishing the construction in 1538 and inaugurated on 11 March 1540, placing the Blessed Sacrament for the first time that day.

After the disputes between Diego de Almagro and Pizarro, and after having established the Viceroyalty of Peru, Pope Paul III, taking into account the growth of the city of Lima, issued a bull on 14 May 1541 creating the Diocese of Lima and raising the small church to the category of cathedral which began to be built in 1542 during the government of Cristóbal Vaca de Castro. Francisca Pizarro Yupanqui, daughter of the founder of Lima, contributed the considerable sum of five thousand golden pesos for the construction of the new cathedral, which came to cost fifteen thousand golden pesos, thanking the King of Spain through a real cédula of 19 March 1552.

On 8 October 1549, the Cabildo of Lima discussed that it would be convenient for the cathedral to have a clock and decreed that one be purchased that had been brought from Spain at the time.

With the changes introduced by the peacemaker Pedro de la Gasca to give it greater distinction, the new church (second cathedral) begun by Cristóbal Vaca de Castro was inaugurated in 1552 by Archbishop Jerónimo de Loayza. This was a small building – 9 x 19 m – very modest and narrow, and for its foundations reddish stone was brought from a quarry in Lunahuaná. The new cathedral later had Saint John the Evangelist as its patron saint.

=== Reconstruction efforts ===
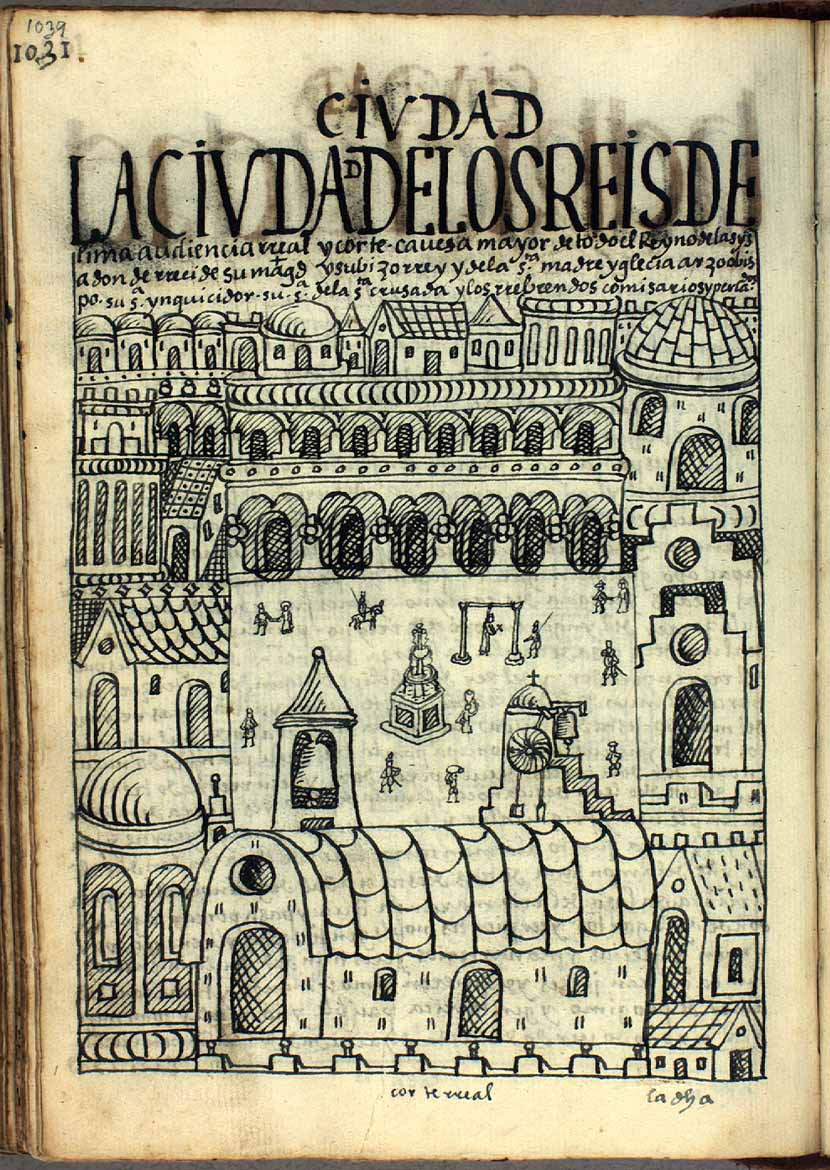
1615 painting by Guamán Poma of the cathedral (foreground).

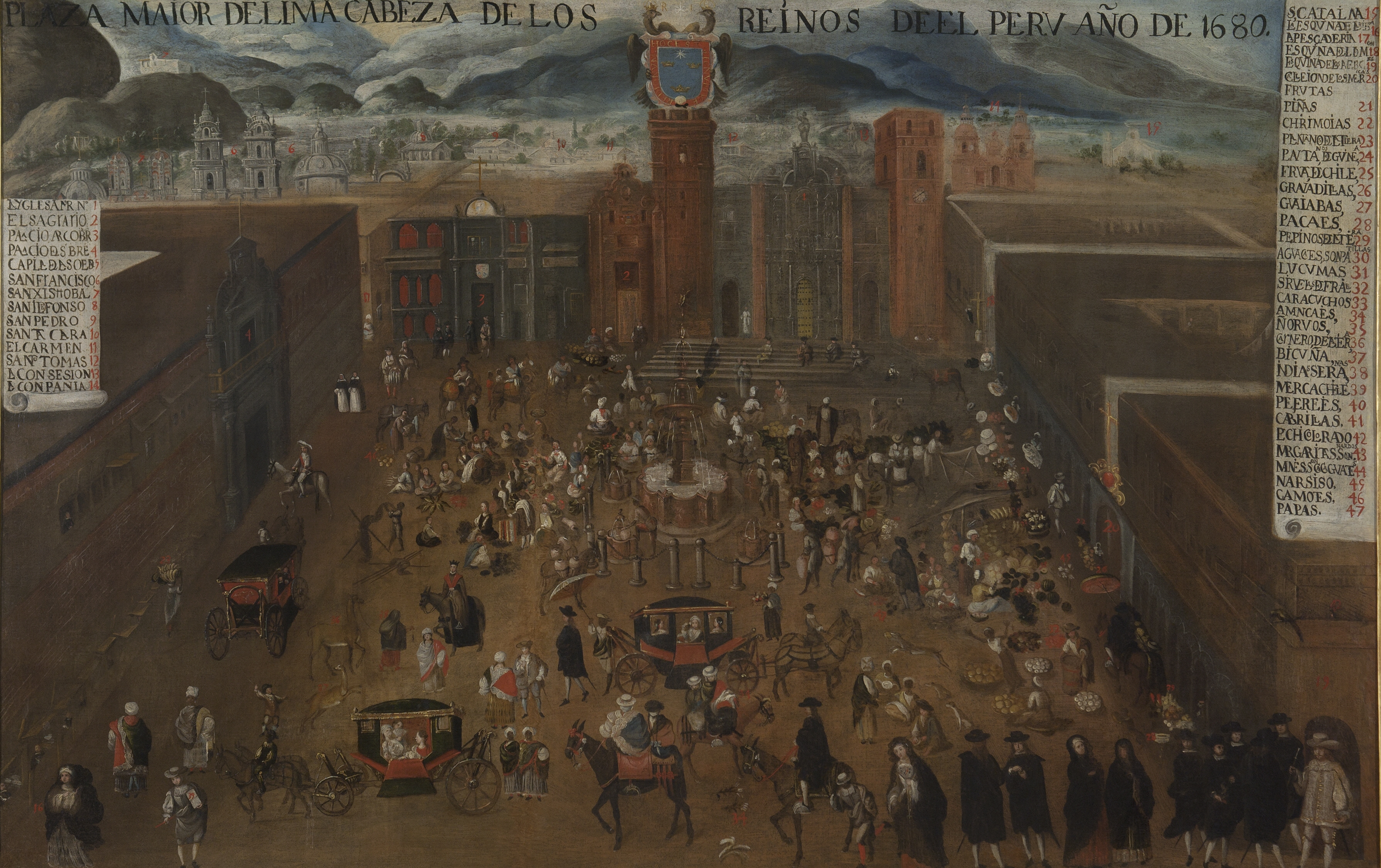
1680 painting of the unfinished cathedral and the Plaza Mayor.

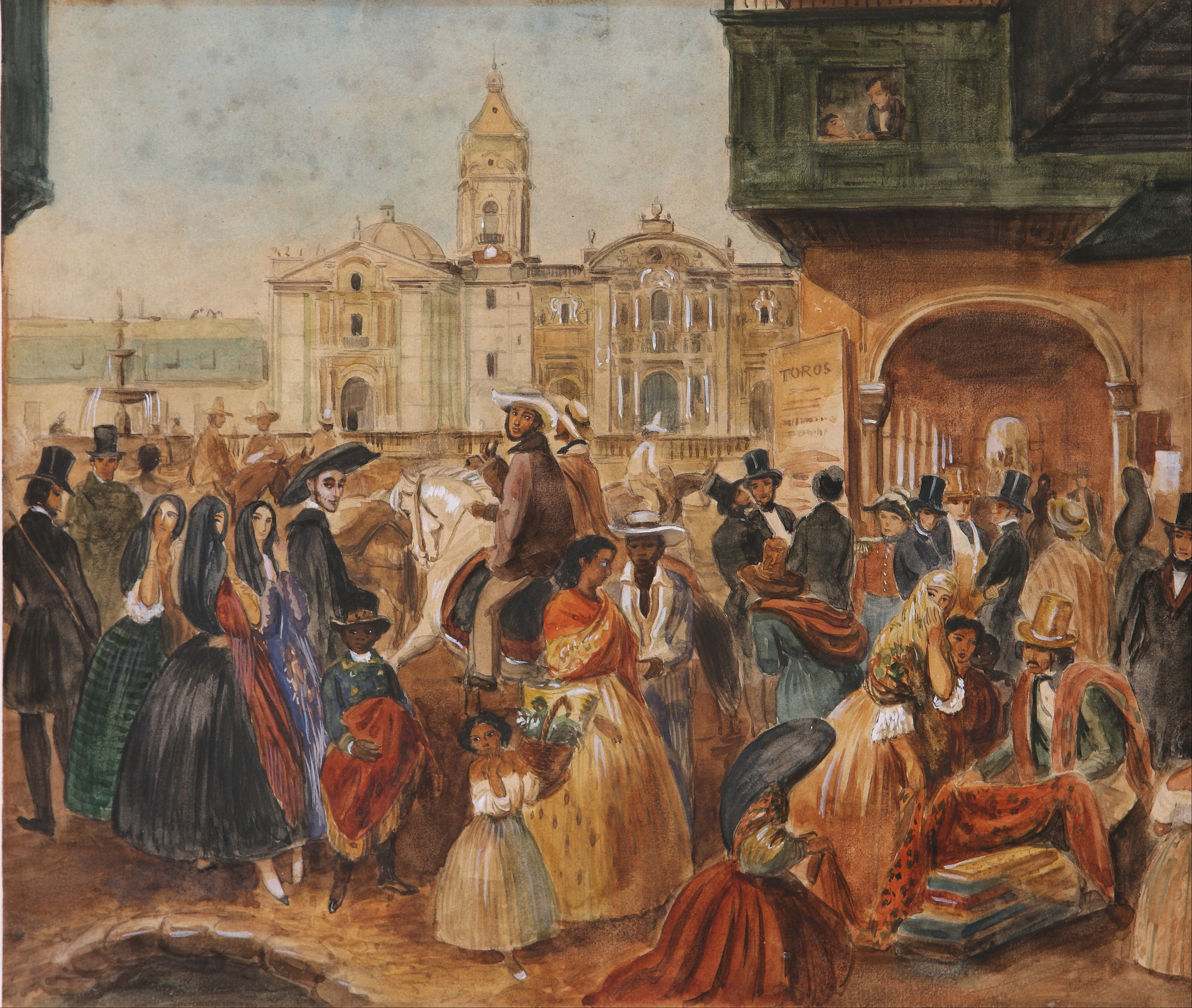
Lima’s Main Square in 1843 by Johann Moritz Rugendas. Lima Art Museum.

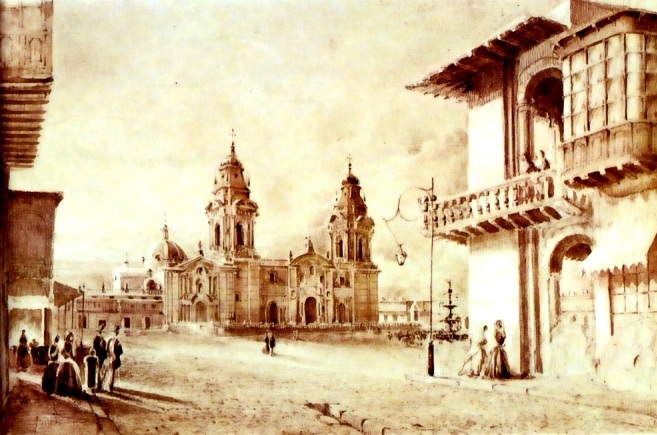
The Cathedral and the Plaza Mayor in 1850.

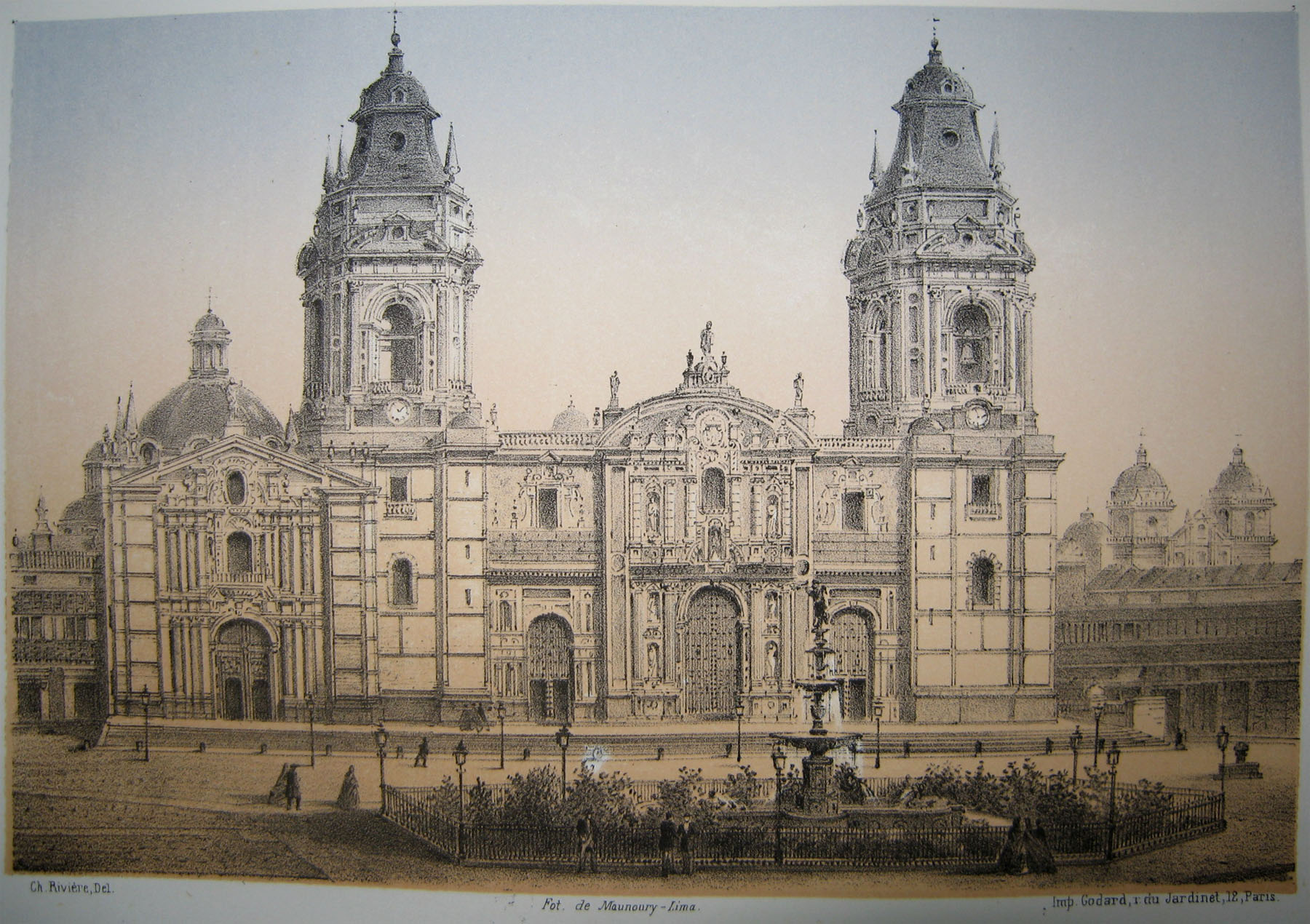
The Cathedral of Lima and the Renaissance fountain at the Plaza Mayor in 1860 by Henri Godard and Jardinet.

Later, when the city of Lima became an Archbishopric, the construction of a new cathedral was considered in accordance with the rise in status of the episcopate of Lima, as well as with its population growth. In 1564 Archbishop Jerónimo de Loayza decided on a sumptuous building to rival the most famous cathedrals in Spain (such as Seville Cathedral then, and now the largest in Spain), thus beginning a change in dimensions. The work began with the demolition of the primitive adobe walls, but the new construction would not be completed.

Master builder Alonso Gonzales Beltrán was given the task, in 1564, of designing a large church with three naves and side chapels. But his project, inspired by the Seville Cathedral, turned out to be too grandiose and costly.

When Viceroy Martín Enríquez de Almanza arrived, in 1581, being Archbishop of Lima Toribio de Mogrovejo, arranged for a new cathedral to be built and in 1585 the Trujilloan architect Francisco Becerra, who had made plans for several buildings in Mexico and Quito, was called from Cusco, where, at the time, he was working, and was in charge of the construction of the third cathedral. Becerra made a new plan (considered to be the plan on which the existing cathedral is based) that took, in part, the cathedrals of Jaén and Seville as models. The first had three naves, like the one in Lima, the second had five, but there are doors in the arms of the crossing, three doors in the main façade and a side courtyard called, as in the Cathedral of Lima, the Patio de los Naranjos, which is reached through the side door that is to the left. The definitive layout of the cathedral, made by Becerra, resulted in a Renaissance-style church, with a wide floor plan and 3 large naves and two side chapels.

The Cathedral of Lima is a temple with three naves with two more chapels and a flat closing wall. (...) The three naves are of the same height, as in the one in Jaén. This last one was the immediate precedent of the two Peruvian cathedrals.

— Taken from El Arte Hispanoamericano (1988).

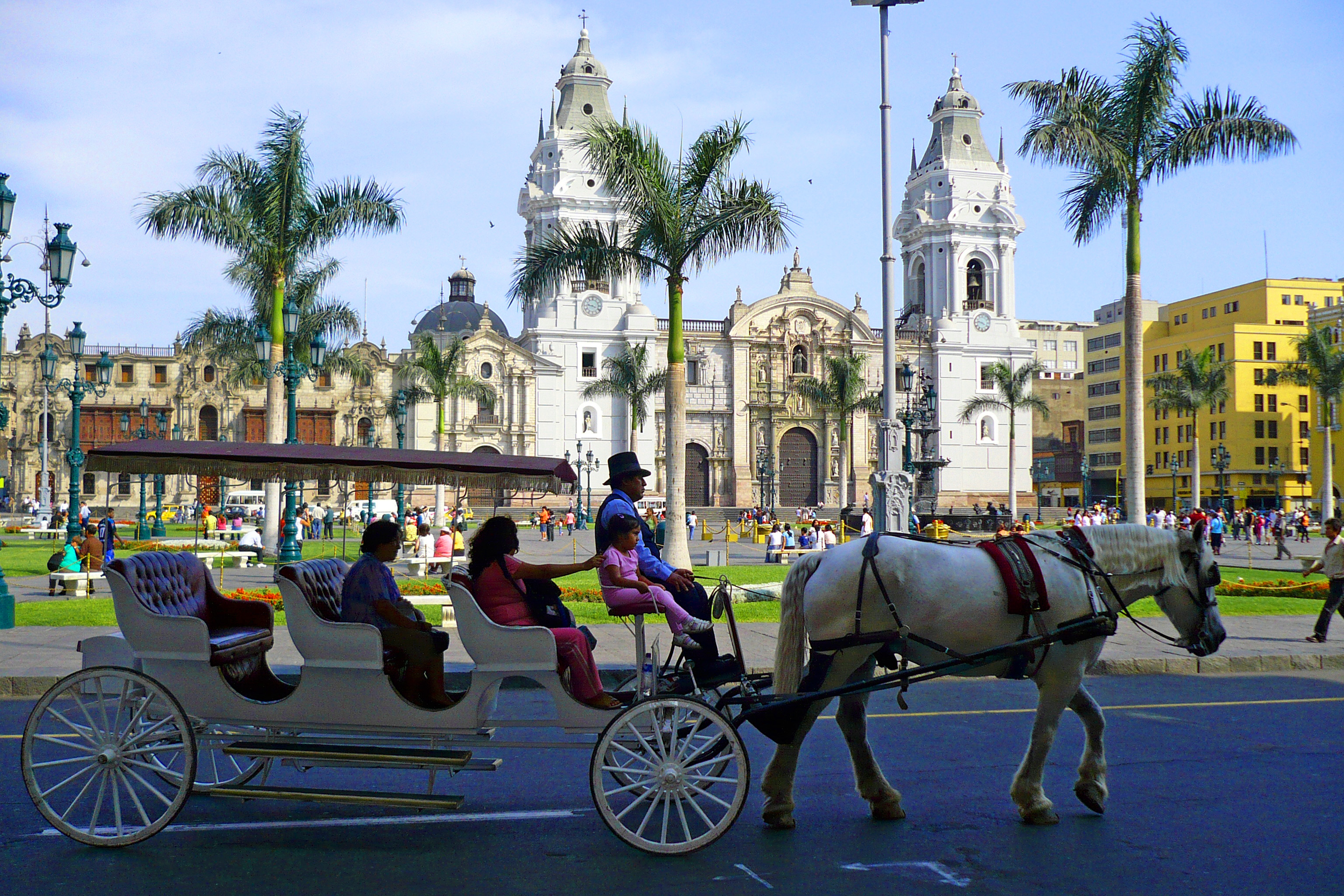
View from the Plaza Mayor

In 1602, the church was still "an old shack-type, covered with straw with much indecency" according to a letter that Philip III of Spain sent to Archbishop Toribio de Mogrovejo in which he urged him to hurry up with the construction work.

In 1604 the first part of the third cathedral was inaugurated. When Becerra died in 1605, only half of the church was built.

The final plan was designed immediately after the 1606 earthquake, although another in 1609 threatened to destroy the entire building, damaging the vaults of the built part. Discussions were held on the best means of defense against seismic movements: the Chief Architect, Juan Martínez de Arrona, supported the idea of brick vaults, but several members of the Cabildo or Municipal Council considered that it would be better to cover the cathedral with wood. Tired of the need to find a solution to the problem, they appointed Bartolomé Lorenzo as Advisor to Arrona. Finally, in October 1625, the naves of the main part of the third cathedral were consecrated. The main entrance (designed by Arrona) was completed in 1632, and the towers in 1649. The 1687 earthquake caused much damage to the cathedral, and despite all the precautions taken in construction, the 1746 earthquake damaged the structure again and almost reduced it to ruins, requiring a new reconstruction, the Viceroy José Antonio Manso de Velasco ruled at the time, who ordered a new cathedral to be built in the same place in 1758. The existing building is a reconstruction, which, by order of the Viceroy José Antonio Manso de Velasco, undertook -following the old plans- the Jesuit Juan Rher (born in Prague).

Rher took full advantage of the use of wood and quincha in the ribbed vaults, rebuilt the Renaissance stone doorway and advanced the work quite a bit, leaving the bell towers unfinished for a long time.

The reconstruction was carried out in three parts, the first culminated in 1755, the second in 1758 and the last in 1778. Between the years 1794 and 1797 the current bell towers of the cathedral, which remained unfinished, were rebuilt being finished by the Presbyter Matías Maestro.

In the left tower is the bell called "la Cantabria", which weighs 300 quintals and was cast in Lima. On the right "la Purísima", of 150 quintals, and "la Vieja", of 55 quintals.

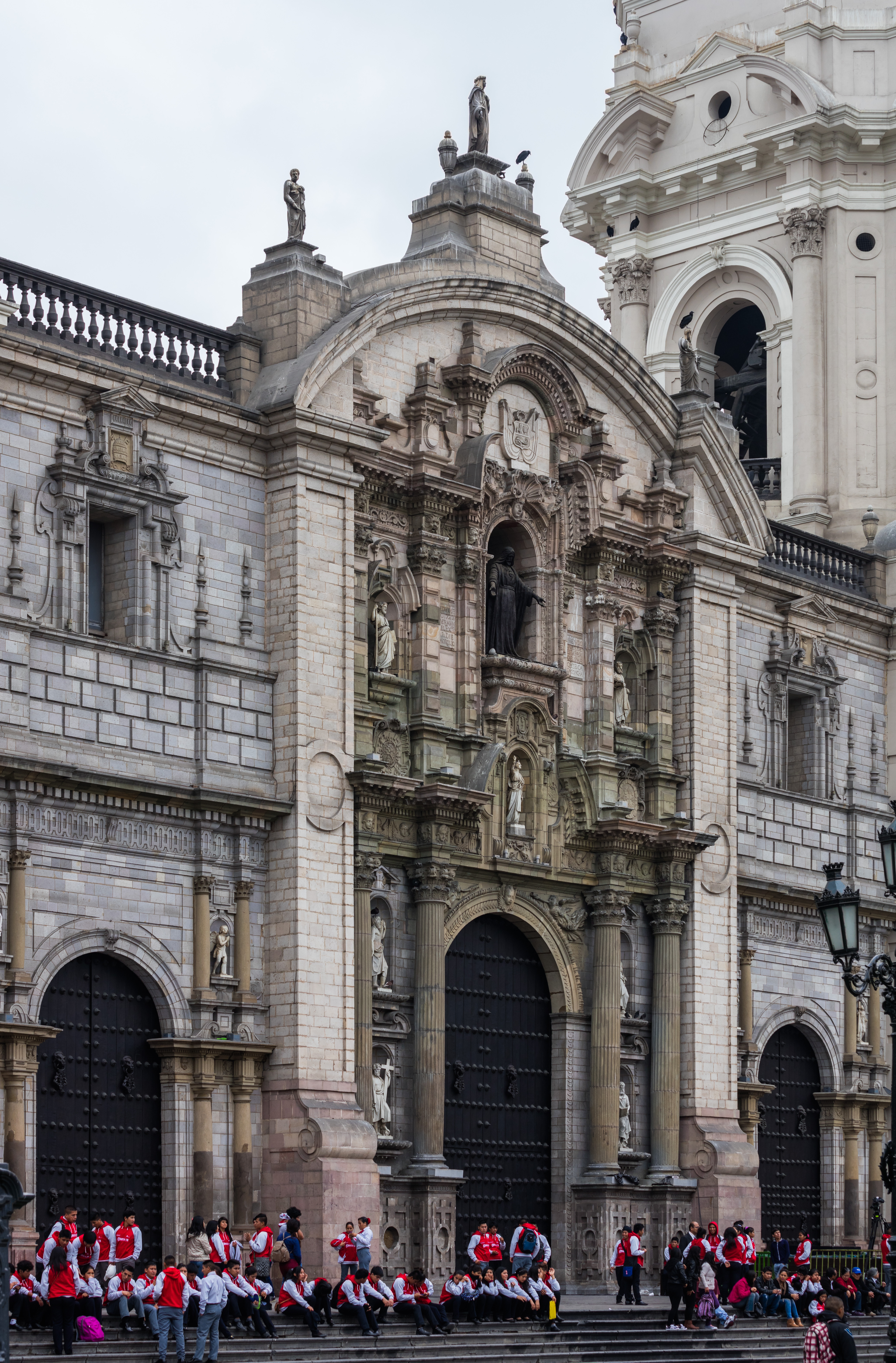
Main Renaissance-style portal with the corinthian capitals of the columns. The niches feature sculptures of the apostles, which surround that of Jesus. Medallions, heads, angels and other Plateresque ornaments can also be seen.

In its interior aspect as in the exterior, the first church of Peru, which holds the title of Metropolitan Basilica, has undergone many notable changes. Baroque, Gothic and Neoclassical elements have been mixed in this way. A substantial change was the transfer of the choir to the presbytery as well as the removal of most of the Baroque altars and ornaments that it originally had for the early-19th century Renaissance ones. These transformations began in 1804, in accordance with the neoclassical currents prevailing at the time. In 1891, the supposed remains of the founder of Lima (Francisco Pizarro) were moved to the cathedral and placed in the Chapel of la adoración de los Reyes, the third on the left hand side, where they rested until the mausoleum was built in which, currently, The authentic remains found in 1977 are preserved.

On 28 May 1921, recognition was conferred as a minor Basilica under the name of Catedral Basílica San Juan Apóstol y Evangelista.

The earthquake of 1940 caused damage to the cathedral and for this reason a restoration work was undertaken whose direction was entrusted to Emilio Harth Terré.

=== Alleged treasure ===
A well known urban legend is that, in 1820, a vast amount treasure, which is known as the so-called Treasure of Lima, was hidden in the cathedral by the citizens of Lima. According to the legend, subsequently, to save it from José de San Martín's revolutionary armies, it was placed on a British vessel, which was anchored in the harbor; however, the ship's captain killed the guards and fled to Cocos Island, where he buried the treasure. Allegedly, years later, treasure hunters still tried to find legendary lost treasure of Lima. Underscoring this legend are several facts:

1. In 1855, a New York newspaper printed an 1854 letter from San Francisco, California, which recounted that there was going to be a treasure expedition to Cocos Island based on a near-deathbed confession. Only, in this account, the treasure did not come from Lima but was said to be from a Spanish gallon that had been captured in 1816 by pirates and buried on Cocos Island.
2. August Gissler, who lived on Cocos Island from 1889 to 1908, also had an unsuccessfully quest for treasure: in over twenty years, he never found more than six gold coins despite diligently searching.
3. By 1929, a version of the so-called Cathedral of Lima/Treasure of Lima Legend was printed in an American newspaper.

=== Recent history ===
Since 1991, the cathedral has been included as a UNESCO World Heritage Site as part of the Historic Center of Lima.

In recent years, under the pastoral care of Cardinal Juan Luis Cipriani Thorne and with the support of private companies, numerous and meticulous restoration works have been carried out on the cathedral and its works of art, as well as the improvement of its illumination, culminating the works in 2004, year of the 400th anniversary of the inauguration of the first built part of the third Cathedral.

In 2005, to enhance the appearance of the façade night, new exterior lighting was installed as part of the project called "Circuito Turístico de la Luz", which was carried out at the initiative of the mayor of Lima Luis Castañeda to improve the Historic Centre of Lima.

In addition to the Cathedral of Lima, the Government Palace and the Palacio Municipal de Lima were also considered within the group of buildings illuminated by the Municipality of Lima and the Grupo Endesa.

During the week, the cathedral offers tourists the religious site as a museum, which preserves notable artistic works from colonial times.

== Overview ==
=== Exterior ===
The façade of the Cathedral of Lima is in the Renaissance style with Plateresque decorations. Its tall towers with slate spires are Neoclassical with stylistic influences from El Escorial School and Northern Europe.

It has three doors, as in most cathedrals. The main one (the one in the center) is called Puerta del Perdón, the right side is called Puerta de la Epístola and the left side is called Puerta del Evangelio.

There are also two side doors, one that leads to the Calle de Judíos (right side) and another that leads to the Patio de los Naranjos (inner courtyard attached to the cathedral). In the back of the cathedral (Calle de Santa Apolonia) there are 2 other portals: Santa Apolonia and San Cristóbal.

On the main façade you can see statues of the Apostles, and in the central niche, the Sacred Heart of Jesus. Currently, in the upper part you can see the coat of arms of Peru, in the place where the coat of arms of the city of Lima was originally located together with the phrase Plus Ultra.

Next to the cathedral are the Church of the Sanctuary (one of the oldest in Lima) and the Archbishop's Palace, seat of the ecclesiastical government of Lima.

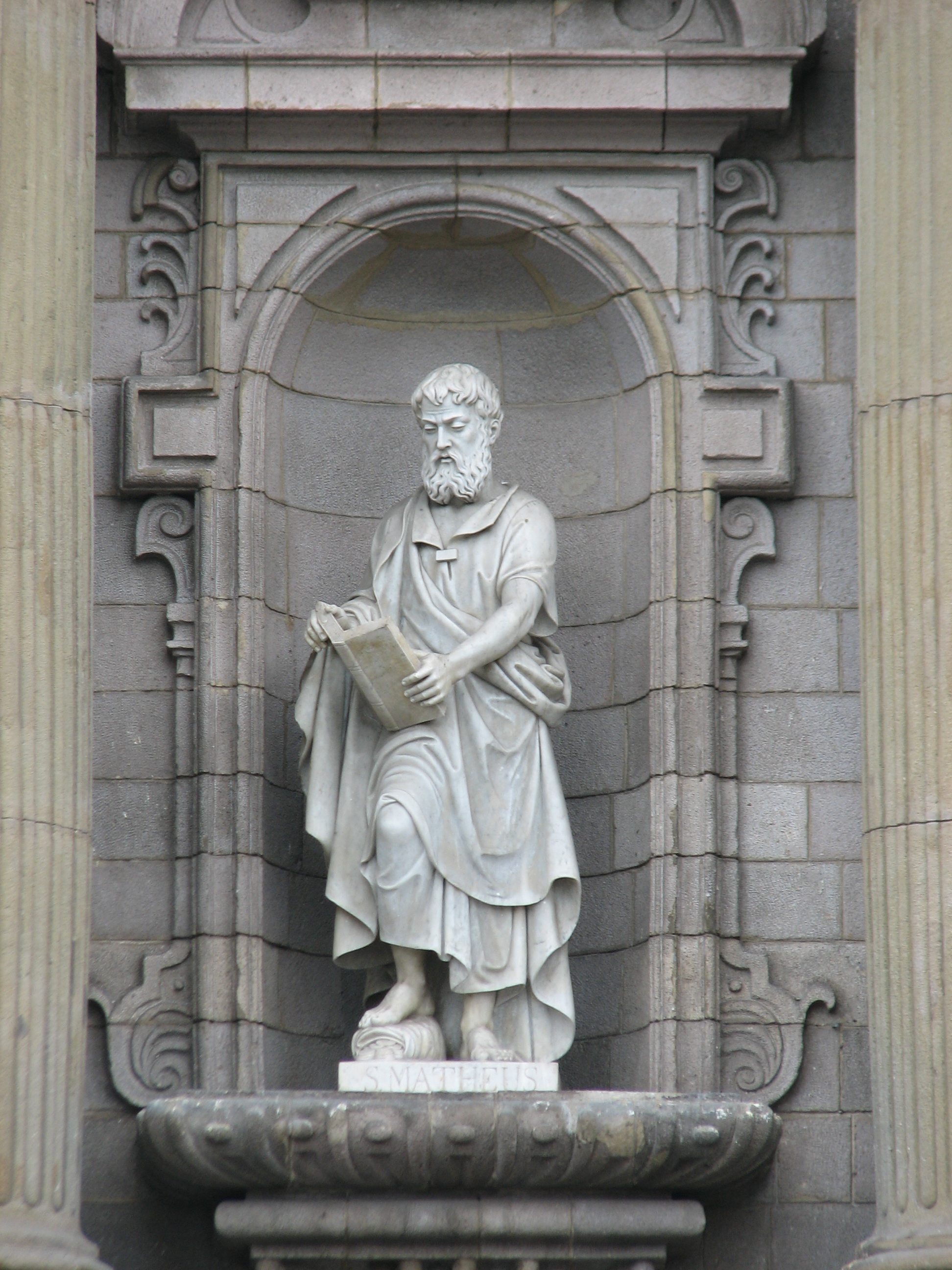
Sculpture of Saint Matthew on the main portal.

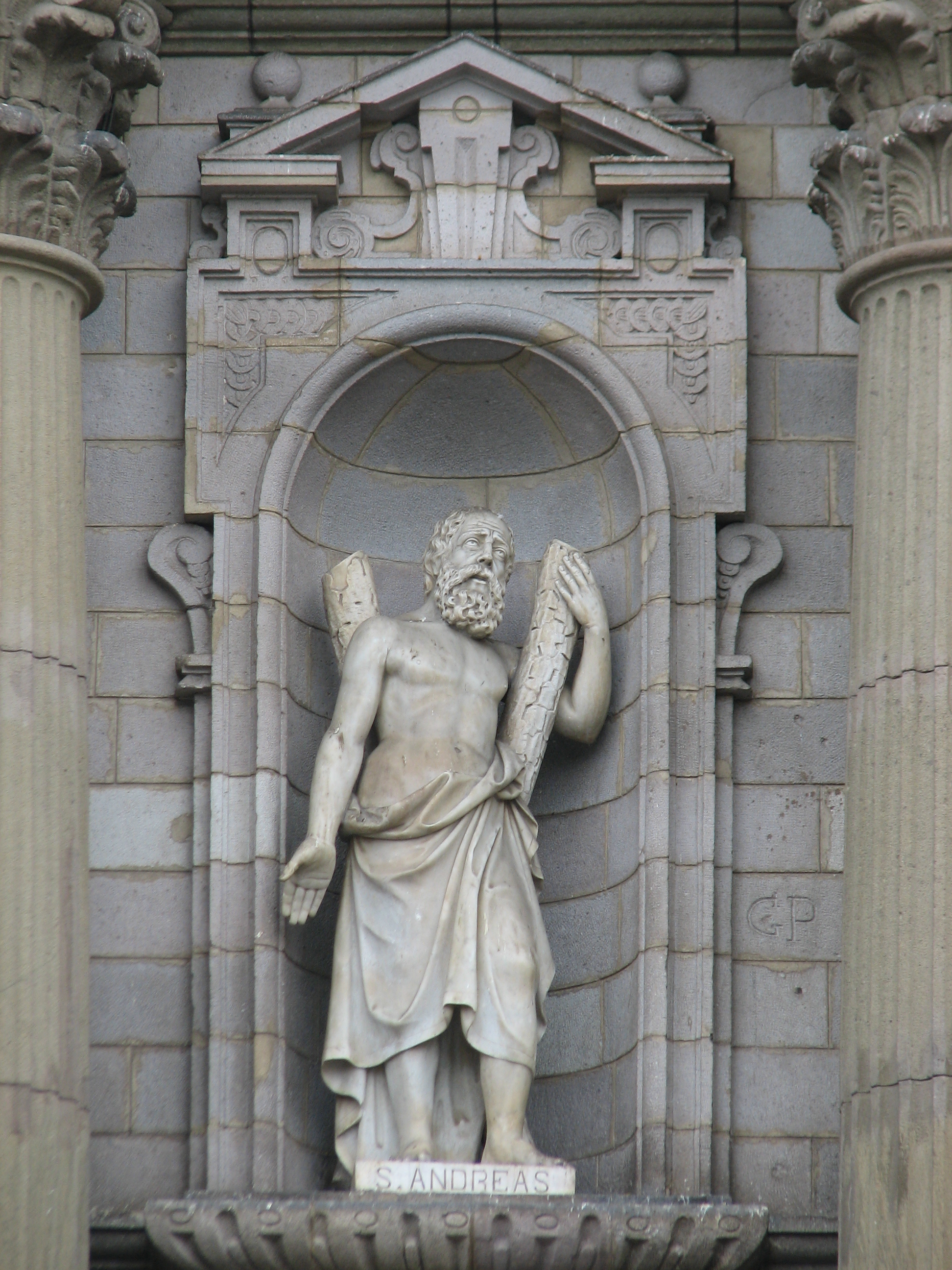
Sculpture of Saint Andrew on the main portal.

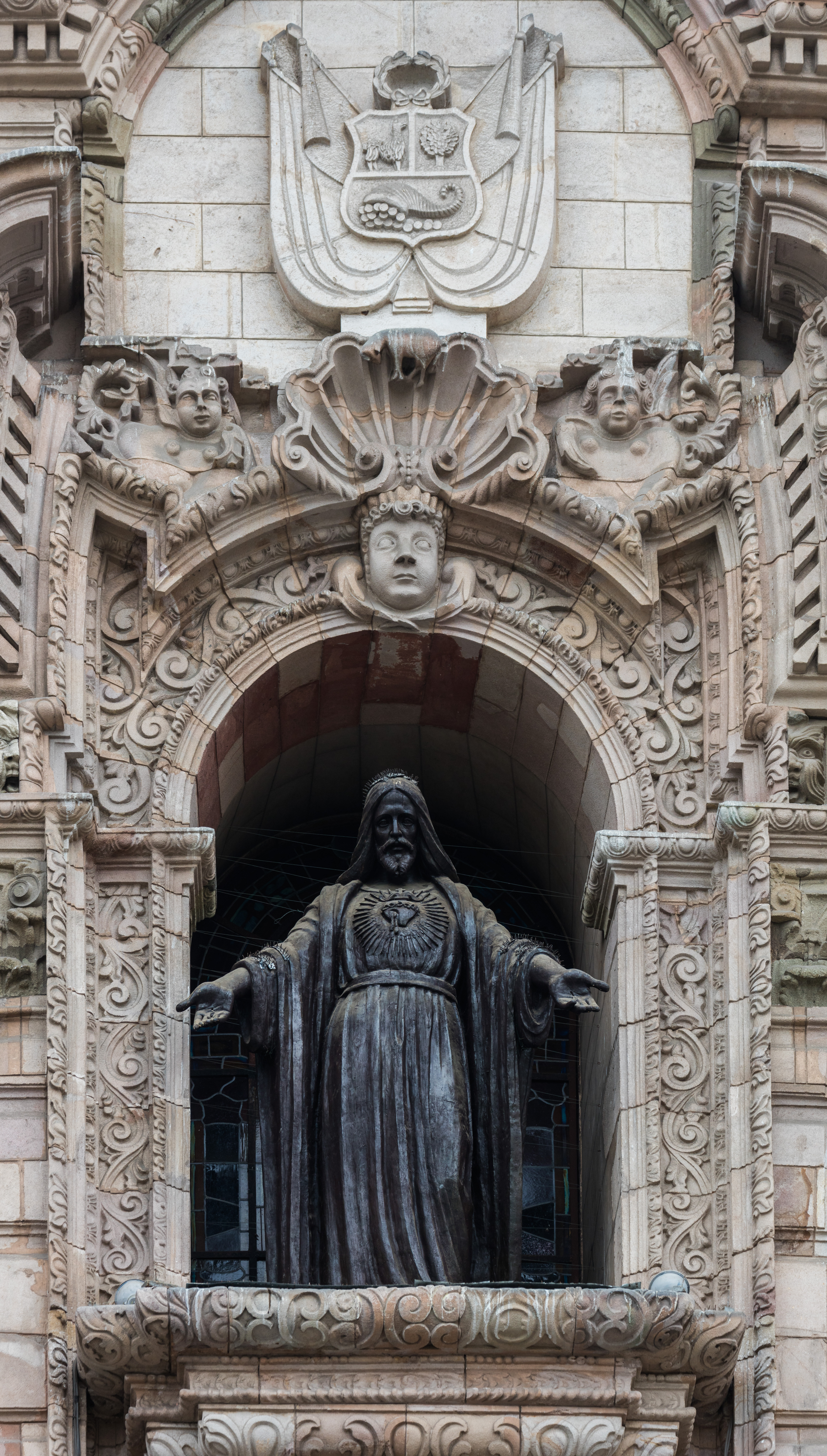
Sculpture of Jesus and colonial details.

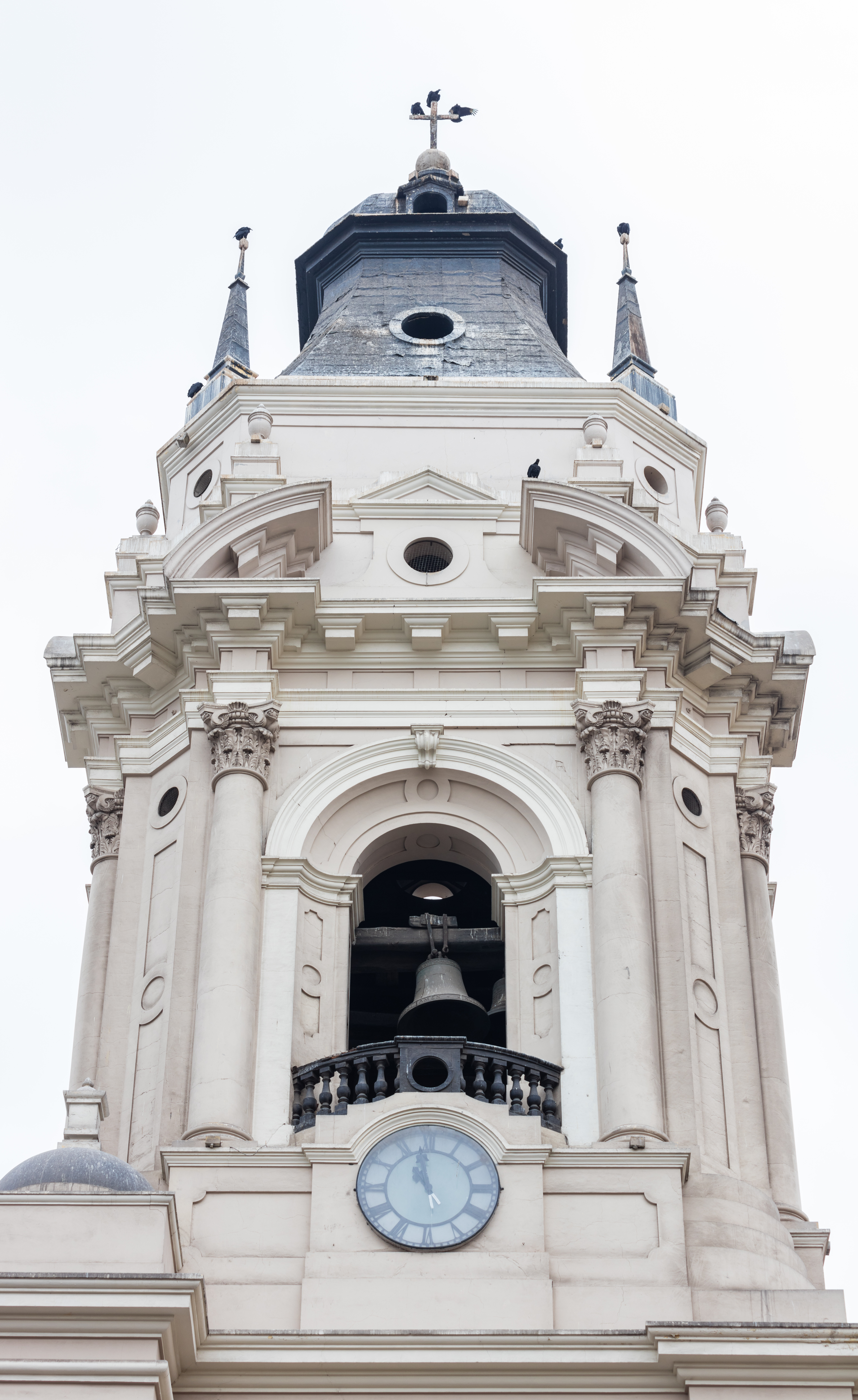
A bell tower.

=== Interior ===
The Cathedral of Lima shows several styles, from late Gothic, Renaissance to Baroque and Plateresque, due to the date of the start of construction, the architectural style is Renaissance. It has a rectangular hall plan, emulating the Cathedral of Seville. The ceiling is supported by Gothic ribbed vaults that recreate a starry sky, which are made of wood and stucco to relieve the weight on the walls and prevent them from collapsing in the event of an earthquake.

Originally its altars were Baroque in style, some of them being replaced by Neoclassical altars. The choir stalls, although presenting a Renaissance tradition, have an eclectic layout. In its chapels and sacristy it preserves works by the most famous sculptors of the colonial era in Peru.

The cathedral itself is a perfect synthesis of the architectural styles that were developed in the city of Lima from its origins to the present day.

==== Naves ====
The Cathedral of Lima has three naves and two additional naves where the side chapels open.

Along the side naves, large-format paintings of the Via Crucis can be seen. Pope John Paul II visited this site twice, in 1985 and 1988, which is commemorated on two plaques that can be seen at the entrance.

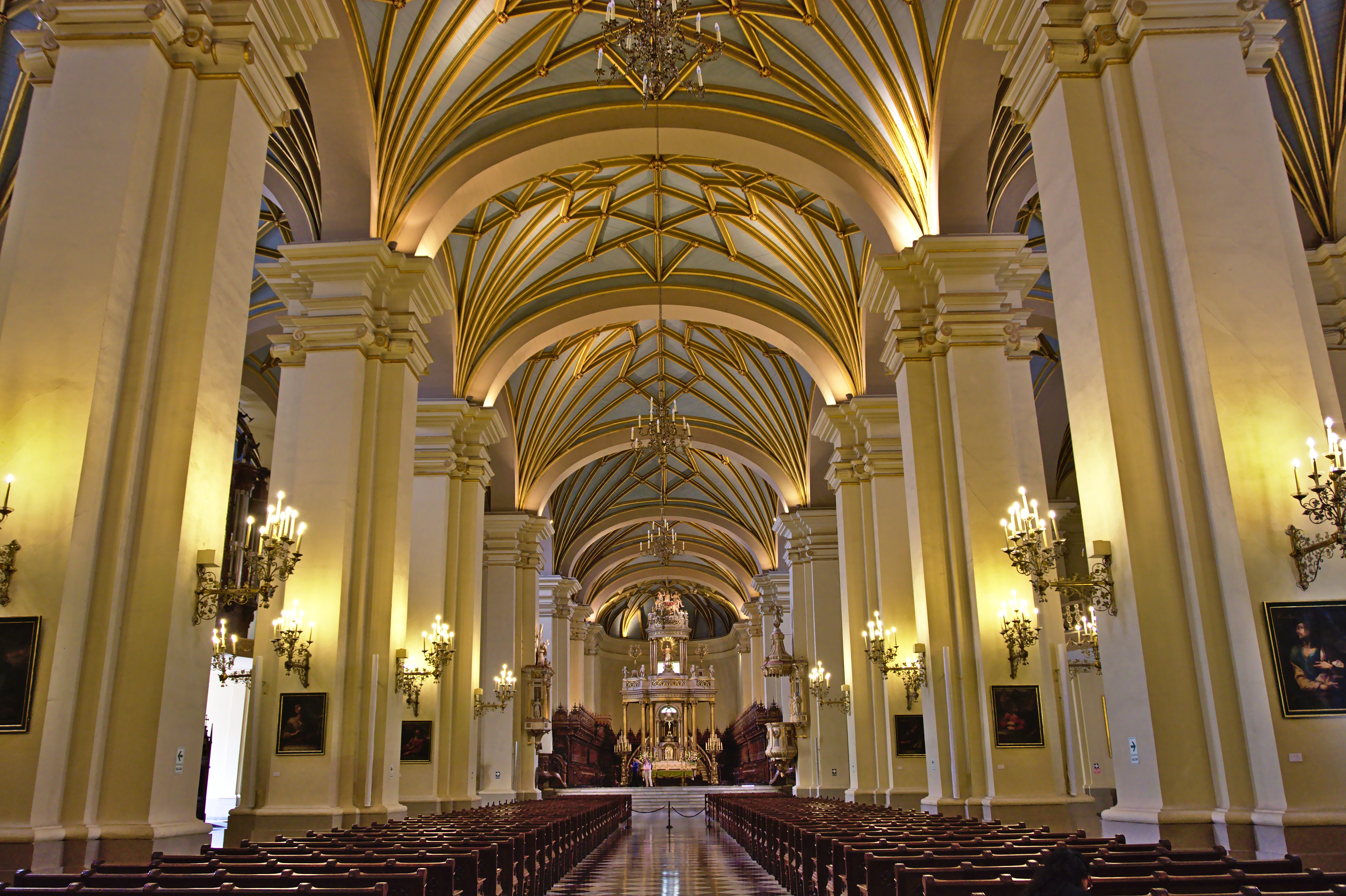
View of the central nave whose ceiling has Gothic ribs.

==== Chapels ====
- Chapel of Our Lady of the Expectation: it hosts the old baptistery, with its baptismal font. Preserved there is a sculpture of the Virgin Mary that forms part of the processional Marian group during local Holy Week celebrations, and that traditionally also presides over the cult of Lent. Recent restorations made it possible to discover the old polychromy that covered the chapel, which is now exposed.
- Chapel of the Holy Family: preserved here are ancient polychrome wood carvings of Jesus, Mary and Joseph. The walls feature two large oval paintings with the images of Saint Peter and Saint Paul, and four wooden panels that belonged to the old choir stalls. This had been the guild chapel of the city's carpenters' guild.

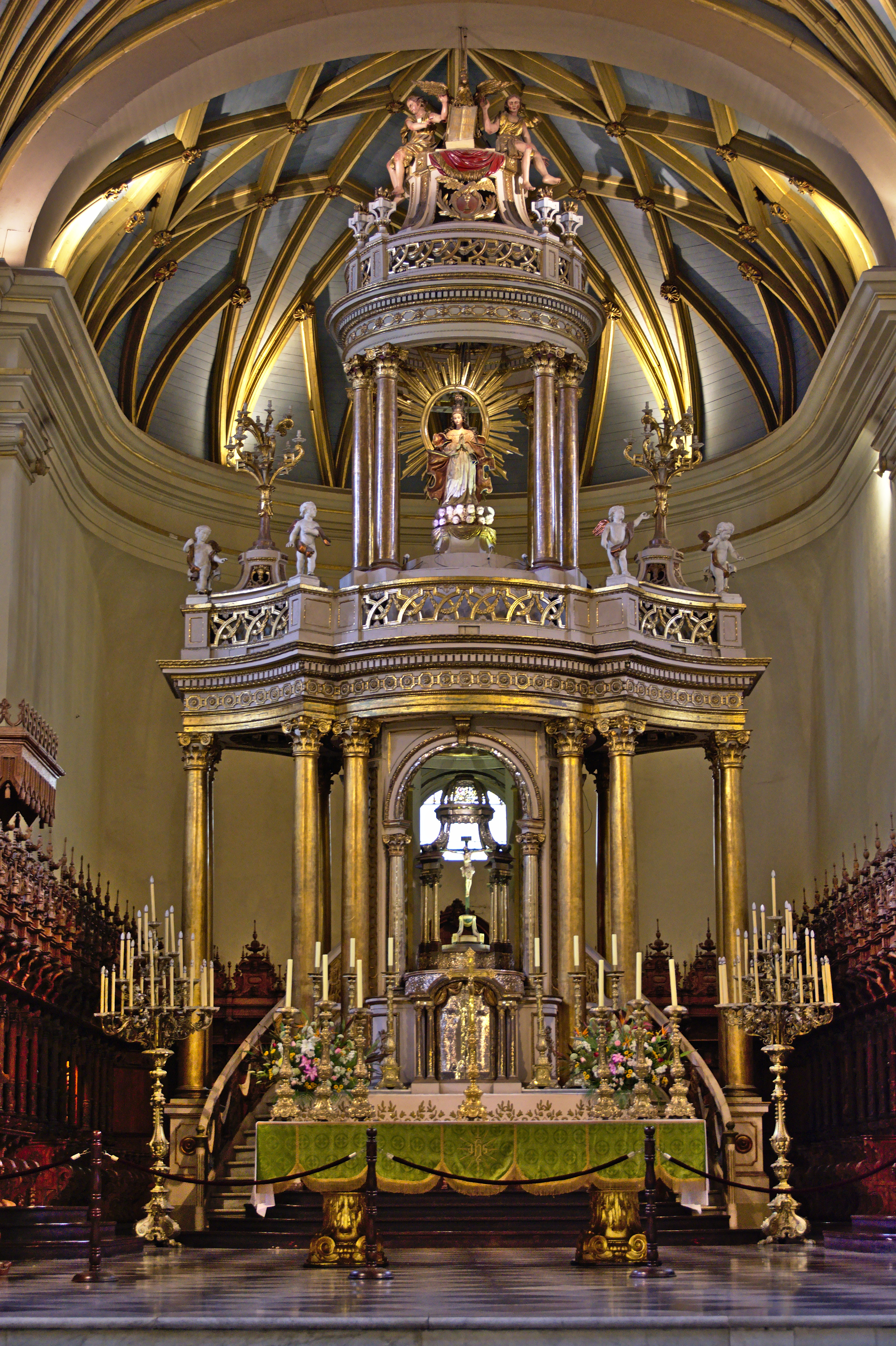
Altarpiece of the cathedral, made by Matías Maestro in 1799.

- Chapel of Our Lady of the Antique (Los Reyes): it currently receives the name of the Chapel of Our Lady of the Antique, as the one located in the retrochoir and that was under the patronage of the National University of San Marcos. In the past, students received their academic degrees there. The altarpiece housed in this chapel, in Neoclassical style made in 1799, is attributed to the Spaniard Matías Maestro and is presided over by an image of the Our Lady of the Antique (from the mid-16th century), Patron Saint of the university since 1627, is a true copy of the Virgin of Los Remedios of Seville, and two wooden statues stand out, of Saint Mark and Saint Thomas Aquinas, coming from the old Chapel of the university in the current Plaza Bolívar. The columns of the altarpiece are painted with different colors, each symbolizing the original faculties of the university.
- Chapel of Peruvian Saints: it is presided over by the image of Saint Rose of Lima, the first saint in the Americas, together with those of Saint Martin de Porres, Saint John Macias and Saint Francisco Solano, Peruvian saints. It was originally dedicated to Rose of Lima shortly after her canonization, and was initially located in the now defunct Church of Belén. In it is the tomb of Mons. Emilio Lissón, 27th Archbishop of Lima, currently in the process of beatification. Then, over the door that leads to the Patio de los Naranjos, the monumental pipe organ commissioned by the 20th Archbishop of Lima Francisco Xavier de Luna Pizarro, built in Belgium by the organ builder Hippolyte Loret (1810–1879), can be seen, disused for over 60 years.

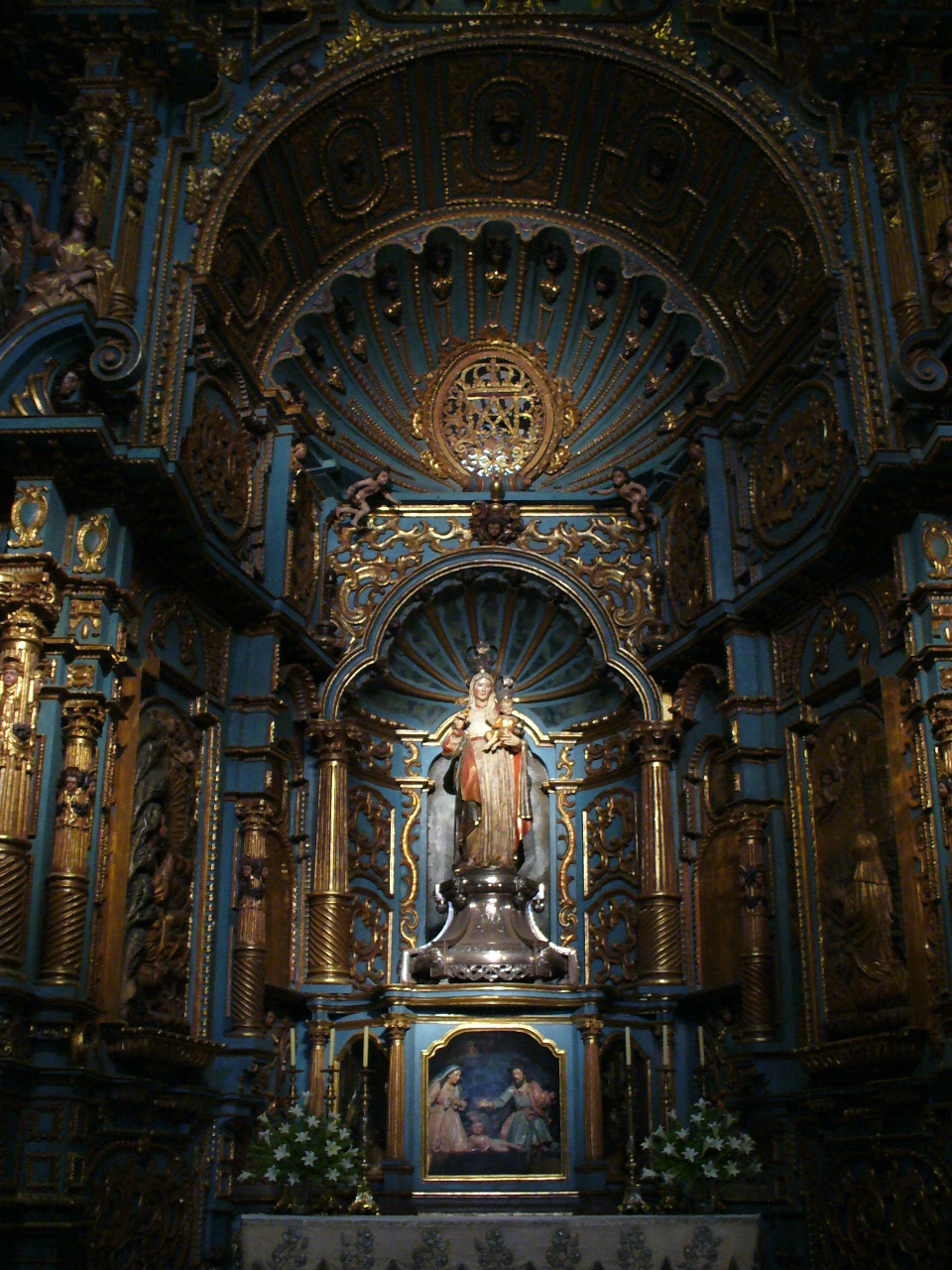
The primitive Baroque altar from the Chapel of la Immaculate Conception

- Chapel of the Immaculate Conception: it is one of the few chapels that retains its primitive Baroque altar, since many have Neoclassical altars, after the reforms made by the Presbyter Matías Maestro, who respected this one for its beauty. The altar is dominated by the image of Our Lady of Evangelization, a 16th-century wood carving sent by King Charles I. It is one of the first images of the Virgin to reach the New World. In her right hand, she holds the Golden Rose, a papal decoration conferred by John Paul II in 1988 on his second visit to Peru and which has very few Marian devotions. On the left wall of the chapel there is a large-format painting of Saint Josemaría Escrivá de Balaguer, founder of Opus Dei, made in 2005 for the 30th anniversary of his death and to commemorate the moment in which this saint visited this same chapel in 1974. The painting replaced the sepulcher altarpiece of Archbishop Diego Morcillo, located in that place for more than two centuries and which was relocated in another chapel of the cathedral. In the altarpiece there are also figures of a Nativity that according to tradition was the first in the city of Lima, commissioned by the daughter of Francisco Pizarro. The walls feature azulejos found after a restoration. At the entrance to the sacristy, a bas-relief of the Adoration of the Shepherds, from the 16th century—one of the oldest pieces in the cathedral—can be seen, which presided over the main altar of the first cathedral. On the right, a painting of Our Lady of Guadalupe. In addition, medallions of La Dolorosa and the Ecce Homo, and carvings of Saint Ambrose and Saint Augustine, can be seen.
- Chapel of Our Lady of Peace: this chapel is where the Blessed Sacrament is currently reserved. On the left wall there is a painting of Saint John the Evangelist, Patron Saint of the cathedral, giving Communion to the Virgin; and to the right is the tomb of the Servant of God Friar Francisco Camacho.
- Chapel of Saint John the Baptist: its altarpiece presents polychrome reliefs alluding to the life of the saint. It is dominated by a large crucifix, one of the oldest in the cathedral. Its altarpiece was made by the famous Sevillian sculptor Juan Martínez Montañés, and brought to the New World by ship for several years. It is considered among the best altarpieces of the cathedral building, although it originally belonged to the Church of the Concepction in Abancay Avenue.

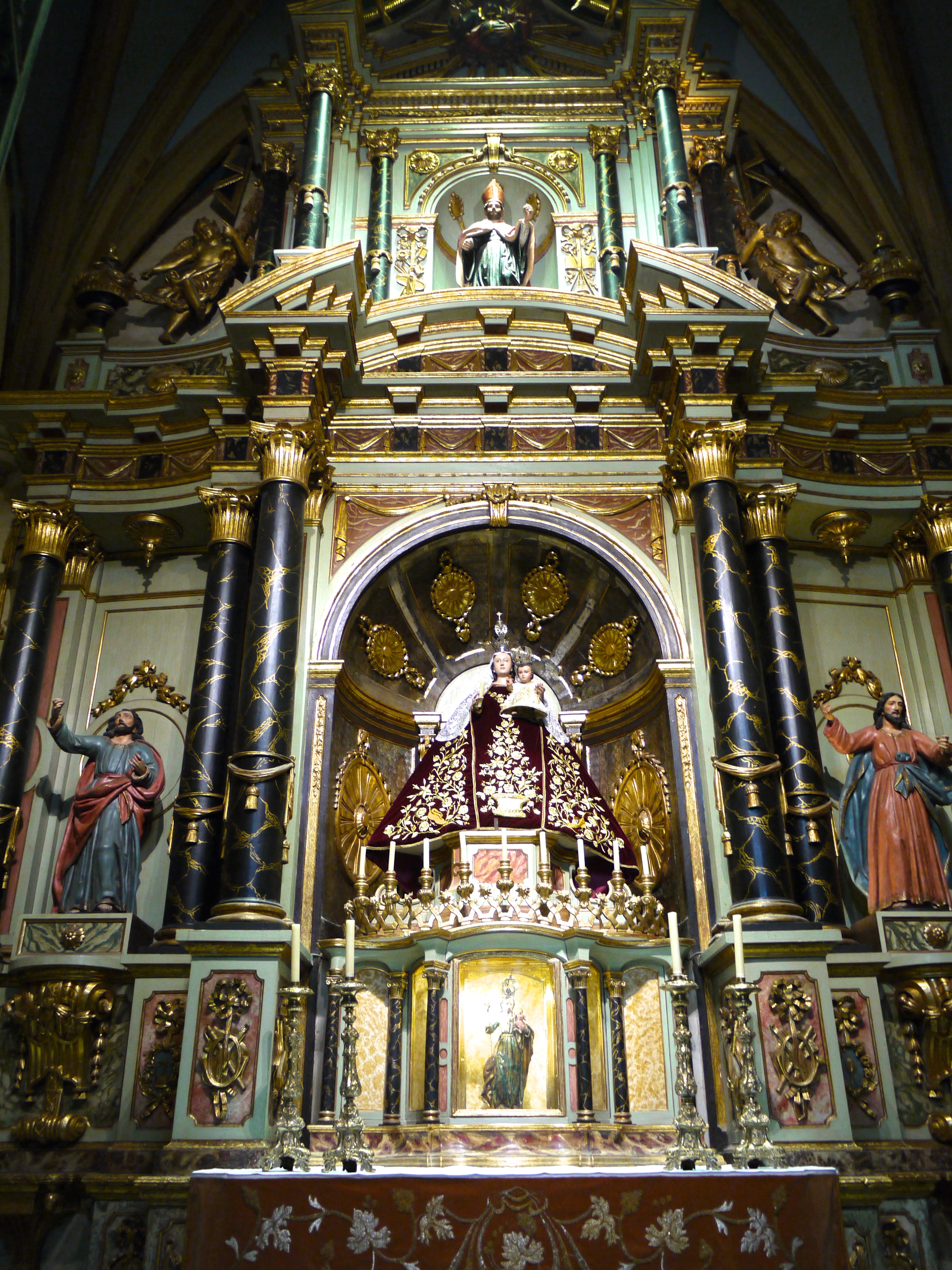
Altarpiece of the Chapel of the Virgen de la Candelaria made by Spaniard Matías Maestro

- Chapel of Our Lady of the Candle: its altarpiece is the work of Matías Maestro in his Baroque-Neoclassical transitional style.
- Chapel of Saint Turibius of Mogrovejo: it is dedicated to Mogrovejo, the second Archbishop of Lima and Patron of the Latin American episcopate, whose remains are preserved in the Cathedral (a reliquary with his relics can be seen on this altar). In this chapel other reliquaries with episcopal ornaments of the saint can be seen on the walls. On the left is the tomb of Cardinal Juan Landázuri Ricketts, 30th Archbishop of Lima, and on the right, a large painting that shows the episode of the theft of some hosts from the neighbouring Church of the Sanctuary (the hosts were miraculously found, it is said, in the neighboring Rímac District, where the Church of Santa Liberata currently stands, there is another painting that shows the moment of the discovery). Like the altarpiece of Saint Rose of Lima, it originally belonged to the now defunct Church de Belén. Above the side door is the gallery for the choir, with its organ.
- Chapel of Saint John the Evangelist: formerly the Chapel of Santa Ana, it houses the tomb of Nicolás de Ribera (the Elder), the first mayor of Lima, on its left wall. Its altarpiece is built in the Baroque-Neoclassical transitional style.
- Chapel of the Visitation: the group of the Visitation can be seen presiding over it. To the left is a Risen Christ who leaves in triumphal procession on Easter Sunday.
- Chapel of the Souls: it is the sepulcher chapel of the Archbishop of La Plata and Lima, and Viceroy of Peru, Friar Diego Morcillo Rubio de Auñón, originally dedicated to the Souls in Purgatory. The sepulcher altarpiece was originally located on one side of the Chapel of la Concepción, and bears the authentic image of that chapel, which in turn replaced the carving of Diego Morcillo, the same one that is exhibited separately in the same environment.
- Chapel of Saint Joseph: it is dedicated to Saint Joseph, with polychrome reliefs on the altarpiece alluding to his life. Some reliefs of the life of the Virgin are also exhibited in this area of the nave. The sculptural group of the Holy Family that presides over the altar is due to the sculptor Pedro Muñoz de Alvarado.

===== Defunct chapels =====
- Chapel of San Bartolomé: It was located behind the presbytery and separated from it by an ambulatory. The main altarpiece, of Tuscan order, consisted of three bodies and had as its main part a canvas of the martyrdom of Saint Bartholomew. In the same enclosure was the sepulcher altarpiece of the Archbishop of Lima, Bartolomé Lobo Guerrero, with three bodies in imitation marble. The sculpture of the Archbishop can still be appreciated as part of the tour of the Cathedral Museum.
- Chapel of Our Lady of the Antique: It was in the back room of the church. In its main altarpiece was originally the canvas of Our Lady of la Antigua, now in the chapel of the Kings. A text from the 17th century describes the original Baroque altarpiece, mentioning the existence of twelve Solomonic columns and thirty paintings of the Virgin, in addition to the canvas that is the title of the altarpiece. The chapel disappeared with the reforms undertaken at the end of the 19th century, together with four other auxiliary chapels of the first one, which were located on the sides of the choir.

==== Choir stalls ====
The impressive choir stalls, currently flanking the main altar, was designed by the Spaniard Martín Alonso de Mesa and made by the Catalan Pedro de Noguera in the 17th century. In the backs we see figures of numerous male saints and female saints (Apostles, Doctors, Popes, Bishops, virgins, etc.), Formerly the choir was located in front of the main altar (a position similar to that of the Cathedral of Mexico City). On the back of the Cathedra (which is located in the left stalls, under a canopy) is the figure of the Redeemer. The main altarpiece, in Neoclassical style, is presided over by an Immaculate Conception. Under the presbytery is the crypt of the Archbishops, where the remains of almost all the archbishops of this city are found, from Jerónimo de Loayza (the first) to Cardinal Augusto Vargas Alzamora, the last to die.

The Neoclassical pulpit is crowned by an image of Saint John the Evangelist, and the crucifix that remains in front, by a Paschal Lamb. In the transept of the nave, we see 4 statues (2 on each side) of Saint John the Evangelist, Saint Peter, Saint Paul and Saint James the Greater. It is the work of the Spanish builder Matías Maestro, who led the renovation of the old Liman Baroque altars, replacing them with Neoclassical altars.

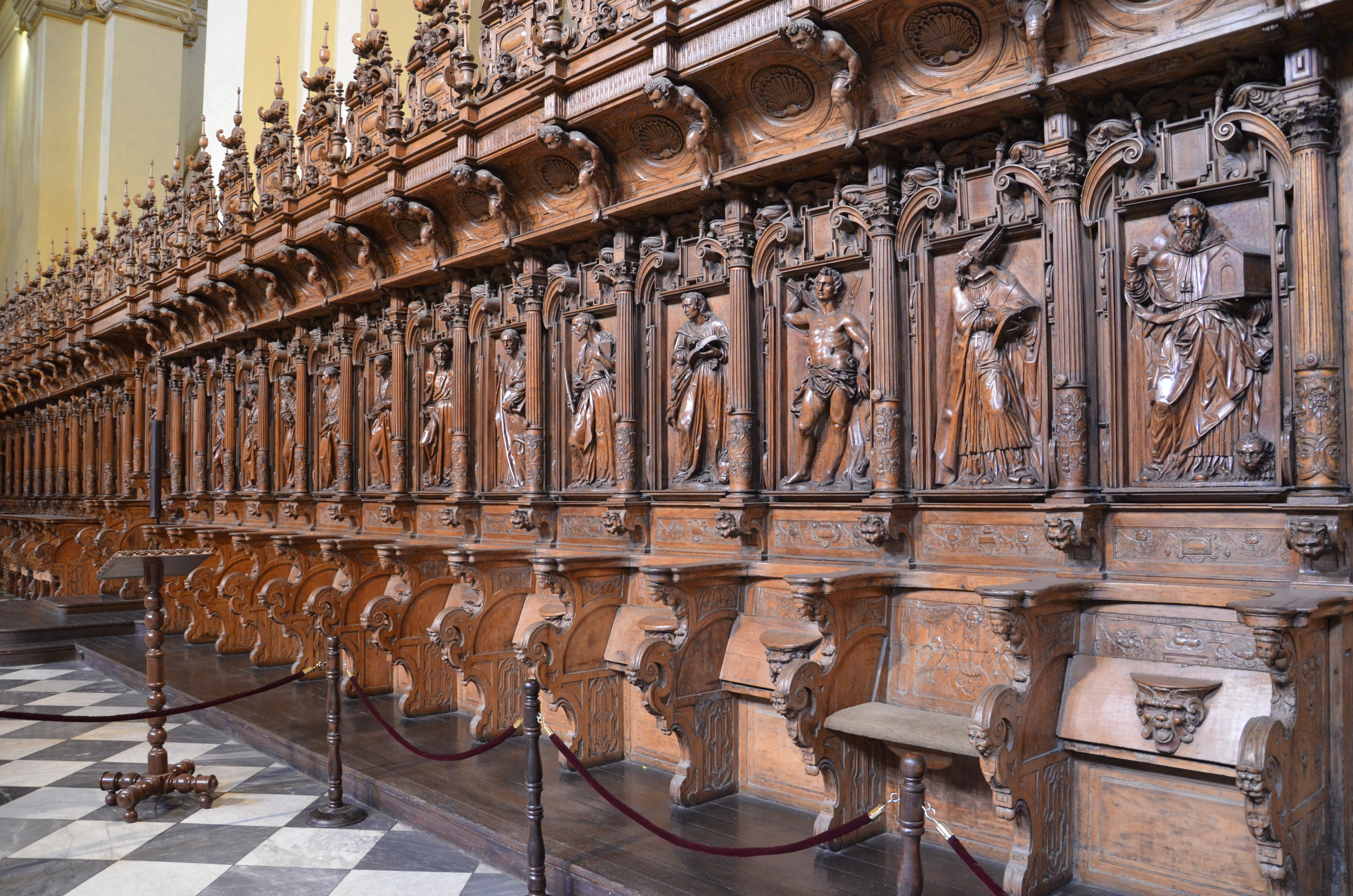
Cathedral choir stalls.

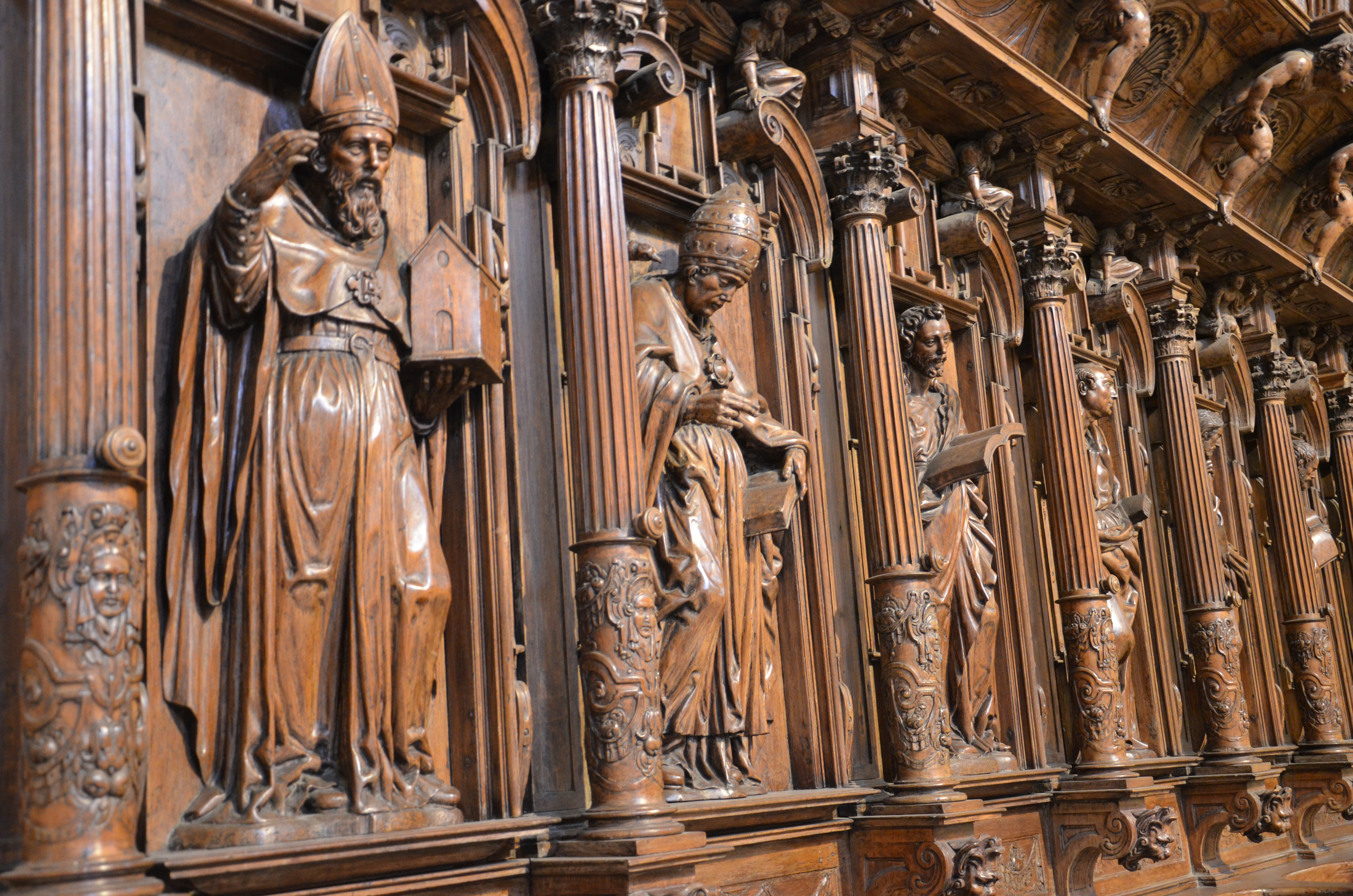
Male saints and female saints of the choir stalls.

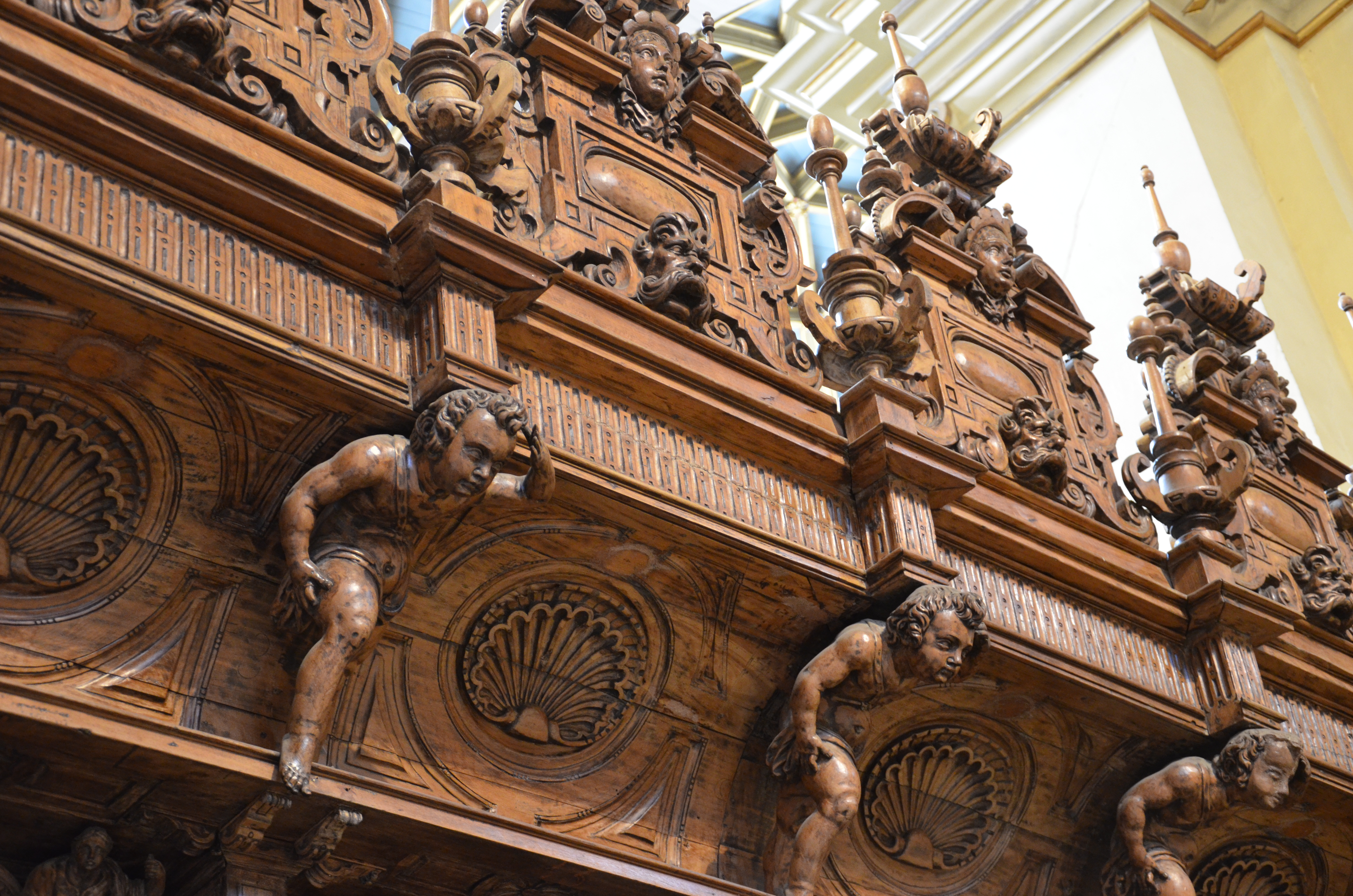
Upper detail of the choir stalls

==== Crypt of Francisco Pizarro ====
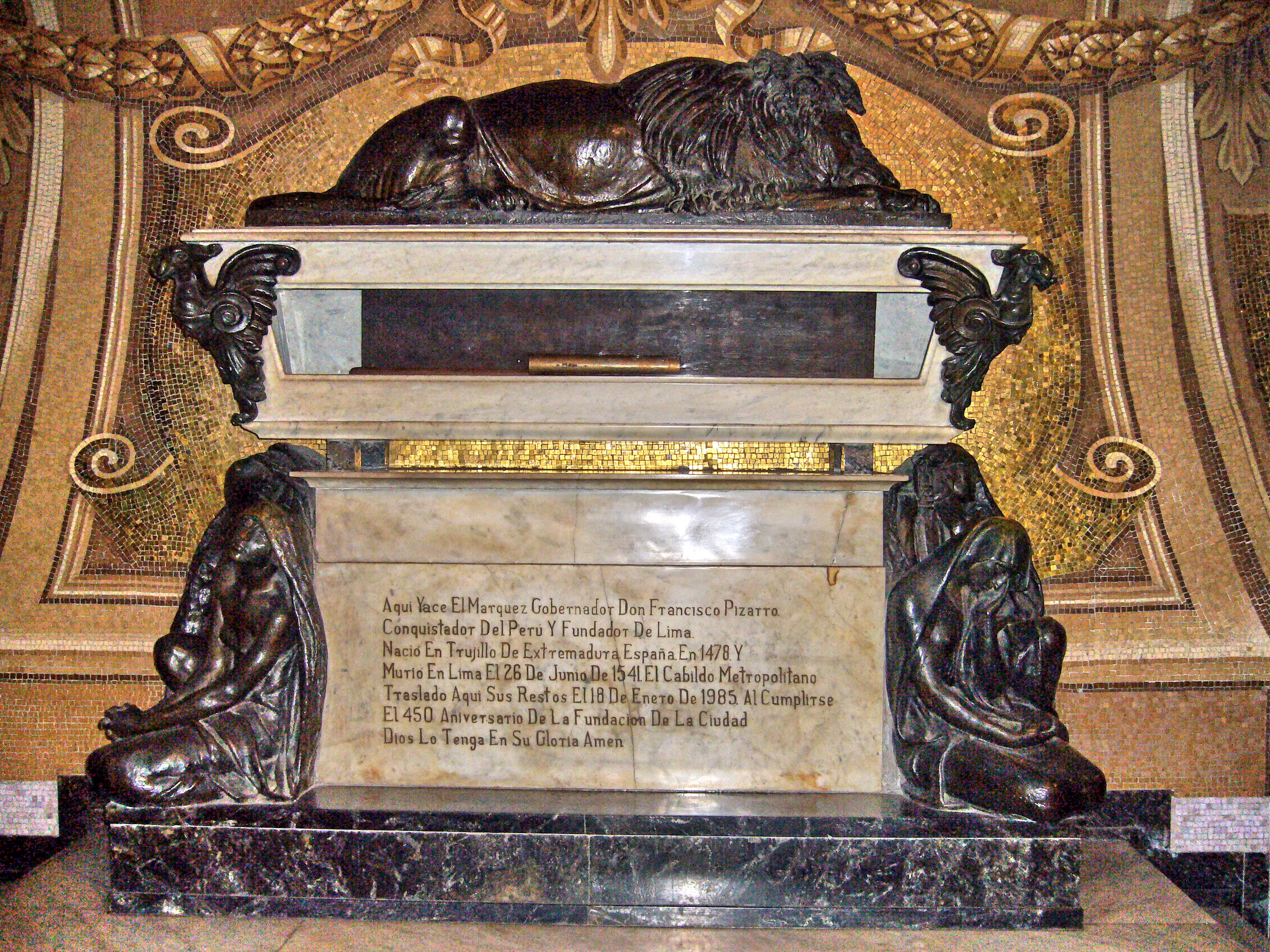
Tomb of Francisco Pizarro at the Metropolitan Cathedral of Lima.

In the right nave, starting again from the entrance, is first the crypt of Francisco Pizarro, completely covered with mosaics alluding to the Conquest. On one of the walls you can see the coat of arms of Lima. In the sarcophagus it is seen that the head is separated from the body, possibly detached by multiple manipulations to which its remains were exposed. The original body was discovered in the early 20th century. In front of the sarcophagus, there is a small chest containing earth from his hometown, Trujillo.

Formerly, when entering the Cathedral of Lima, it was always thought that Pizarro's body was the one that was presented in a glass urn located in an altar of the Cathedral itself. Precisely the tourist guides indicated the right side, near the entrance, the altar was made of marble, and there was a mummified skeleton, of a saffron color. In 1891, on the occasion of the 350th anniversary of his death, it was decided to publicly display his remains in this place, and since then it has been a must for everyone who visits Lima.

In 1977 the cathedral was subjected to restoration when some workers of the crypt of the cathedral, accidentally came across a lead box with some blurred inscriptions. Behind a wall was a niche where they found the box. The inscription read: Here is the head of the Lord Marquis Don Francisco Pizarro, who discovered and won the kingdoms of Peru and placed in the Royal Crown of Castile. Next to it was found a coffin lined on the inside with velvet, containing a large number of bones. A team of scientists managed to determine that those remains belonged to a woman, two children, and an adult male who was later found to be Pizarro. In addition, these scientists worked long months to determine the origin of these remains.

In this chapel was originally the altarpiece of the Cristo del Auxilio, now in the Chapel of Santa Ana.

==== Sacristy and Chapter House ====
Returning to the Sacristy and already entering it, we find ourselves in the ante-sacristy, also called the room of zodiac, since on its walls there are 12 paintings painted in the Bassano workshop, alluding to the 12 zodiacal signs. Attached is the Sala Mons. Alberto Brazzini, inaugurated in honor of the prelate, who died on 29 May 2001, who was the Auxiliary Bishop of Lima. Numerous objects of religious art are exhibited here, his heritage and donated by the family to the cathedral; besides some of his episcopal ornaments and jewels.

Moving on to the Sacristy, we see the large chest of drawers the work of the Basque Juan Martínez de Arrona, with wooden panels decorated with images of Christ, the twelve apostles, Saint Joseph and Saint John the Baptist; as well as the twelve articles of faith of the Apostles' Creed on each panel. Beautiful ancient liturgical vestments are also on display here.

Finally, we arrived at the Chapter House, where the members of the Ecclesiastical Council used to meet (and continue to meet on Saturday afternoons). On the walls there are medallions of all the Archbishops of Lima, with a review of each one. Vestments and ornaments used by Pope John Paul II on his two visits to Peru, sacred vessels that were his gifts to the Peruvian Church and some clothing of the former archbishops are also exhibited here.

==== Burials ====
- Francisco Pizarro
- Diego Morcillo Rubio de Auñón, Archbishop of La Plata and Lima, and Viceroy of Peru
- Saint Turibius of Mogrovejo
- Jerónimo de Loayza
- Augusto Vargas Alzamora
- Luigi Arrigoni
- Juan Guevara
- Antonio de Mendoza
- Juan Landázuri Ricketts

== See also ==
- Historic Centre of Lima
- Roman Catholic Archdiocese of Lima
