= Pedro de Noguera =

Spanish sculptor and architect

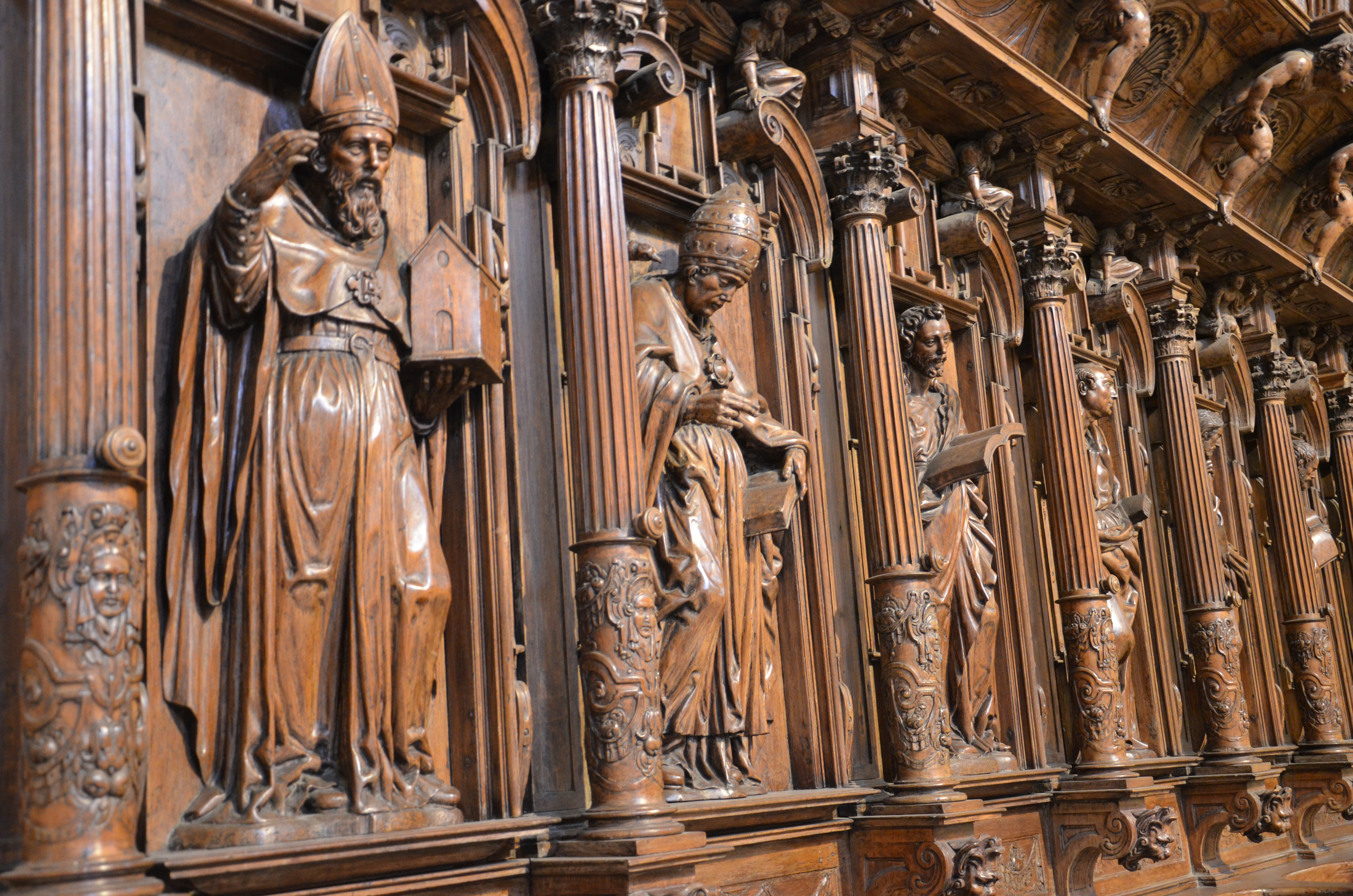
Choirstalls, Cathedral of Lima, Peru

Pedro de Noguera (Barcelona, c. 1580 – Lima c. 1660) was a Spanish sculptor and architect. He learned his art in Seville. In 1619 he moved to Viceroyalty of Peru and worked mostly in Lima where he executed with Martín Alonso de Mesa the choirstalls of the Cathedral.

== Other works ==
- Dead Christ (1619) (sculpture) of the Confraternity of Our Lady of Solitude (Lima).
- Altarpiece of St. Francis church (1623). El Callao.
- In 1635 designed the main entrance of the cathedral.
- Fountain of the Plaza Mayor, Lima
