= Convent of Our Lady of the Angels =

Church and convent in Lima, Peru

- Convento de Nuestra Señora de los Ángeles
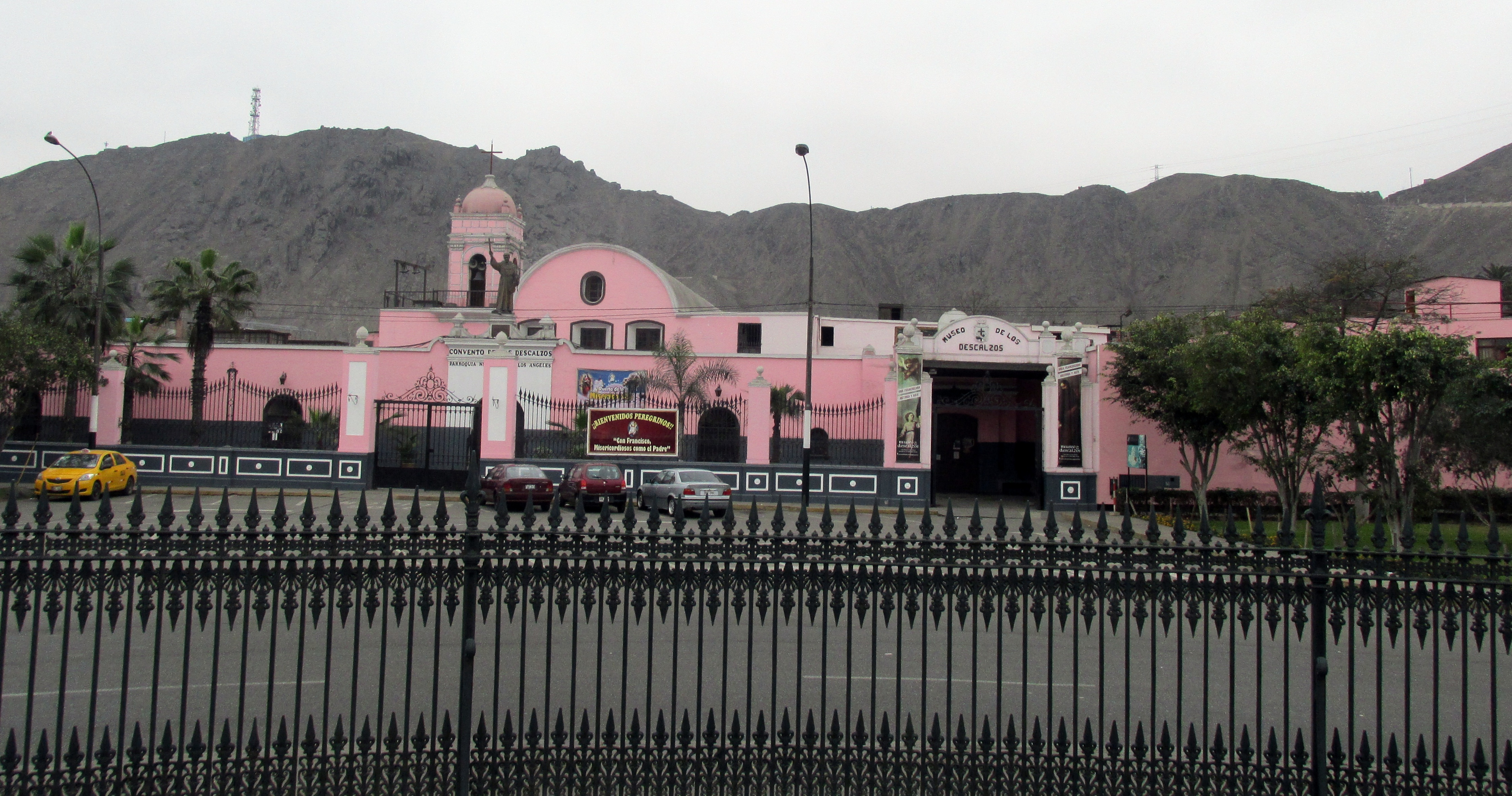
- Interactive map of Convent of Our Lady of the Angels

Monastery information
- Other name: Convento de los Descalzos
- Order: Franciscan
- Denomination: Catholic
- Established: 1595
- Archdiocese: Archdiocese of Lima

Architecture
- Heritage designation: Cultural heritage of the Nation
- Designated date: 1972
- Style: Spanish Colonial

Site
- Location: Lima
- Country: Peru
- Coordinates: 12.0336°S 77.0245°W

The Convent of Our Lady of the Angels (Spanish: Convento de Nuestra Señora de los Ángeles), commonly known as the Iglesia y Convento de los Descalzos, is a Franciscan convent in Rímac District, Lima, Peru. It was declared a cultural heritage of Peru in 1972.

== History ==
Founded in 1595 by the Franciscan Order and under the auspices of Archbishop Toribio de Mogrovejo, on land donated by María de Valera and her son Luis Guillén, benefactors of the order, the monastic complex is located in the historic district of Rímac at the foot of the San Cristóbal Hill and at the end of the Alameda de los Descalzos, a promenade laid out in 1611 by order of the viceroy Juan de Mendoza y Luna, Marqués de Montesclaros, in order to facilitate and beautify the path to the convent. The local population nicknamed it the barefoot convent because of the sandals worn by the Franciscans.

It has a simple and austere architecture, without decorations, with long corridors and rooms at different levels due to the inclination of the hill where it sits. The characteristics of its construction resemble it to a rural hacienda house.

The Franciscan convent was an important evangelizing center from where the missionaries in charge of teaching Christian doctrine to the original peoples of the Peruvian highlands departed.

On December 18, 1981, the Museo de los Descalzos was opened in its facilities. The relics of Francisco Solano, Francisco de Asís and Antonio de Padua are exhibited, along with more than 300 canvases from the Cusco, Lima and Quito school, and a library with more than 15,000 goatskin books from the 16th to the 20th centuries.
