= Iglesia de Santa Liberata =

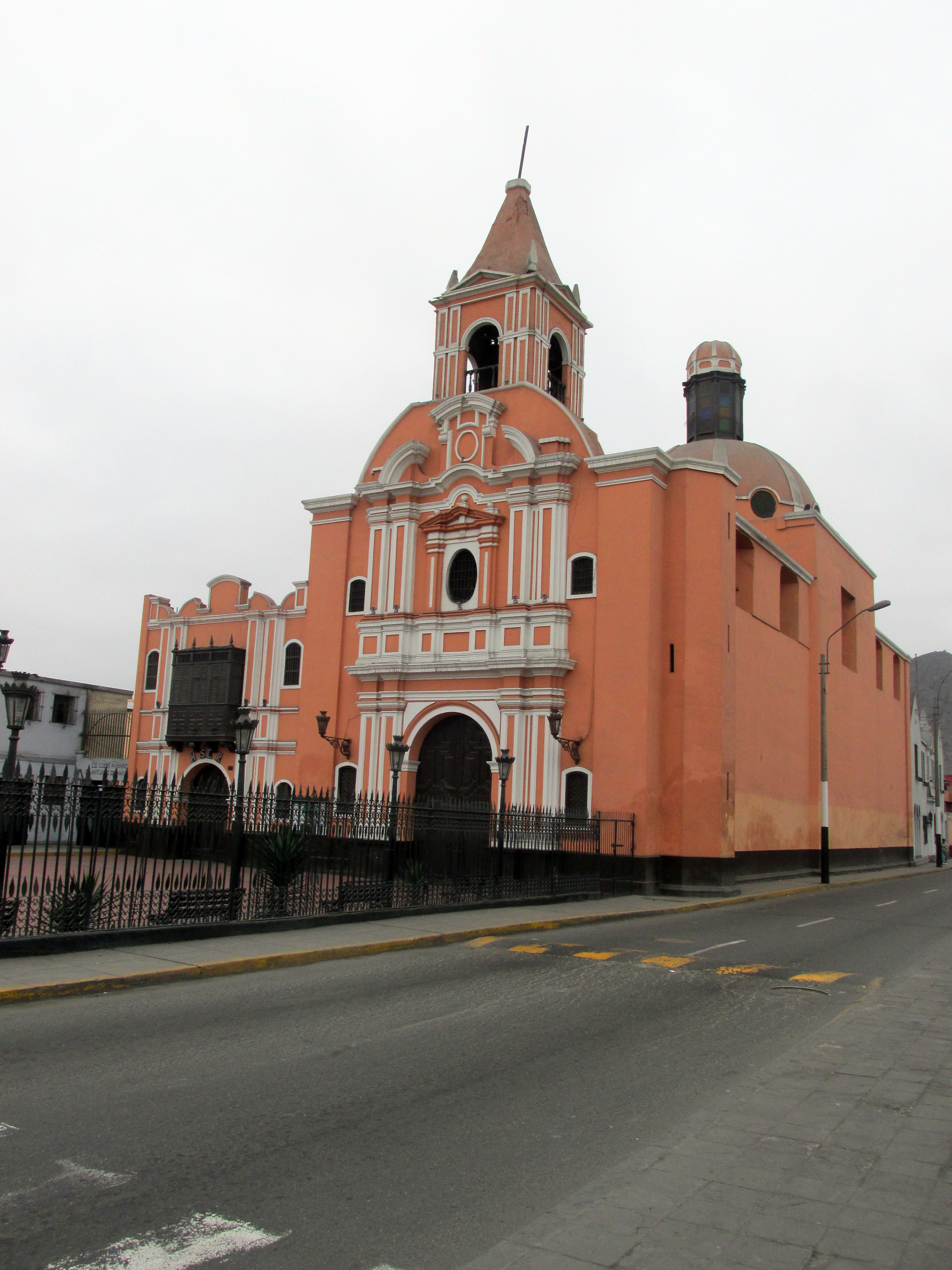
- Facade
- Iglesia de Santa Liberata
- Location: Lima
- Country: Peru
- Denomination: Roman Catholic

History
- Founded: 1714

Architecture
- Style: Baroque
- Completed: 1716

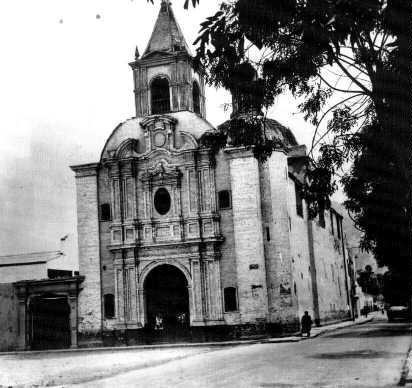
Iglesia de Santa Liberata in 1911

The Iglesia de Santa Liberata is a Catholic church located in Alameda de los Descalzos in Rímac District, Lima, Lima Region, Peru.

The church was first built in 1716. In 1745, the Cruciferous Fathers of Good Death took control over the church until 1826 and made many changes, along with architectural improvements.

== History ==
Before the church was built, an orchard of orange trees was located on the premises.

On January 20, 1711, a priest was introduced to the priest of the Tabernacle, located on the left side of the Cathedral of Lima. This priest asked the priest of the Tabernacle to allow him to seek his certificate of baptism in the parish books. The presbyter agreed. Later, the golden ciborium containing the consecrated hosts for the various churches of Lima had disappeared. No one noticed the disappearance until January 30 when the per diem was required for a priest to administer to a dying man. The absence of the ciborium caused that an armed population to revolt. The ecclesiastical authorities decide to close all the temples of the capital and suspend the administration of the Eucharist. Lima was left without Masses and without the sacrament of communion.

The thief, Fernando Hurtado de Chávez, was captured after he attempted to sell the stones that adorned the ciborium to pulpero don Jaime Alvítez. Chávez confessed that the relic was buried and wrapped in a paper next to an orange tree in one of the bushes near the Alameda de los Descalzos.

The Iglesia de Santa Liberata was built in this spot two years later. The main altar is located above the hole where the hosts were found. The religious building was named Santa Liberata, for being the patron of the native town of the viceroy, the Spanish city of Sigüenza.
