= Alameda de los Descalzos =

Alameda in Peru

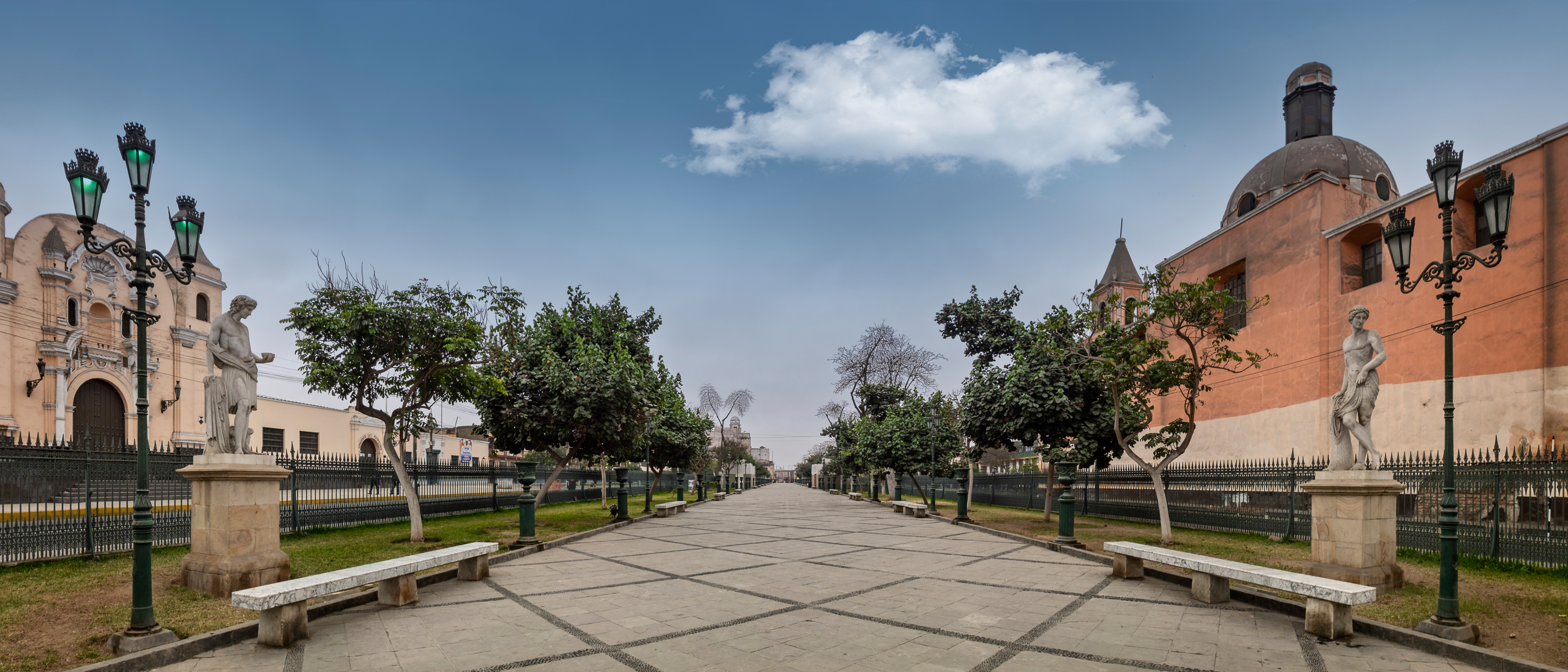
The alameda in 2022.

The Alameda de los Descalzos is an alameda located in Rímac District, Lima, Peru. One of the best-known places in the district, around it stand—among other buildings—the churches of Santa Liberata, El Patrocinio and Nuestra Señora de los Ángeles. Nearby is also the place where Micaela Villegas's Mill House was located. It measures about 450 m.

== History ==
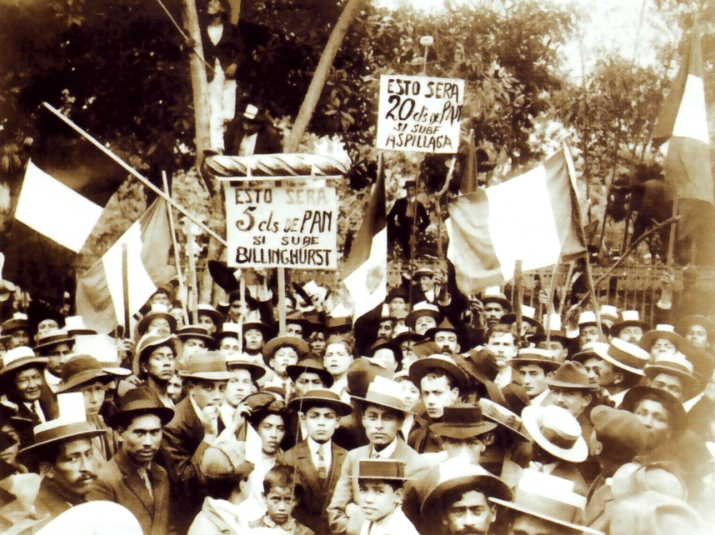
Demonstrations at the alameda in favour of Guillermo Billinghurst's presidential candidacy in 1912.

It was initially called Alameda Grande. Ordered to be laid out by Viceroy Juan de Mendoza y Luna in 1611 in the likeness of the Alameda de Hércules in the Spanish city of Seville, a public garden created in 1574 and the oldest in Spain and Europe. The Sevillian model was followed by other creators of urban gardens in Spain such as that of Écija, province of Seville, or that of Alameda Central in Mexico City. The Alameda de los Descalzos de Lima was rebuilt in 1770 by Viceroy Manuel Amat y Juniet. It is located at the end of Alcázar Avenue, approximately 900 meters north of the Plaza Mayor.

Lima's oral tradition collects stories that furtive encounters between forbidden lovers took place in this place, where the girls of the time, accompanied on their walks by chaperones, brushed against their suitors without even looking at them. It is the cradle of well-known stories about secrets, mischievous smiles and the graceful walk of the coquetry of the famous tapadas limeñas in their eager and seductive walks of gentlemen in love. It is also a witness to romantic stories and memories, the most famous of which is the romance between Viceroy Amat and the Perricholi, who were the talk of the demure society ladies of the time.

It is also said that, at night, ghosts of widows, suicides, and people who died in the Spanish Inquisition or mysterious congregations of ghosts parade around the alameda.

According to the chroniclers of the Viceroyalty, its original design consisted of three streets: two lateral ones for carriages and a central one for pedestrians. There were three fountains, donated by citizen Agustín Hipólito de Landaburu, and eight rows of trees that offered walkers shade and coolness. The definitive remodeling that it underwent in the 19th century turned it into a romantic walk. In 1856, President Ramón Castilla gave it a new and definitive unitary outline by ordering the placement of a wrought iron fence imported from England, giving it the romanticist touch of the early 18th century.

It currently has side bars, one hundred lined marble benches, twelve Carrara marble statues that represent the signs of the zodiac and the months of the year, as well as 50 ornamental wrought iron vases by artisans of the time.

The Municipality of Lima carried out renovation works between 2014 and 2015.

== Statues ==
The sculptures of the alameda have as their theme the zodiacal signs and some gods from Greek mythology. In 2018 these were declared Cultural Heritage of the Nation as part of the set of 91 monumental sculptures located in the Historic Centre of Lima.

Sculptures at the Alameda de los Descalzos
Name	Image	Description
Aquarius		Pan
Pisces		Poseidon
Aries		Ares
Taurus		Dionysus
Gemini		Hephaestus
Cancer		Chronos
Leo		Apollo
Virgo		Hermaphroditus
Libra		Hermes
Scorpio		It represents a young woman, she wears a crown of flowers on her head, she wears a long tunic and a long blanket, and in her right hand she holds a basket of flowers. Next to her, a scorpion climbs a trunk and at her feet appears the inscription 'F. Baini Fecit Rome 1855'
Sagittarius		Uranus
Capricorn		Zeus

== See also ==
- Alameda Chabuca Granda
- Church of Nuestra Señora de Copacabana
