= Jirón Azángaro =

Street in Lima, Peru

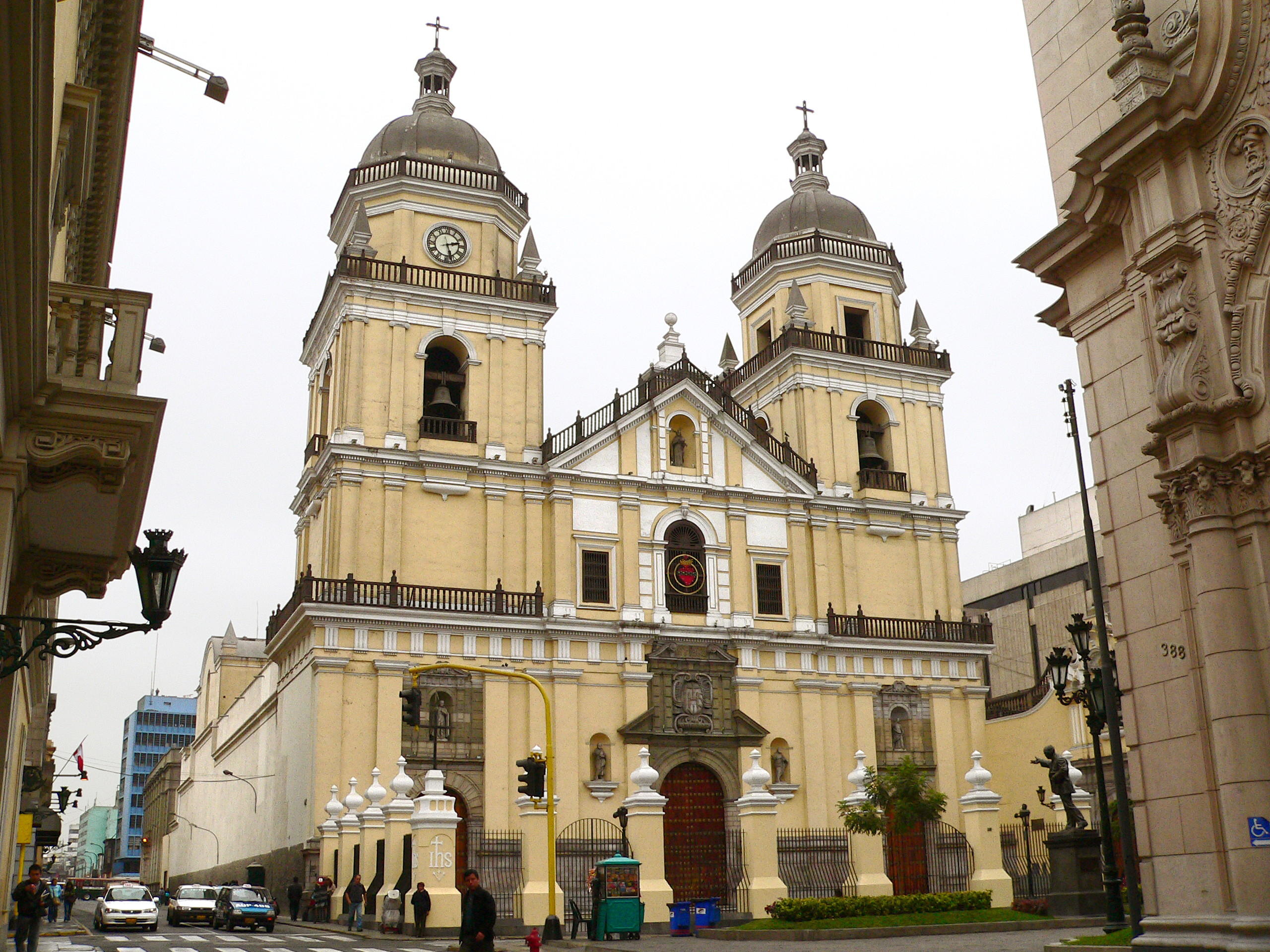
- Basilica of Saint Peter
- Interactive map of Jirón Azángaro
- Part of: Damero de Pizarro
- Namesake: Azángaro Province
- From: Jirón Áncash
- Major junctions: See list: Jirón Junín; Jirón Huallaga; Jirón Ucayali; Jirón Santa Rosa; Jirón Cuzco; Jirón Puno; Jirón Apurímac; Colmena Avenue; Jirón Lino Cornejo; Jirón Pachitea; Roosevelt Avenue
- To: Jirón Miguel Aljovín (Note: The street's traditional 11th block has since been made into its own street (Pasaje Buenaventura), which joins Miguel Aljovín and Manuel Cuadros streets, passing behind the Palace of Justice.)

Construction
- Completed: 1535

Azángaro Street (Spanish: Jirón Azángaro) is a major street in the Damero de Pizarro, an area of the historic centre of Lima, Peru. The street starts at its intersection with Áncash Street and continues until it reaches Manuel Aljovín Street, next to the Palace of Justice.

== Name ==
The street's name comes from the project that was ultimately adopted in 1862, which replaced the city's traditional names with names that reflected the country's political geography. The term jirón is a type of street, whose axis is formed from a variety of different, single-block streets. It is named after Azángaro Province, located in Puno.

== History ==
The then-unnamed multi-street axis was laid by Francisco Pizarro when he founded the city of Lima on January 18, 1535. In 1862, the city adopted the naming project of Mariano Bolognesi, an idea first proposed by Manuel Atanasio Fuentes in 1857. This new street was named after Azángaro Province.

The traditional Calle de Aparicio (its current first block) was named after the surname of either Lorenzo José or Manuel Martínez de Aparicio. It was originally named after Fructuoso de Ulloa, a general and government official. It was additionally called "Del Milagro" at one point, after the chapel of the same name that forms part of the Basilica and Convent of San Francisco.

The traditional Calle de las Aldabas (its current second block) was named, according to Luis A. Eguiguren, after a house with peculiar door knockers (Spanish: aldabas), their peculiarness being a sign that other knockers around the city were manufactured there. Notable residents include the Valencia noble family, the Marquesses of Puente y Sotomayor, and the Marquesses of Casa Dávila, who lived in the corner with San José Street.

The traditional Calle de Beytia (its current third block) was named after the street's inhabitants of the same name, whose patriarch was corregidor Juan Casimiro de Beytia. It was originally named after canon Andrés Diez de Abreu in 1613. The houses of the counts of Premio Real were located at the corner with Melchormalo, while the residence of Simón Díaz de Rávago, knight of the Order of Santiago, was located at the corner with Estudios Street (later "Ricardo Palma"). Another resident was José Martín de Riglos y la Sala, first consul of Argentina to Peru and confidential agent of José de San Martín, who lived at the corner with San Pedro, next to the residence of the Marquesses of Torre Tagle.

The traditional Calle de Gato (its current fourth block) was named after oidor Francisco Alvárez Gato, who lived there. Juan de Soto, narrator of the Real Audiencia of Lima and later dean of the Royal University of Lima, lived in the corner with San Pedro. He lived with—and later married—Luisa Melgarejo, who was also well known. Other notable residents include Diego Núñez de Figueroa, merchant and regidor, and the Counts of Polentinos.

The traditional Calle de Negreyros (its current fifth block) was named after the noble family of the same name, whose patriarch, Jorge Negreyros y Silva, lived there alongside his family. In 1613, it was known after Alonso Gutiérrez de Ulloa, member of the Peruvian Inquisition. It was later known as "Puerta Falsa de las Bernardas" after the Monastery of the Holy Trinity of the Cistercian nuns. Another name it took was that of a vecindad known as "el Callejón del Medio Pollo". The Counts of San Donás resided in the corner with Corcovado, while the family of regidor Lorenzo de Encalada lived in the corner of La Rifa. Pedro de Arriz, founder of the Independence of Peru, also lived here for a period.

The traditional Calle de Juan Pablo (its current sixth block) was named after a neighbour of the same name, possibly Juan Pablo Messía, according to Luis A. Eguiguren. It was known during the 18th century after Juan Roldán, possibly captain Juan Roldán Dávila. According to Eguiguren, presbyter José Potau of Saint Sebastian Church had his residence in the corner with Corcovado street. Potau was the owner of an orchard in the neighbourhood of San Lázaro, which eventually acquired his name and is the current location of the barracks of the same name.

The traditional Calle de Huérfanos (its current seventh block) was named after the church of the same name. In 1613, it was already known under a similar name. The church was financed by José Nieto de Lara following the request of Luis de Ojeda (who called himself "Luis Pecador"), who took care of orphaned children, and it was destroyed by an earthquake in 1746, being rebuilt two years later.

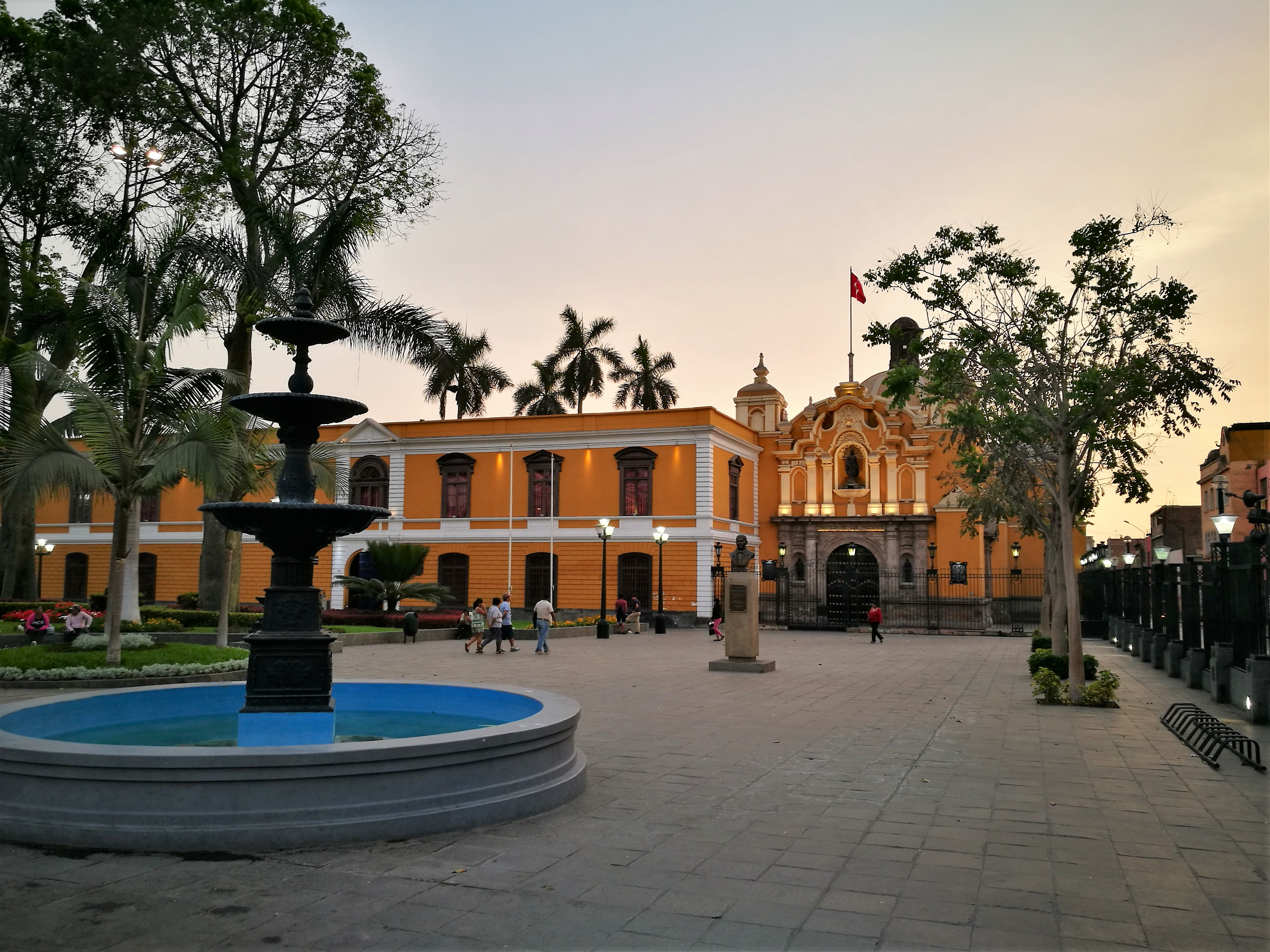
University Park (Calle de San Carlos).

The traditional Calle de San Carlos is its current eighth block. The traditional Calle de Noviciado (its current ninth block) was known after the novitiate of Saint Anthony the Abbot, who moved into a building there that was inaugurated in 1610, in what was then an orchard known as "la Chacarilla de San Bernardo", later the Parque Universitario. The building is currently the Casona of the National University of San Marcos.

The traditional Calle de Guadalupe (its current tenth block) was named after the church of the same name. Once the adjacent school was suppressed, it became a barracks. The church was repaired by colonel Juan Nepomuceno Vargas and presbyter Tomás Loaces. The barracks and its prison were ultimately demolished to build the Palace of Justice.

The traditional Calle de Buenaventura (its former eleventh block) was named after the Franciscan school of the same name. In 1611, government scribe Alonso Ramos Cervantes gave part of an orchard and a hermitage he owned in what would shortly after become Guadalupe Square (Spanish: Plazuela de Guadalupe) to the monks of San Francisco, who created a school named after Saint Bonaventure adjacent to a church of the same name. Its proper name was "San Buenaventura".

=== Recent history ===
The street's final block disappeared with the construction of Paseo de la República Avenue and the Palace of Justice, a project that took place during the early 20th century.

== Route ==
The street's first block begins next to the Basilica and Convent of San Francisco. Its northwestern corner houses the Casa de Pilatos, the headquarters of the Constitutional Court of Peru. It is limited to the south by the house of the dukes of San Carlos, a noble family who supported the independentist cause. The family housed Libertador Simón Bolívar when he arrived to the city in 1823.

The second block's northeastern corner is occupied by the Casa Harth. The building, which dates back to 1755, was owned by Antonio de Querejazu y Mollinedo, who served as oidor and belonged to one of the richest families of the city. It was eventually acquired by Teodoro Harth and his company, founded in 1854, receiving its current name. It was purchased by the defunct Arte Express in 2019. To its south is the art deco-style Gildemeister Building, built between 1927 and 1928 by the Compañía General de Construcciones del Perú and designed by Werner Benno Lange. It was one of the first five-storey buildings of the city and had two elevators: the first for the owner and the second for the rest of its occupants. It is named after Gildemeister y Cia, a German sugar production company based in the Casa Grande hacienda in La Libertad. Across the street from the aforementioned building, is the republican Finca de la calle de Aldabas, located in the former streets of Santa Apolonia and Melchormalo. It was the property of the Monastery of the Conception, who sold it to Ana Inclán in 1747. After her death, the Marquis of Villa Blanca, Antonio de Mena, acquired it in 1778. The convent owned the property until 1862, when the Peruvian State acquired it.

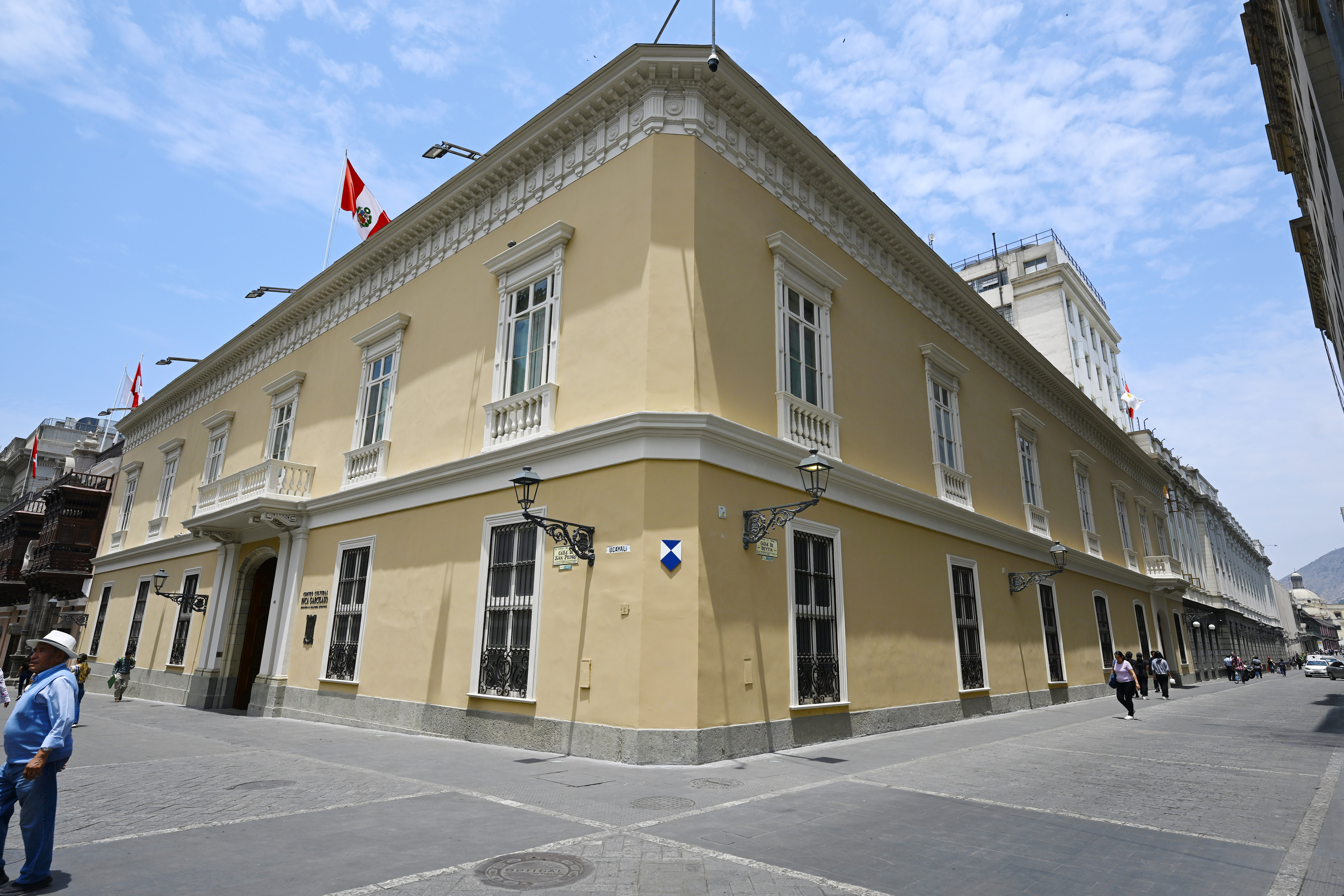
Casa Aspíllaga (block 3).

The third block begins with the Caja de Depósitos y Consignaciones on its eastern corner. Designed by Ricardo de Jaxa Malachowski, the building was completed in 1917 and housed the private bank of the same name until its nationalisation in 1963. It was subsequently donated by the Peruvian government to the National Superior Autonomous School of Fine Arts on September 27, 1996. The building of the former Banco del Perú y Londres is across the street. Named after the bank of the same name, it was designed by architect Julio Ernesto Lattini in 1905. The work was commissioned by the bank's director, José Payán. It was later acquired by the Banco Popular del Perú. After the bank declared bankruptcy in the 1990s, it was acquired by Congress and is currently known as the Edificio Luis Alberto Sánchez, named after the APRA politician. The street ends with the Casa Aspíllaga on its southwestern corner, a building that once served as the property of politician Ántero Aspíllaga Barrera. It was first registered in 1685, and its current design corresponds to a 19th-century neoclassical republican style. It was acquired by the state in 1953 and administered by the Foreign Ministry. It currently functions as the Inca Garcilaso Cultural Centre.

The fourth block houses San Pedro Square, which is surrounded by the aforementioned Casa Aspíllaga, as well as the two buildings of the Peruvian ombudsman (formerly a bank and an insurance company) and the Basilica and Convent of San Pedro. The headquarters of the Central Reserve Bank of Peru are located next to the convent.

The street's fifth block begins with the Edificio Caucato, and the 1,500 m^{2} Casa Elguera across the street from it. The latter was built c. 1862–1865 and located in the former Aldabas street, in the corner with Santa Rosa. Originally bought by Francisco Tamayo de Mendoza y Navarra, Marquis of Villahermosa de San José, in 1690, its current construction dates from the mid-19th century, built by landowner Buenaventura Elguera. The Casa Negreiros is located south of the former, and is named after Jorge Negreiros y Silva, a 17th-century general and merchant from Seville.

The street's sixth block houses a number of commercial establishments. Its northern side was unaffected by the broadening of Emancipation Avenue, today Cuzco Street.

The street's seventh block is the site of the Antigua Pastelería y Panadería Huérfanos, a well-known historic bakery and restaurant. To its front is the house where Felipe Santiago Salaverry, former president of Peru, was born. To its south is the Quinta Los Huérfanos, named after the church of the same name, whose official name is that of Sacred Heart Church.

The street's eighth block is the site of Luis Alberto Sánchez Square, also known as "Culture Park" (Parque de la Cultura), built by demolishing an entire city block of houses. It is split into two parts by Nicolás de Piérola Avenue, with the University of San Marcos' historic campus, church, and adjacent park being located on its other side.

The campus building continues into the street's ninth block, which is cut into two parts by Bambas Street and continues until it reaches Roosevelt Avenue.

The street's tenth (and final) block is the site of several businesses dedicated to copies and printing, as well as Aramburú Square (Spanish: Plazuela Aramburú), a public square on its southeastern corner. In 2014 and 2015, a number of police raids took place on the street where counterfeit documents were forged by criminals. As of 2023, said businesses continued to operate, selling false residence permits to foreigners in Peru. From 2024 to 2025, the block's western side was razed in its entirety to make way for Qantua, a 12.700 m^{2} mixed housing and commercial development that began in January 2025.

The Pasaje Buenaventura, formerly part of the street, passes behind the Palace of Justice. Two police stations exist on its right side.

== Transportation ==
The avenue allows for regular vehicular transit in its entirety. Its first blocks, however, have been intervened to make pedestrian traffic easier.

=== Bus service ===
The street runs parallel to Route E of the Metropolitano bus system from its sixth block onwards. The Promenade of the Naval Heroes is located one block away from the street's final block, where the system's Central Station is located.

== See also ==
- Historic Centre of Lima
- Lima District
