= Bolivia Avenue =

Avenue in Lima, Peru

Avenida Bolivia
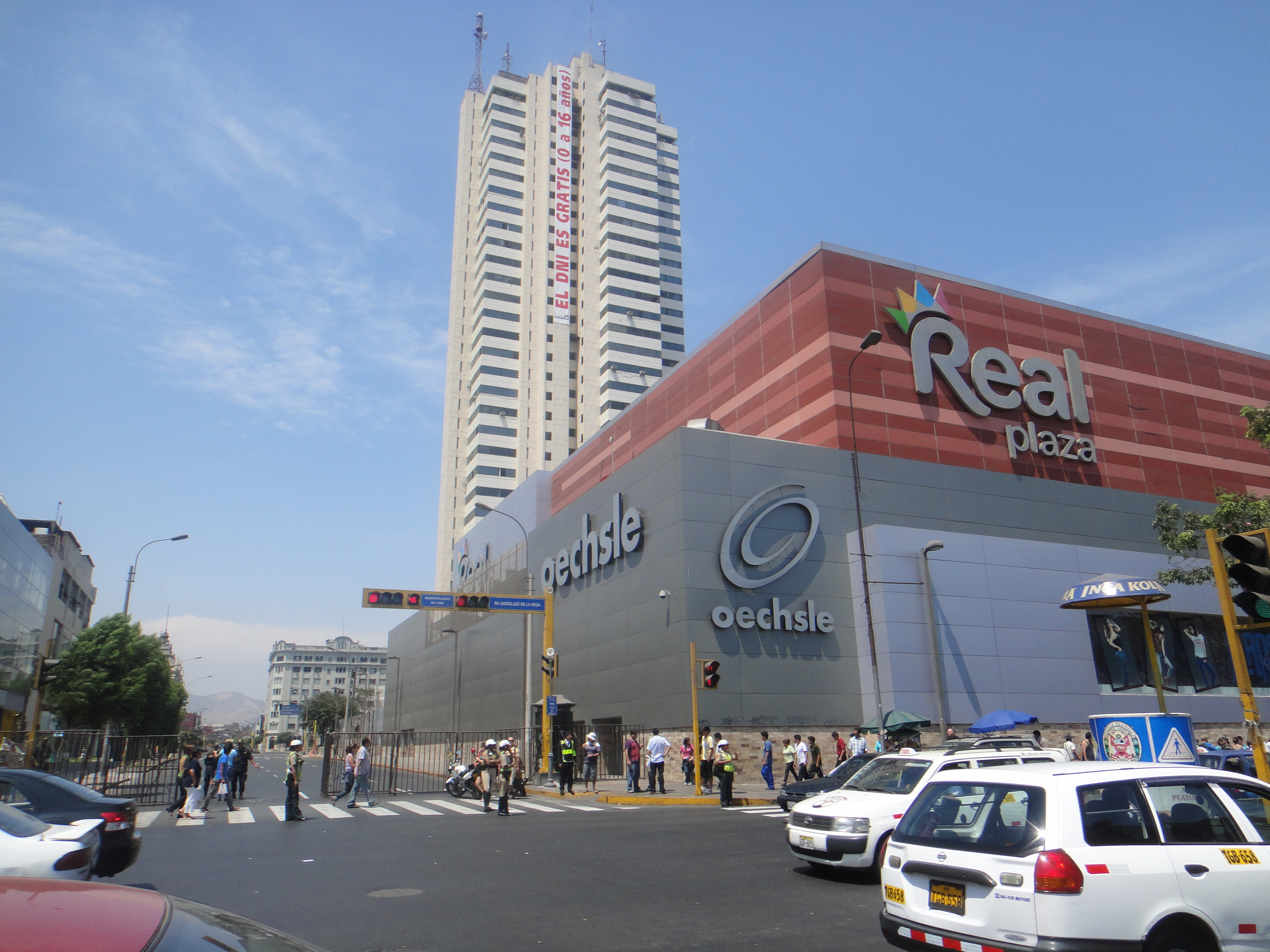
- Real Plaza at the intersection with Wilson Ave.
- Part of: Historic Centre of Lima
- Namesake: Bolivia
- From: Paseo de la República
- Major junctions: Alfonso Ugarte Ave., Wilson Ave., Jr. Carabaya, Jr. Unión
- To: Arica Avenue

Bolivia Avenue (Spanish: Avenida Bolivia), formerly Industry Avenue (Spanish: Avenida de la Industria), is an avenue in the historic centre of Lima, Peru. It begins at its intersection with the Paseo de la República, next to the Lima Civic Center, and continues until it reaches Arica Avenue in Breña. It is continued to the east by Roosevelt Avenue.

== History ==
In 1684, the Walls of Lima were built around the city, with the current avenue being cut off at its modern intersection with the jirón Chota. From 1856 to 1961, the Lima Penitentiary was located on the street's first block.

In 1875, president Manuel Pardo Lavalle inaugurated the Lima–Magdalena railway, located approximately where the Lima Civic Center is today. The service was suspended in 1899.

In 1945, the avenue was extended, with its prolongation, now named after the U.S. President, being formally inaugurated by Councilor Max Arnillas Arana, who gave a speech at the inauguration ceremony on behalf of the Municipality of Lima.

The street was temporarily closed in 2020 due to patching and recapping work that took place in its section between Alfonso Ugarte and Arica avenues.

== Overview ==
The first block of the street starts at the Paseo de la República, next to the Lima Civic Center, formerly the Lima Penitentiary. Also on the first block are a number of electronics stores. These are located on the former site of Belén Church, which was demolished to make way for the avenue's construction.

The College of Our Lady of Guadalupe is located at the avenue's intersection with the twelfth block of Alfonso Ugarte Avenue since 1909. Opposite of the school is the El Sexto Police Station, formerly a prison built from 1905 to 1910, best known for the violent riot that took place for fourteen hours on March 27, 1984, which left 22 dead and 10 wounded. Located across the street from the school is a two-storey house that formerly functioned as a former Banco Wiese branch, and has since operated as a Scotiabank bank.

== See also ==
- Historic Centre of Lima
- Roosevelt Avenue, Lima
