= Sacred Heart Church, Lima =

Church in Peru

Coordinates: 12°03′10″S 77°01′54″W

Sacred Heart Church
- Iglesia del Sagrado Corazón de Jesús
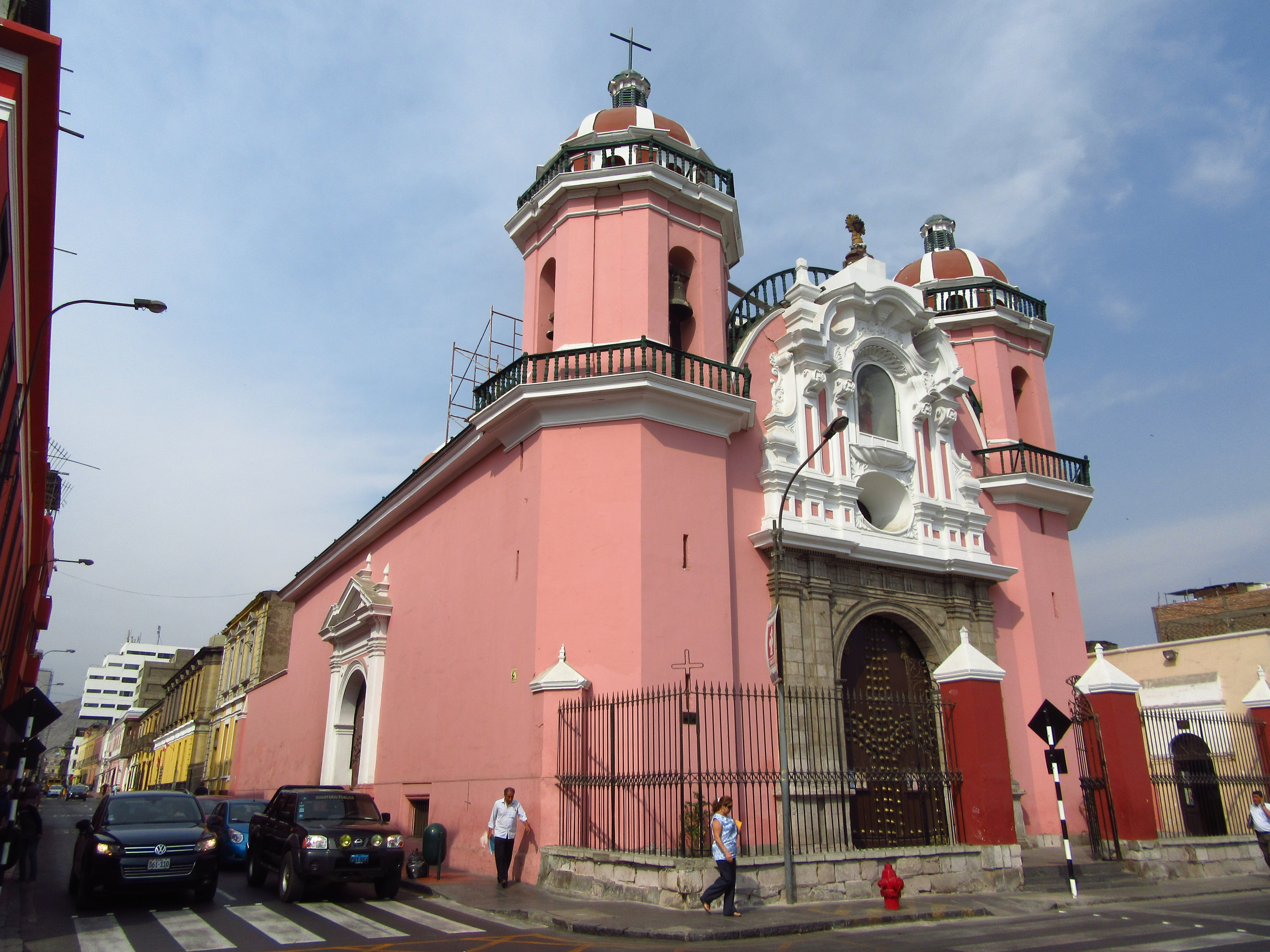

Religion
- Affiliation: Catholicism

Location
- Location: Jr. Azángaro 776, Lima
- Interactive map of Sacred Heart Church

Architecture
- Style: Late Baroque

The Sacred Heart Church (Spanish: Iglesia del Sagrado Corazón de Jesús), also known as the Church of the Orphans (Spanish: Iglesia de los Huérfanos), is a Catholic church dedicated to the Sacred Heart, located at the intersection of Jirón Azángaro and Jirón Apurímac in the historic centre of Lima, Peru.

== History ==
The first chapel in the area was built at the beginning of the 17th century and was financed by the Spanish Luis de Ojeda, known as 'Luis Pecador'. In its origins it was linked to the shelter of orphans, hence its name and its dedication to the Virgin of Atocha. In 1612 this was elevated to the category of vice-parish. In 1657 the church was intervened but the nature of the changes made is unknown. The temple appears with a different and inverse layout with the current one in the plan of the Mercedarian Pedro Nolasco Mere de 1685. It had a double-sided coverage on a wooden framework. The earthquakes of 1687 devastated the structure.

Since the earthquakes and during the first decades of the 18th century, the site was used as a warehouse for carriages and as a stable. In 1742 the land changed hands and it was decided to build a new church designed whose dimensions coincide with those of the current one, and which was by Manuel de Torquemada and built by Cristóbal de Vargas. The earthquake of 1746 caused the collapse of this second structure, which had been completed that same year. Despite the destruction, there are indications that the current construction has the same plans as that of that time. The temple was inaugurated on April 6, 1766. The design is attributed to the Jesuit priest Juan Rehr.

== Architecture ==
It is the only Catholic temple in Peru and Latin America with an elliptical plan, similar to that of the Catholic temples of Austria. It is in the Rococo limeño style, with late Baroque ornamentation. It has a light blue vaulted roof, from the beginning of its construction, which sought to imitate the nuances of the sky.

The main door on the main façade is flanked between twin bell towers. These have an octagonal plan on which there is a drum with the same shape that rests on four pillars. They also have a balustrade over the entablature.

The façade is composed of two bodies. The first is made of stone and contains the entrance opening, pilasters and a frieze with triglyphs and metopes in the Corinthian style. The second is characterized by the counterpoint between curved and straight lines, which gives rise to binary pilasters, pinnacles and an oblong elliptical window, above which is the single niche on the façade, which contains the effigy of the Sacred Heart of Jesus. Due to the contrast between the bodies, the church harbors stylistic similarities with the Panteón de los Próceres and Saint Paul's College, and due to the use of multiple binary pilasters with the church of San Pedro. For its part, the side cover is from the 19th century and its design is neoclassical.

The interior is made up of the subchoir, the nave and the presbytery, with the addition on the right side of a baptistery that evokes the main façade of the Saint Thomas Aquinas School. Around the curvature there are four shallow niche chapels.

== See also ==
- Historic centre of Lima
