= Edificio Rímac =

Cultural heritage site in Lima, Peru

Coordinates: 12.0553°S 77.0362°W

Rímac Building
- Edificio Rímac, Casa Roosevelt
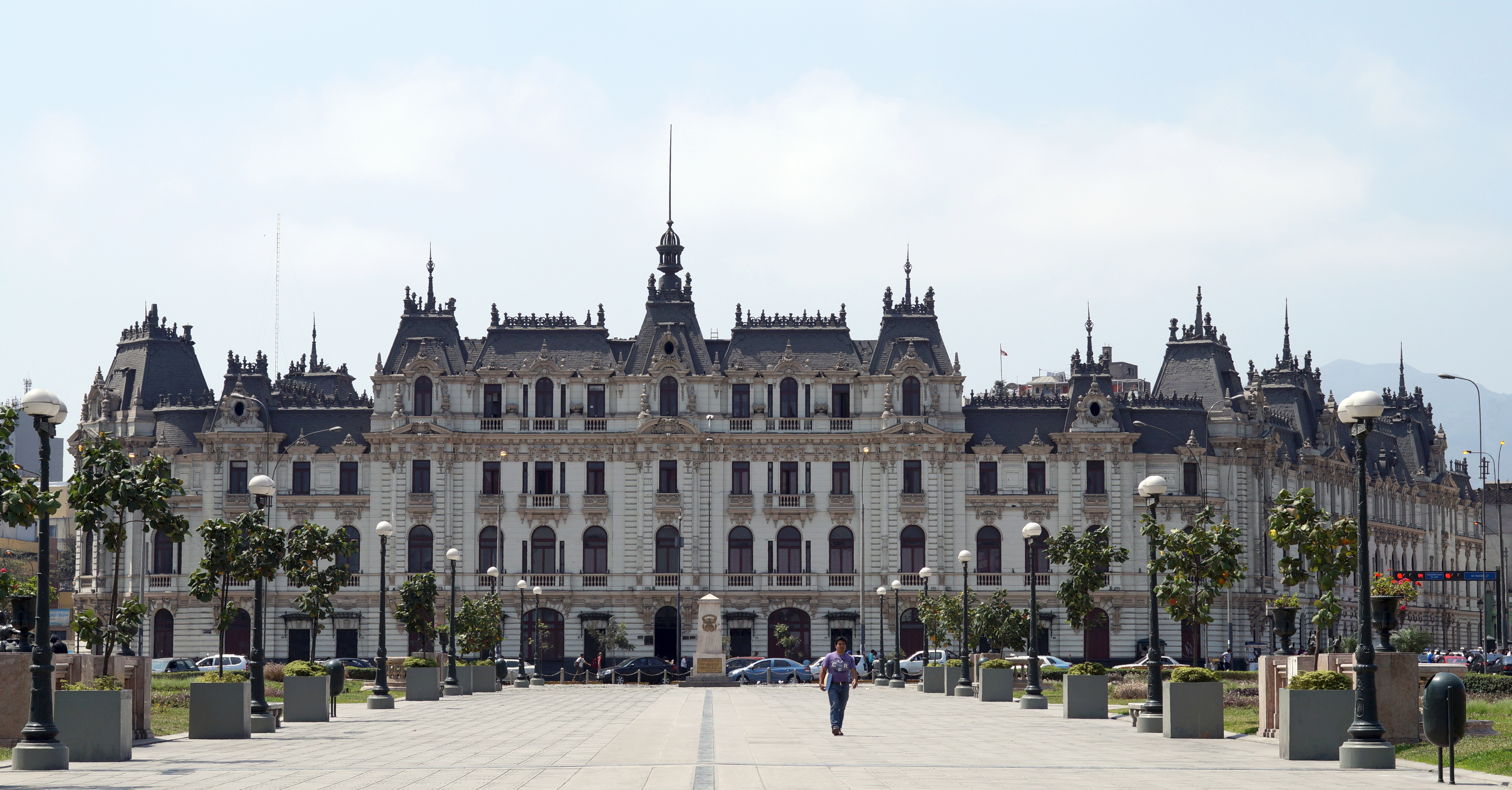
- The building seen from the Paseo de los Héroes Navales
- Interactive map of the Rímac Building area

General information
- Architectural style: Second Empire
- Location: Historic Centre of Lima, Av. Roosevelt 101/157; Jr. Unión 1177/1199
- Construction started: 1919
- Construction stopped: 1924
- Inaugurated: 1924
- Cost: Lp. 200,000
- Owner: Rímac Seguros; Municipality of Lima; Manuel Prado (1939–1945)

Design and construction
- Architect: Ricardo de Jaxa Malachowski

The Rímac Building (Spanish: Edificio Rímac), also known as the Roosevelt House (Spanish: Casa Roosevelt), is a building located in the centre of the city of Lima, Peru. It is currently under the administration of the insurance company Rímac Seguros. It is located at 101/157 Roosevelt Avenue and 1177/1199 Jirón de la Unión. It is the starting point of Paseo de la República Avenue.

== History ==
The Polish architect Ricardo de Jaxa Malachowski designed the building, which was built between 1919 and 1924. Its construction coincided with the real estate construction boom that the city of Lima had in the government of Augusto B. Leguía and with the construction of a whole series of Second Empire style buildings on the Avenida Nicolás de Piérola and Paseo Colón. Its first denomination is due to the fact that it was built at the request of the Rimac Seguros insurance company and its second denomination, Casa Roosevelt, due to the name of the avenue in which it is located.

It was the first multi-family building built in Lima. It was owned by Manuel Prado Ugarteche between 1939 and 1945. Here, the Otis elevator factory installed one of the first elevators in Lima. In 2007 the façade of the house was recovered by Arte Express and is currently owned by the Metropolitan Municipality of Lima.

== Architecture ==
It has a Second Empire style façade, symmetrical and divided vertically into three bodies. This is richly ornamented and many of its details were brought from France. It has arcades, Bossage details, garlands, medallions, pilasters and a series of individual mansards that finish off different bodies. It occupies a good part of the block in which it is located.

It has a façade of 84 metres on Roosevelt avenue, and 70 metres on the Jirones Carabaya and Unión. It has three interior patios that allow it to capture daylight and function as natural ventilation devices.

Some apartments on the first floor have direct access from the street. It has 69 apartments: 24 on the first two floors, and 45 on the last two.

== See also ==
- Historic Centre of Lima

== Bibliography ==
- Bonilla Di Tolla, Enrique (2009). Lima y el Callao: Guía de Arquitectura y Paisaje (PDF) (in Spanish). Junta de Andalucía. p. 28.
