= Hotel Maury =

Hotel in Peru

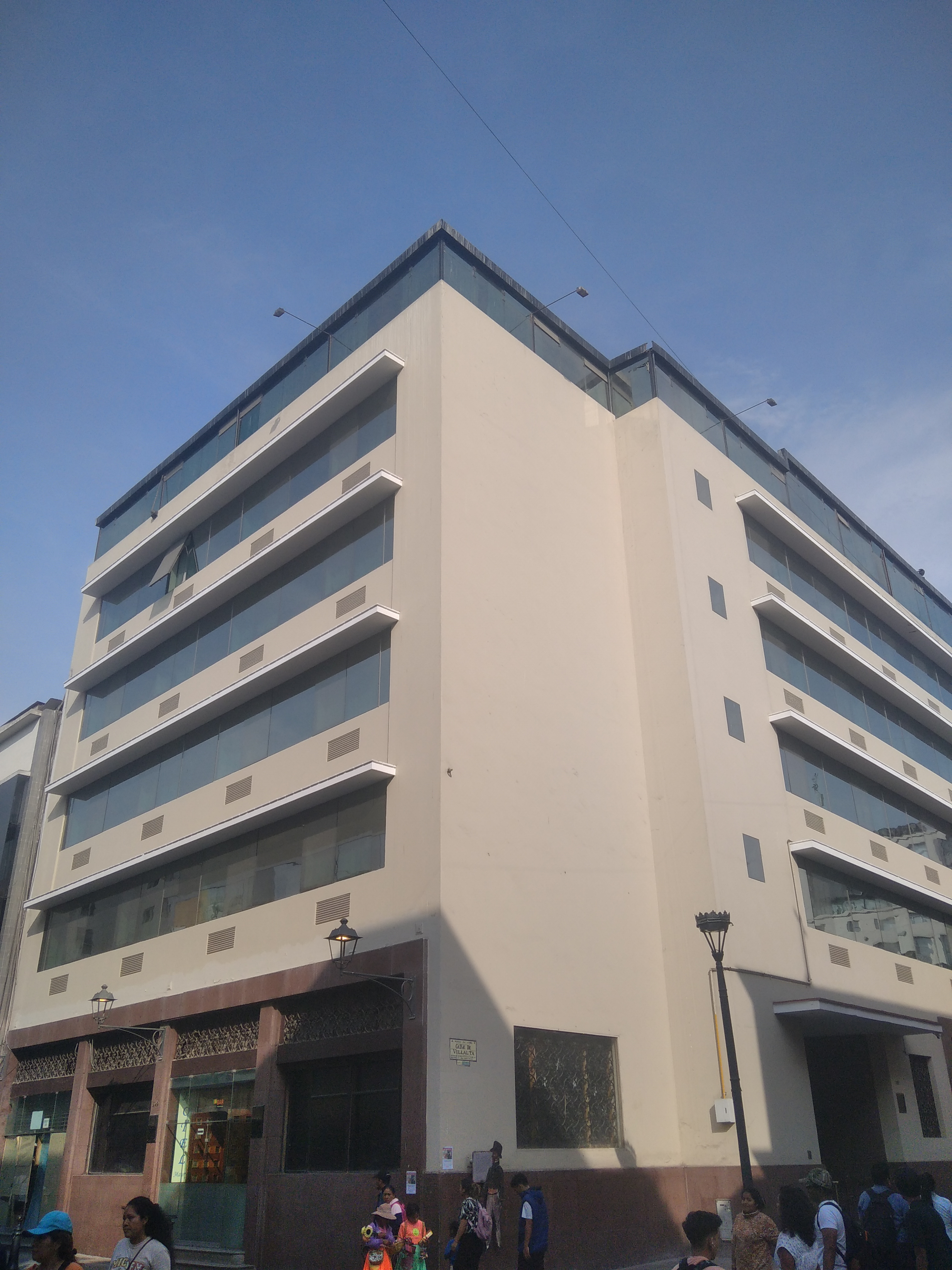
- Interactive map of the Hotel Maury area

General information
- Location: Jr. Carabaya & Ucayali
- Coordinates: 12.04772325°S 77.03091165°W
- Inaugurated: 1835, 2000
- Renovated: 2000
- Demolished: 1954

The Hotel Maury is a three-star hotel located at the corners of Carabaya and Ucayali streets in the historic centre of Lima, Peru. It is considered one of the oldest hotels in both Peru and the Pacific coast.

== History ==
The hotel was inaugurated in 1835. Founded by the French merchant Pedro Maury, it was created as an inn for travelers passing through Lima. It is located in block 3 of Jirón Carabaya, one block from the capital's main square.

Thanks to the fact that its property passed into the hands of the Chilean named Lecaros, the hotel was not looted during the occupation of Lima by the army of that country, when Peru faced Chile in the War of the Pacific.

Its ownership was transferred to Antonio Bergna after its purchase. In 1954 the 45-room building was demolished and the reconstruction was carried out by local architect Héctor Velarde and the engineer Adolfo Carozzo. The new building has five storeys. It was later remodelled again and reopened in February 2000.

=== Bar and restaurant ===
The hotel's bar and restaurant were popular for their cuisine and service. The owners also owned the restaurant in the Park of the Exhibition, the Jardín del Camal, and the Ancón hotel.

The hotel bar became known for its pisco sour. The drink was invented in the Bar Morris (in the Calle Boza), but the recipe was improved in the bar of this hotel. Also in the original establishment, another pisco-based cocktail was created, the Ponche de los libertadores. It is, together with the Gran Hotel Bolívar and the Casa Tambo, part of the "Pisco Sour route in the Centre of Lima."

== See also ==
- Gran Hotel Bolívar
