= Jirón Cotabambas =

Street in Lima, Peru

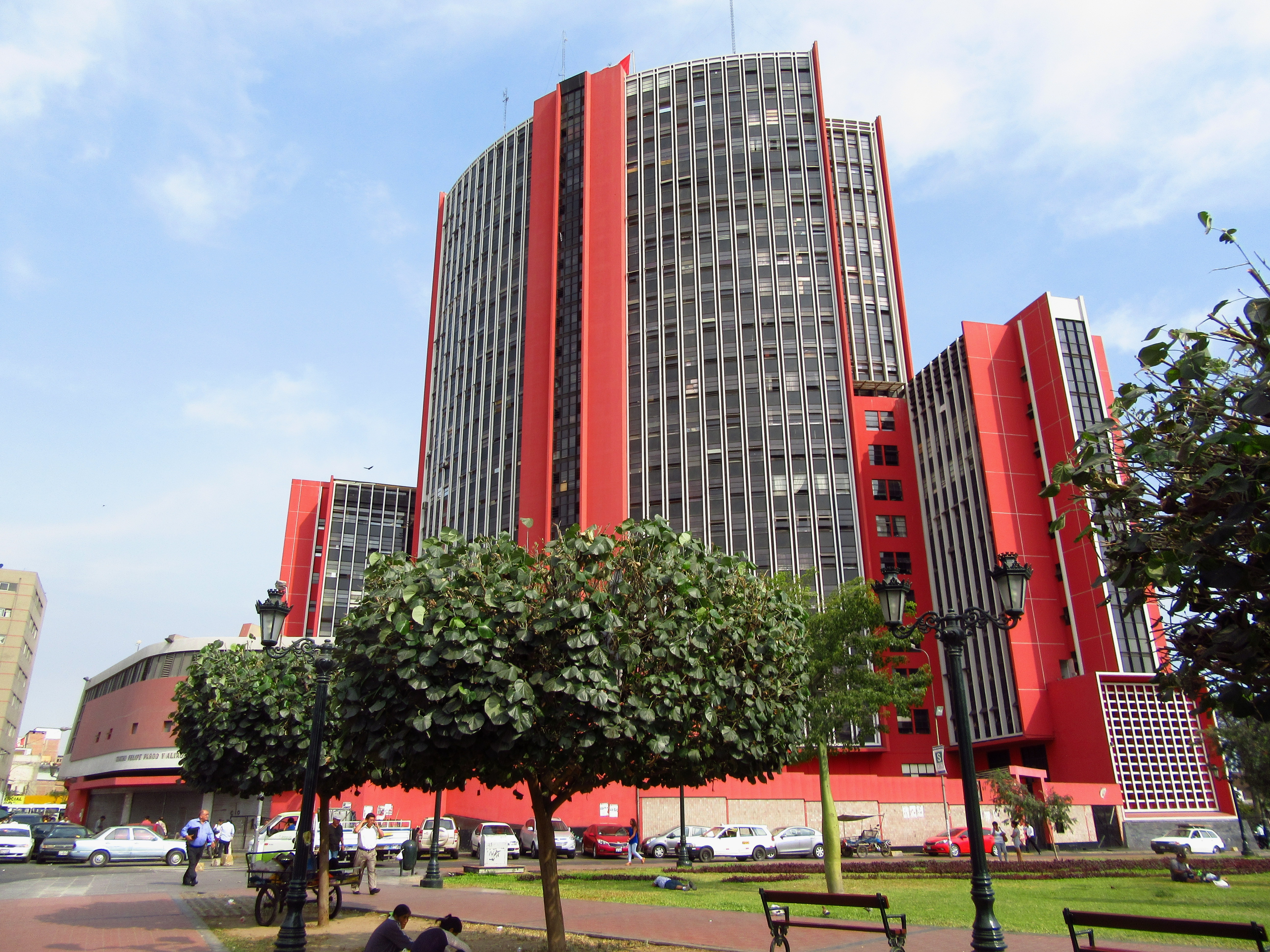
- View of the street and Alzamora building
- Part of: Damero de Pizarro
- Namesake: Cotabambas Province
- From: Jirón Apurímac
- Major junctions: La Colmena Avenue, Roosevelt Avenue
- To: Avenida Grau

Construction
- Completion: 1535

Jirón Cotabambas, formerly known as Jirón Independencia, is a street in the Damero de Pizarro, located in the historic centre of Lima, Peru. The street starts at its intersection with Jirón Apurímac, next to Javier Alzamora Valdez Building, and continues until it reaches Miguel Grau Avenue. It is best known for being the birthplace of the Club Alianza Lima.

== History ==
The street was the first location of the Sport Alianza soccer club, founded on 15 February 1901 by working-class youth in the Chacaritas neighbourhood of the city, later acquiring the Alianza Lima name in reference to the Alianza Racing Horse Stud, where their first matches were played.

== See also ==
- Historic Centre of Lima
