= Casa Goyeneche =

Historical building in Lima, Peru

Coordinates: 12°02′56″S 77°01′46″W

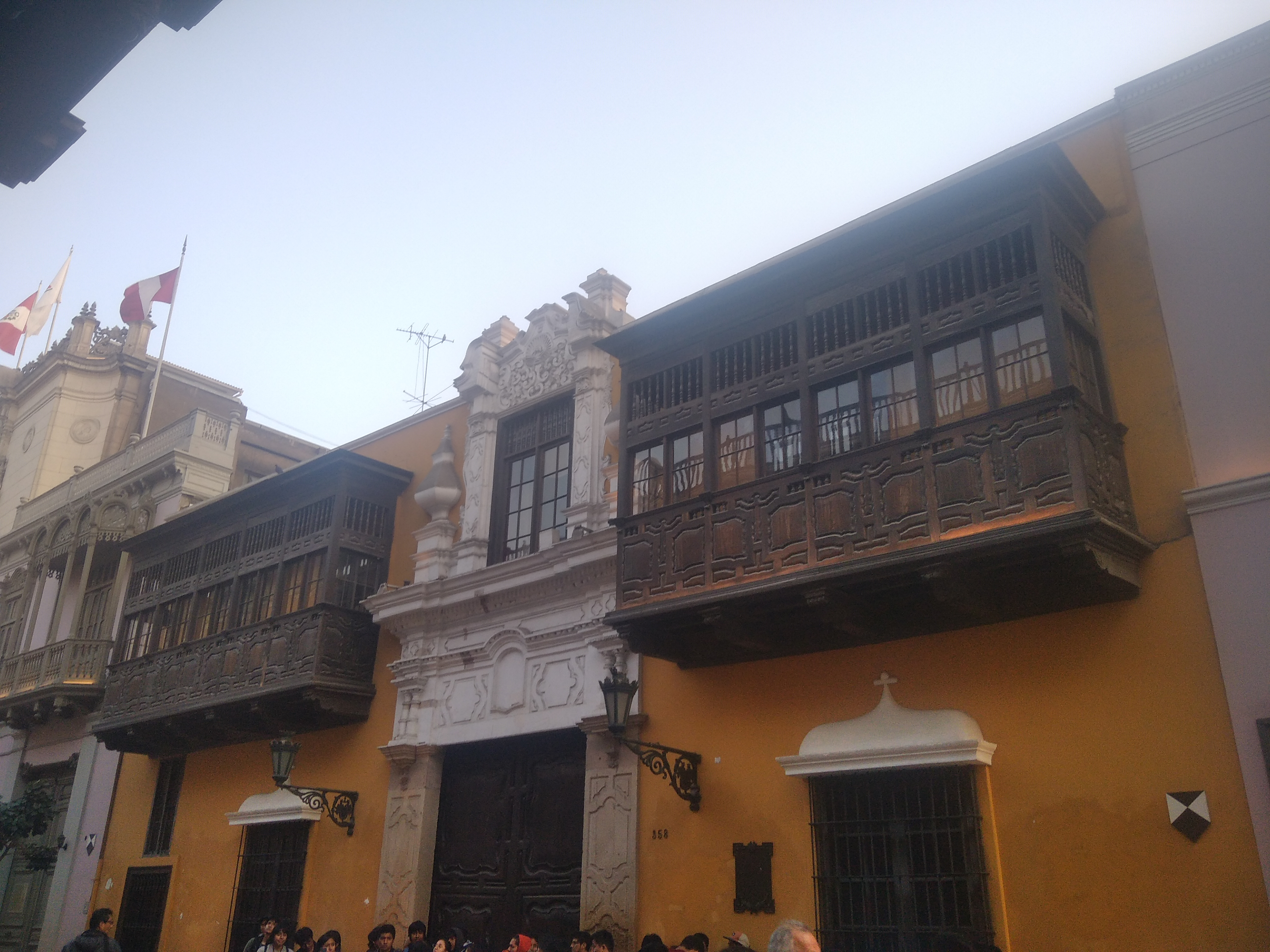

General information
- Architectural style: Spanish Colonial
- Address: Jirón Ucayali 358
- Year(s) built: 1771
- Owner: Banco de Crédito del Perú

Technical details
- Floor count: 2
- Floor area: 959.20 m^{2}

The Casa Goyeneche, also known as the Palacio de Goyeneche, the Casa Cavero or Casa Rada, is an 18th-century historical building located at Jirón Ucayali, part of the historic centre of Lima, Peru. The 959.20 m^{2} two-storey building is named after the family that formerly owned it.

== History ==
The house was built in 1771 for Ignacio Cavero y Vásquez de Acuña and his wife, Micaela de Tagle, on the Ucayali street in front of the Torre Tagle Palace. Later, the house was the residence of José Matías Vásquez de Acuña, VII count of Vega del Ren, and his descendants.

In 1859, after having been bequeathed by Archbishop José Manuel Pasquel to the Santo Toribio Seminary, its rector sold the house to Colonel Juan Mariano de Goyeneche y Barreda. It was remodeled in 1863 by architect Michele Trefogli under the Doric order.

In 1894, Goyeneche's children inherited the house and in 1914 the younger sister, María Josefa de Goyeneche, Duchess of Goyeneche, became the owner. In 1928, after the death of the Duchess of Goyeneche, the house was inherited by her second nephew Pablo A. Rada y Gamio, who in 1940 sold it to the banker Enrique Ayulo Pardo.

It was ultimately acquired by the Banco de Crédito del Perú in 1971.

== See also ==
- Peruvian colonial architecture
