= Jirón Ucayali =

Street in Lima, Peru

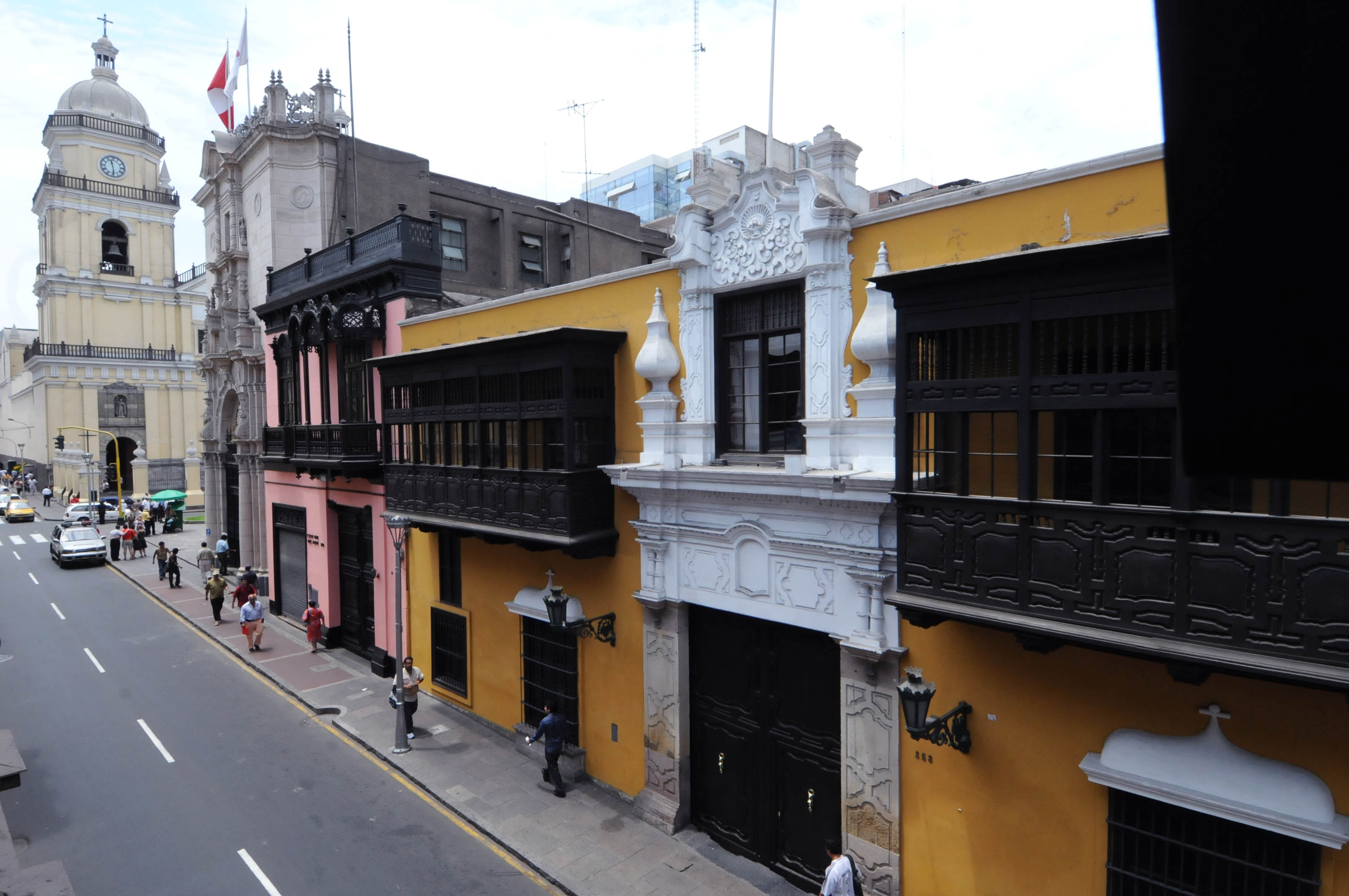
- View of the street's third block
- Interactive map of Jirón Ucayali
- Part of: Damero de Pizarro
- Namesake: Ucayali River
- From: Jirón de la Unión
- Major junctions: Jirón Carabaya, Jirón Lampa, Jirón Azángaro, Abancay Avenue, Jirón Ayacucho, Jirón Andahuaylas
- To: Jirón Paruro

Construction
- Completed: 1535

Ucayali Street (Spanish: Jirón Ucayali) (Note: simplified Chinese: 乌卡亚利街; traditional Chinese: 烏卡亞利街; pinyin: Wūkǎyǎlì jiē; lit. 'Wukayali Street') is a major street in the Damero de Pizarro, located in the historic centre of Lima, Peru. The street starts at its intersection with the Jirón de la Unión and continues until it reaches Jirón Paruro, in Barrios Altos. Its route extends to the west along Jirón Ica.

Its last block is known as Capón Street (Spanish: Calle Capón), (Note: Chinese: 卡彭街; pinyin: Kǎ péng jiē; lit. 'Kapeng Street') and is the location of the city's Chinatown. The street has numerous food businesses selling Asian products, chifas and tea rooms.

== Name ==
The street's name comes from the project that was ultimately adopted in 1862, which replaced the city's traditional names with names that reflected the country's political geography. The term jirón is a type of street, whose axis is formed from a variety of different, single-block streets. It is named after the Ucayali River.

== History ==
The then-unnamed multi-street axis was laid by Francisco Pizarro when he founded the city of Lima on January 18, 1535. In 1862, the city adopted the naming project of Mariano Bolognesi, an idea first proposed by Manuel Atanasio Fuentes in 1857. This new street was named after Ucayali River.

The traditional Calle de Plateros de San Pedro (its current first block) was known in 1613 as the street of the silversmiths (plateros) that led to San Agustín. Its function was mandated by Viceroy Francisco de Toledo, who ordered that the aforementioned smiths who worked with gold and silver had to have their workshops and stores together.

The traditional Calle de Villalta (its current second block) was known in 1613 as the "block that follows that of De la Coca and returns to the right, where licenciado Blas Altamirano lives". During the early 17th century, two schools existed on the street, operated by Antonio Rodríguez de Vitoria and Marcos Picón, respectively. The street took its final name after oidor José Antonio de Villalta y Núñez de Rojas, who lived at its corner with Banco del Herrador.

The traditional Calle de San Pedro (its current third block) was named after the convent of the same name. In 1613, it was known as the block that begins after the cross of the church of the Society of Jesus, where Grimanesa de Mogrovejo lived. Mogrovejo was the sister of Toribio Alfonso, Archbishop of Lima from 1579 until his death. Other inhabitants of the street included government secretary Antonio de Nájera and Jusepe de Altamirano, horse groom for the Viceroy Marquis of Montesclaros. It took its first name from Francisco de la Presa, who lived there. Other names include that of "the Company [of Jesus]" (its longest enduring name) and "Campana" (a name that appears in the 1787 map commissioned by Jorge Escobedo y Alarcón and likely being a mistake due to its similarity to the former), and other names relate it to the nearby silversmiths and the retreat house of San Pedro.

The traditional Calle de Estudios (its current fourth block) was known in 1613 as the street of the Society of Jesus that ends at the corner of their church. It was also known as the Calle del Nombre de Jesús for the same reason. During the 20th century, it was named after Peruvian historian Ricardo Palma, who served as director and restorer of the National Library of Peru located in the street's College of Saint Paul.

The traditional Calle de Zavala (its current fifth block) was named after the noble family of the same name. In 1613, it was known as the "block behind the Convento de la Concepción that goes up to the Molino de los Teatinos, a mill owned by the Jesuits.

The traditional Calle de Capón Primera (its current sixth block) was known in 1613 as the street where Cristóbal de Matos's enclosure was located. He was a descendant of Luis de Matos, who was granted the terrain by the cabildo in 1549. According to Luis A. Eguiguren, Manuel Loaysa and María de los Reyes—a married couple acquainted with Micaela Villegas's brother José—started selling capons and swine on the street in 1791. Originally one street, it was divided into two in 1911 under the government of Guillermo Billinghurst.

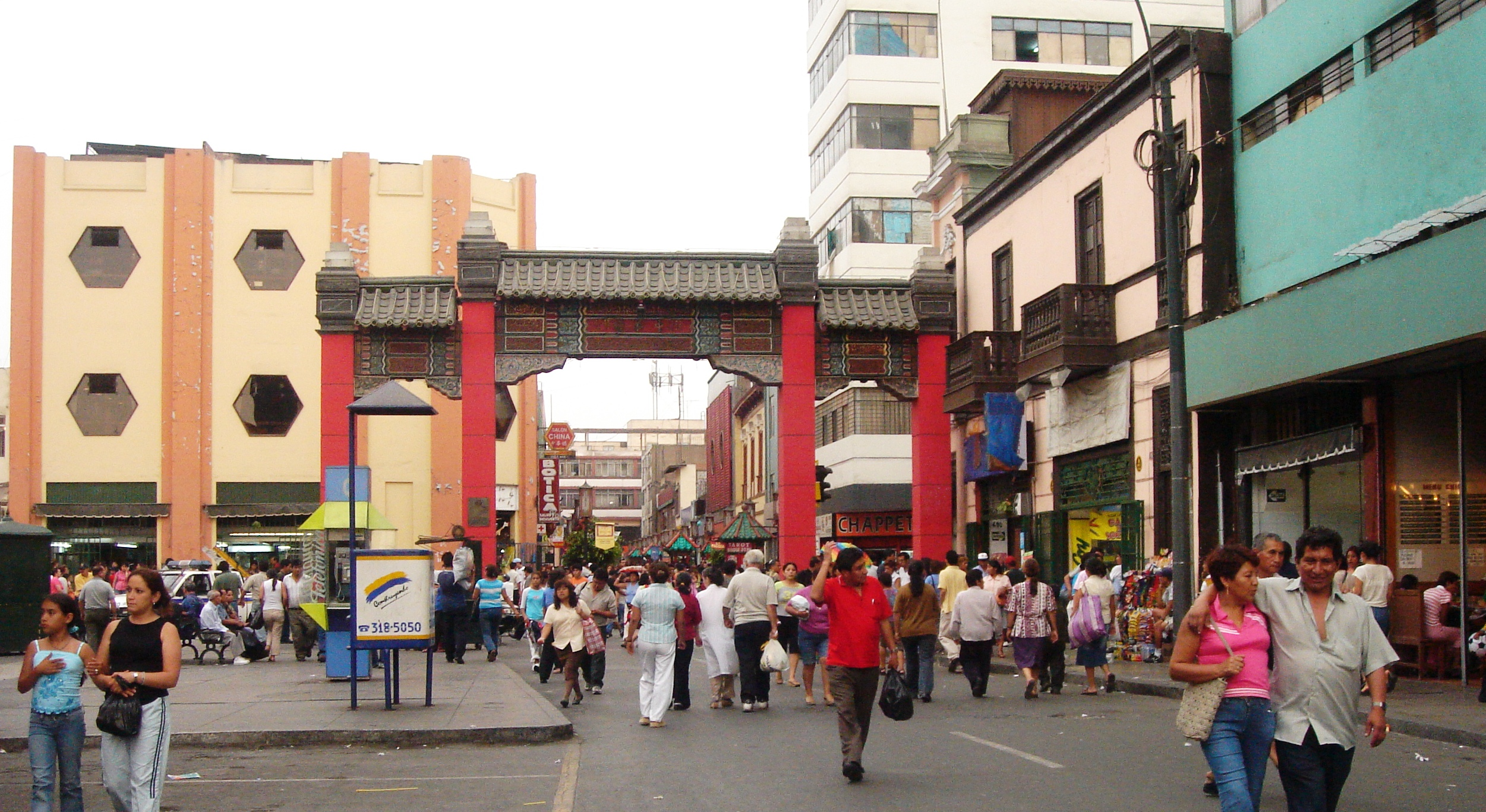
Arch at the entrance of Chinatown.

The traditional Calle de Capón Segunda (its current seventh block), now simply known as Capón Street (Spanish: Calle Capón) took its name from the former. In 1613, it was known as the block of the Molino de los Teatinos. Alonso Rodríguez, a hat manufacturer, also resided in the street. In Escobedo's map, it was known as the Calle de Anticona, a name later used by the street to its left side.

=== Recent history ===
Capón Street, previously a vehicular road, was made into a pedestrian footpath during the late 20th century. The newly remodelled street was inaugurated in 1999.

On January 13, 2024, a code-3 (out of control) fire consumed a 102-year old building near the street's corner with Abancay Avenue, affecting 16 families.

== Route ==
The street begins at its intersection with Union Street. This first block is connected to the main square by the Pasaje Olaya, a pedestrian alleyway. Located here are commercial buildings dating back to different periods of the 20th century. It continues until it reaches Carabaya Street.

The street's second block houses the Hotel Maury, an establishment dating back to 1835 and associated with the early history of the Pisco sour. To its front is the Casa Candamo, a two-storey house owned by the Arnao family until 1850, after which it was sold to the Candamo family. Manuel Candamo, its most famous resident, lived there until his death in 1904. Another important building is the Museum of the Central Reserve Bank of Peru, inaugurated in 1929 as the headquarters of the bank of the same name and later repurposed in 1982.

The street's third block is the site of the historical headquarters of the Banco de Crédito del Perú (BCP), originally the Banco Italiano. The exercise house of the Sacred Heart is located across the street. It was inaugurated in 1725, originally occupying the finca inherited by María Fernández de Córdova y Sande from her father, Lorenzo Fernández de Córdova y Sande, and the building next door (destroyed by the 1746 earthquake). Also located in the street is the Palacio de Goyeneche, a 959.20 m^{2} two-storey building that dates back to the 1760s–1770s once leased to the Seminario de Lima and auctioned two years later to Colonel Juan Mariano de Goyeneche y Barreda. It was remodeled in 1863 by architect Michele Trefogli under the Doric order. It was ultimately acquired by the BCP in 1971. Other important buildings are the Palacio de Torre Tagle, the Casa Aspíllaga (both operated by the Ministry of Foreign Affairs), the Casa L'eau Vive (a French restaurant operated by nuns), and the former Banco Industrial del Perú (operated by the Peruvian ombudsman), located next to the Plazuela de San Pedro.

The street's fourth block houses the Basilica and Convent of Saint Peter, a Jesuit religious complex dating back to 1638 whose interior houses the remains of two Viceroys of Peru: the Marquess of Osorno and the Count of Lemos. Opposite the church is the Grand Public Library of Lima, one of two branches operated by the National Library of Peru. This block is the last to be located to the west of Avenida Abancay.

The street's fifth and sixth blocks are located in Barrios Altos. They feature commercial establishments and a number of buildings from multiple time periods. The latter of the two houses the Central Market of Lima at its northern side, itself located next to the Chinese Arch at the entrance of the city's Chinatown.

Calle Capón, the street's seventh block, begins past the arch. It is the best known feature of Lima's Chinatown, and feature Chinese-oriented businesses, including Chifa restaurants. It concludes at its intersection with Paruro Street.

== Transportation ==
The road is accessible to regular traffic, while certain areas are restricted to pedestrian use, such as Capón Street.

== See also ==
- Historic Centre of Lima
