= Roosevelt Avenue, Lima =

Avenue in Lima, Peru

Franklin D. Roosevelt Avenue
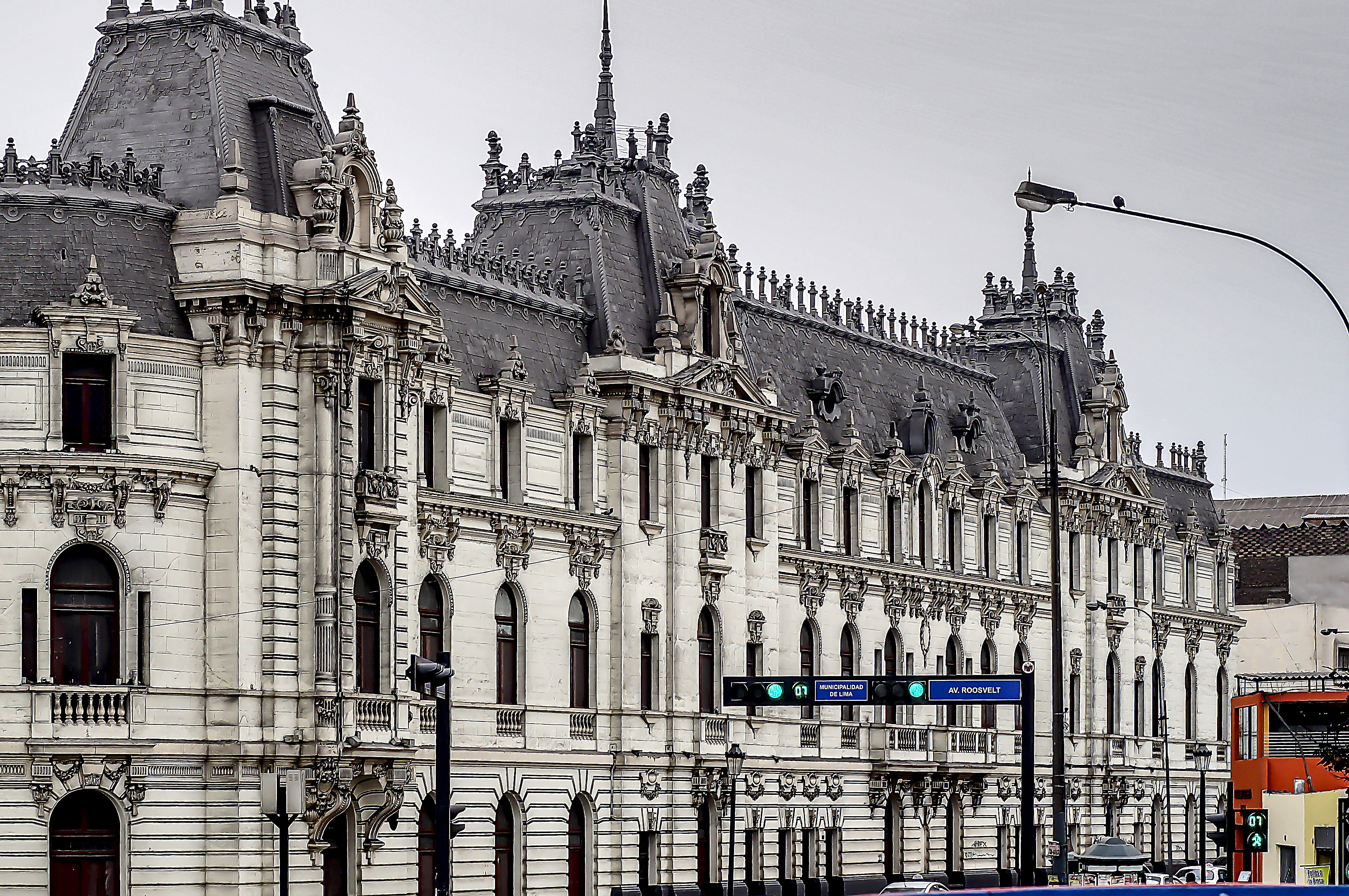
- View of the avenue and the Edificio Rímac
- Part of: Historic Centre of Lima
- Namesake: Franklin D. Roosevelt
- From: Paseo de la República
- Major junctions: See list: Jirón de la Unión; Jirón Carabaya; Jirón Lampa; Jirón Azángaro; Jirón Bambas
- To: Jirón Cotabambas

Construction
- Completion: 1945

Franklin D. Roosevelt Avenue (Spanish: Avenida Franklin D. Roosevelt), also known simply as Roosevelt Avenue (Spanish: Avenida Roosevelt), is an avenue of the historic centre of Lima, Peru. It starts at the Paseo de la República, continuing the path of Bolivia Avenue, and continues until it reaches Cotabambas Street, one block away from the public park of the National University of San Marcos.

== Name ==
The avenue is named since July 1945 after Franklin D. Roosevelt, president of the United States from 1933 until his death earlier that year.

== History ==
The avenue dates back to before the 17th century, as a single street (now its first block) known as Sirena after a restaurant known by the same name due its distinctive figure. In 1858, this street intersected on its eastern side with the railroad connecting Lima with the seaside resort of Chorrillos.

Peruvian historian Luis A. Eguiguren claims that during the Spanish era, there was a well-known prostitute known as "the Serpent" (Spanish: La culebra), who would let male passers-by know when they had caught her attention. He also claims that another name that the street once had was "Five Corners" (Spanish: Cinco Esquinas) (Note: Not to be confused with the area of the same name in Barrios Altos.) after the five corners formed by the intersection of Sirena, Calonge and Cascajal streets.

=== Recent history ===
From 1919 to 1924, the Rímac Building (also called the Casa Roosevelt after the avenue) was built on the first block of the avenue, designed by Polish-Peruvian architect Ricardo de Jaxa Malachowski in line with the construction boom promoted by then president Augusto B. Leguía for the insurance company of the same name.

The street's traditional name of Sirena survived until 1945, when the Paseo de la República and Bolivia avenues were formed and extended respectively, and the avenue—now named after the U.S. President—was formally inaugurated by Councilor José Max Arnillas Arana, who gave a speech at the inauguration ceremony on behalf of the Provincial Council of Lima.

During the 2023 Peruvian protests, the avenue was one of many locations where protestors marched through the streets, with rioting and arrests taking place there.

== Route ==
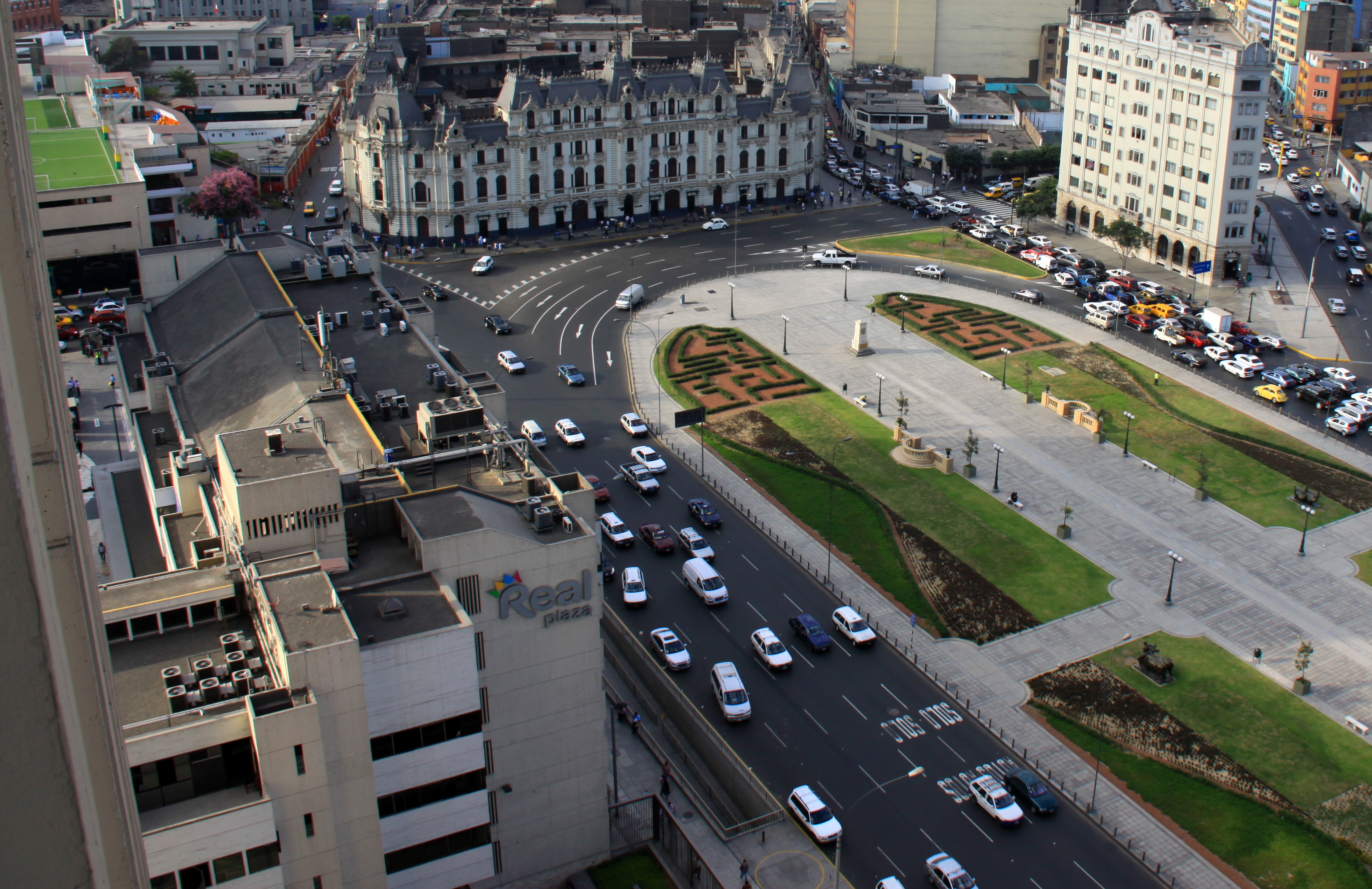
View from the Sheraton Hotel.

The avenue starts at the northern side of the Paseo de los Héroes Navales, where Paseo de la República Avenue and Union Street begin. It is continued to the west by Bolivia Avenue. Its northern side is prominently occupied by the Edificio Rímac since 1924.

The Edificio República is located on the southern side of its section between Carabaya and Lampa streets. Built during the 1940s, it was the first building of its kind to be built in Lima. When it first opened, its first floor was occupied by shops, the second to fifth floor by offices, and the final three floors by apartments. Its air conditioning system was manufactured by Carrier Corporation and installed by Pedro Martinto, S.A. Until 1974, it housed the embassy of the United Kingdom on its fifth floor. A plaque commemorating the avenue is located on its lobby.

The avenue's next blocks are occupied by commercial establishments, such as shopping centres and small businesses. The private residences at its intersection with Azángaro Street were demolished from 2024 to 2025 to make way for Qantua Centro Capital, a mixed housing and commercial development that began in January 2025.

== Transportation ==
The avenue allows for regular vehicular transit in its entirety. It is also serviced by the Metropolitano bus system's Central Station, located immediately next to its point of origin. The service also operates its Route E since January 2023, which intersects with the avenue.

== See also ==
- Historic Centre of Lima
- Lima District
