= Palace of Justice, Lima =

Seat of the Supreme Court of Peru, located in capital Lima

Coordinates: 12°03′27″S 77°02′06″W

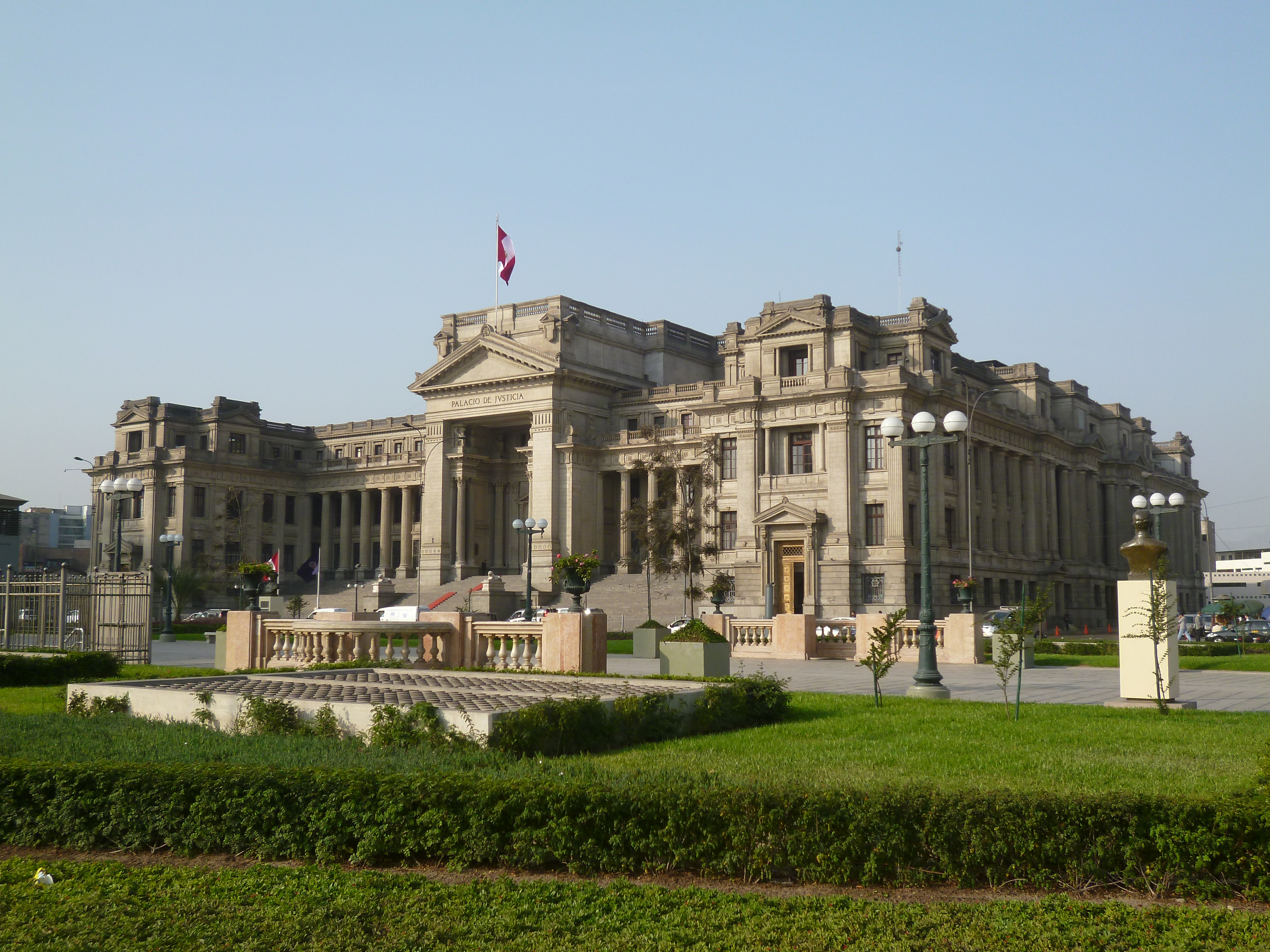
Palace of Justice

The Palace of Justice (Spanish: Palacio de Justicia) is the seat of the Supreme Court of Peru. It is located in front of the Paseo de los Héroes Navales, in the Lima District of the city of Lima, capital of Peru. Construction started during the second government of Augusto B. Leguía (1919–1930) and finished under the presidency of Óscar R. Benavides, who inaugurated the building in the late 1930s. The Palace was built in a neoclassical style as its plans were based on those of the Law Courts of Brussels, Belgium, work of Joseph Poelaert. However, it is much smaller and lacks the dome of its Belgian counterpart.
