= Jirón Apurímac =

Street in Lima, Peru

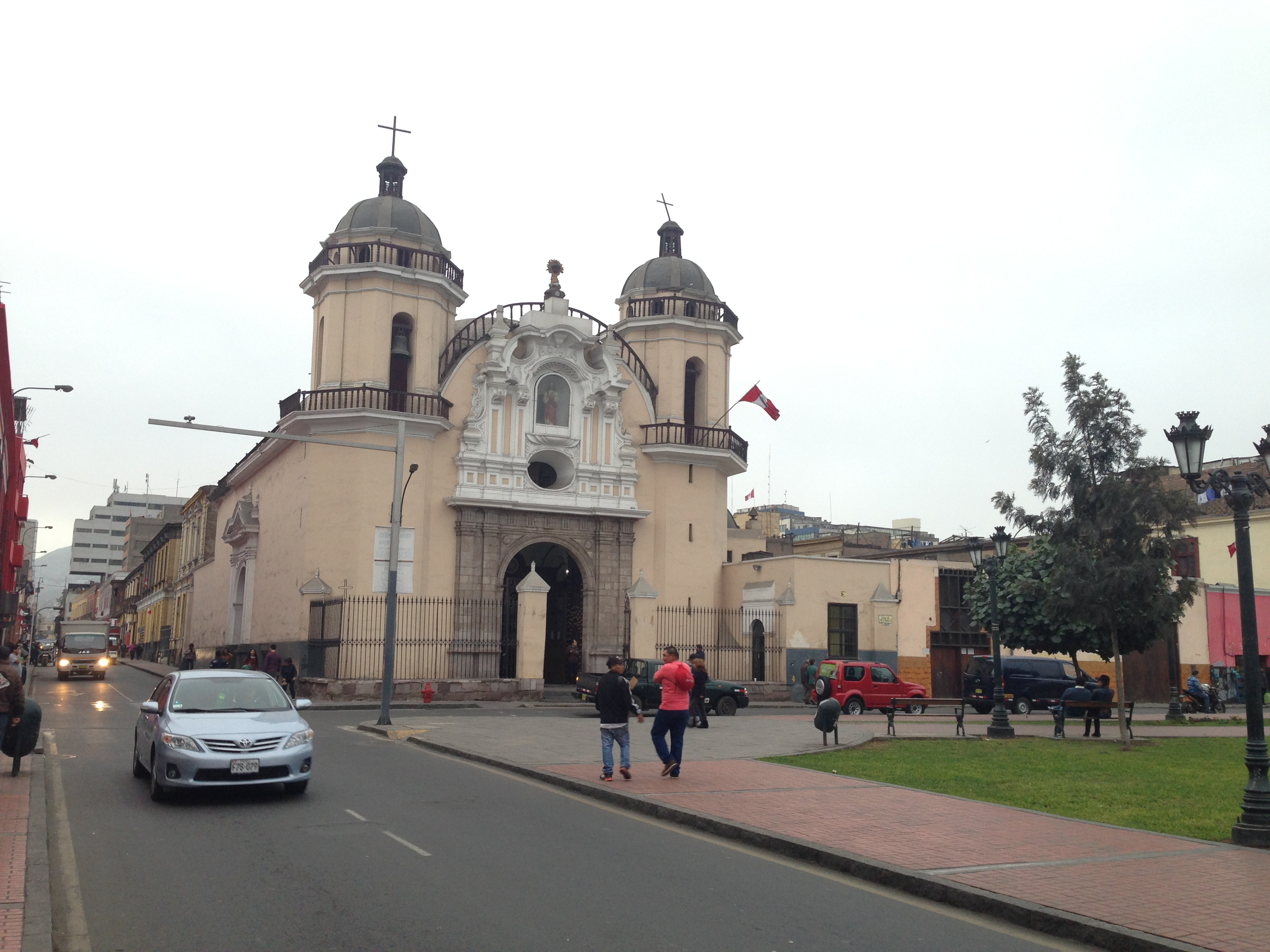
- The street as seen from Jr. Azángaro
- Part of: Damero de Pizarro
- Namesake: Department of Apurímac
- From: Avenida Abancay
- Major junctions: Jirón Lampa, Jirón Azángaro
- To: Jirón Carabaya

Construction
- Completion: 1535

Jirón Apurímac is a street in the Damero de Pizarro, located in the historic centre of Lima, Peru. The street starts at its intersection with Abancay Avenue, behind the Javier Alzamora Valdez Building, and continues until it reaches Jirón Carabaya.

== History ==
The road that today constitutes the street was laid by Francisco Pizarro when he founded the city of Lima on January 18, 1535. In 1862, when a new urban nomenclature was adopted, the road was named jirón Apurímac, after the department of Apurímac. Prior to this renaming, each block (cuadra) had a unique name:

- Block 1: San Cristóbal, after a church of the same name that was destroyed in the earthquake of 1746. It is currently the Portal Pumacahua, also known as the Portal San Martín and is no longer part of the street but part of San Martín Square.
- Block 2: Cueva, after Alfonso de la Cueva y Ponce de León, who lived there.
- Block 3: Corazón de Jesús, after the church of the same name, the first church built with that dedication.
- Block 4: Chacarilla, where the College of Our Lady of Guadalupe was originally founded.

The street, in its intersection with the Jirón Azángaro, is the location of the Iglesia de los Huérfanos.

== See also ==
- Historic Centre of Lima
