= Paseo de la República Avenue =

Avenue in Lima, Peru

Luis Fernán Bedoya Reyes Expressway
- El Zanjón
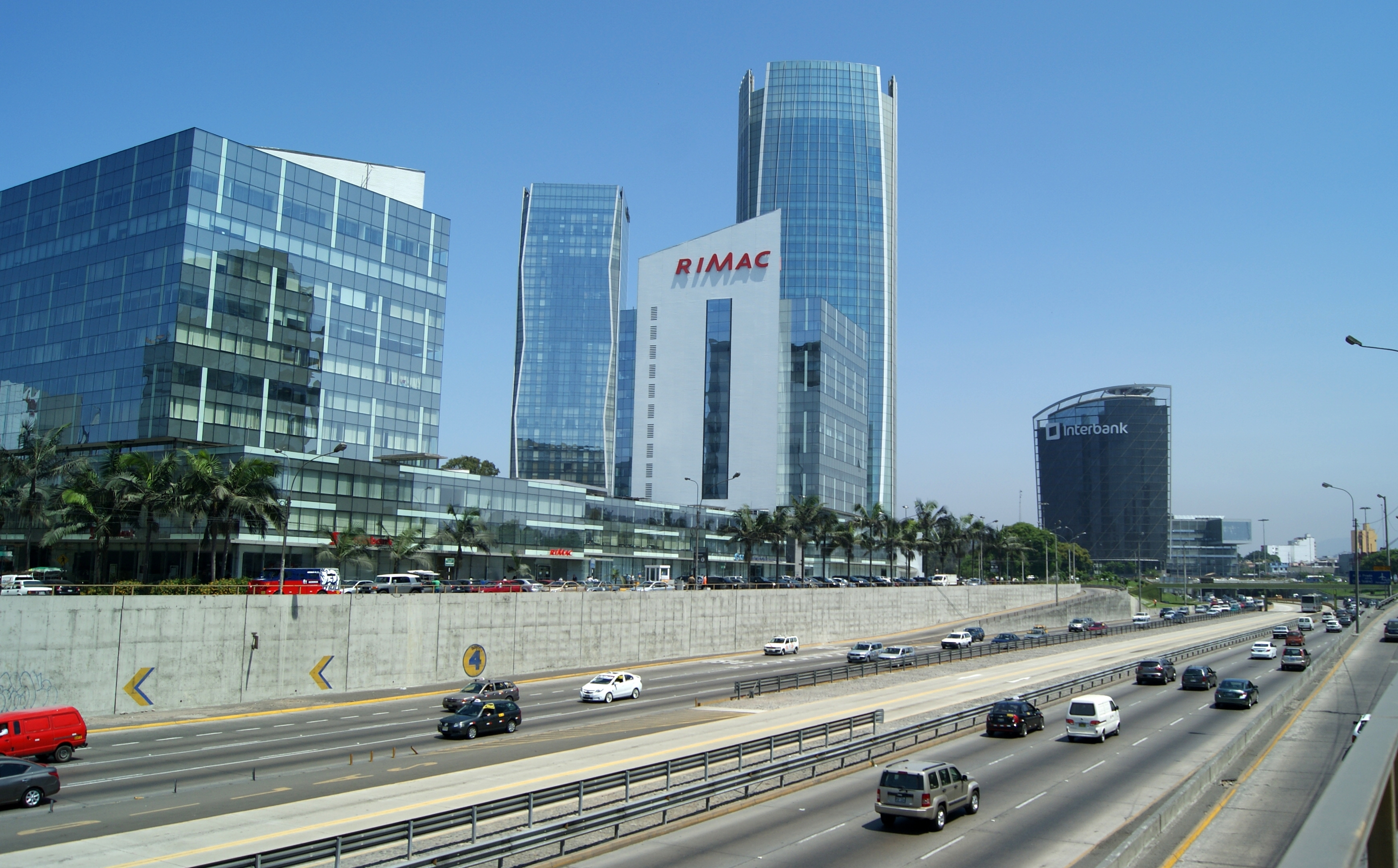
- Interactive map of Luis Fernán Bedoya Reyes Expressway
- Former name: Paseo de la República Avenue
- From: Union and Carabaya streets
- Major junctions: See list: Bolivia Avenue; Roosevelt Avenue; Jirón Lampa; Spain Avenue; Miguel Grau Avenue; 9 December Avenue; 28 July Avenue; Javier Prado Avenue; Angamos Avenue; Alfredo Benavides Avenue
- To: Panama Avenue

Luis Fernán Bedoya Reyes Expressway (Spanish: Vía Expresa Luis Fernán Bedoya Reyes), also known as Paseo de la República Avenue (Spanish: Avenida Paseo de la República) (Note: Official name prior to 2019.) or as El Zanjón, (Note: The nickname alludes to the fact that the road's construction formed a large trench (zanjón) throughout the city.) is the most representative avenue of Lima, Peru. It crosses the districts of Lima, La Victoria, Lince, San Isidro, Surquillo, Miraflores, Barranco and Chorrillos from north to south along 66 blocks. COSAC I of the Metropolitano extends along its entire length, being one of the widest avenues in the city and country.

The avenue begins at the Edificio Rímac, located in the historic centre of Lima, and ends in Barranco District.

== History ==
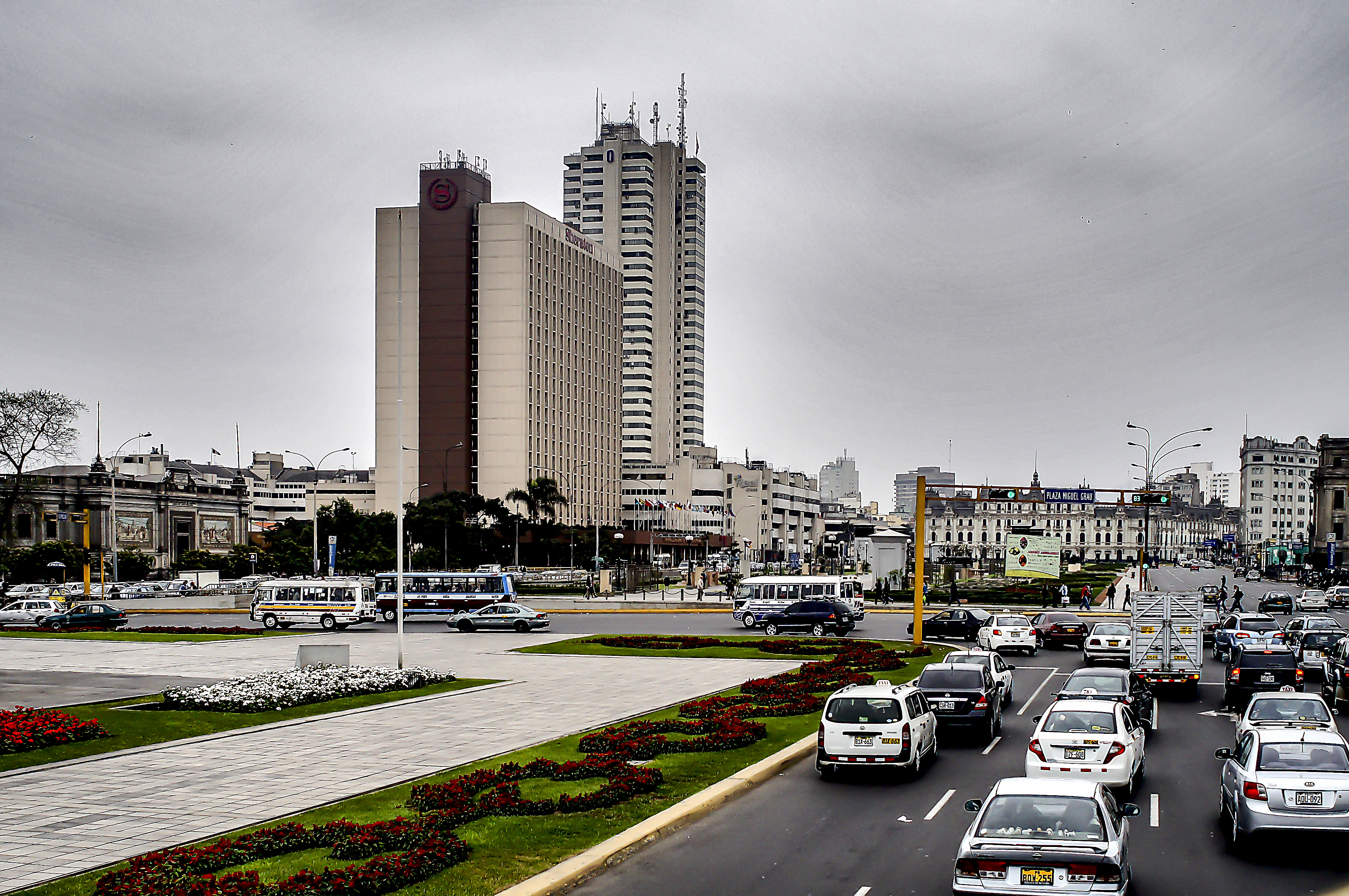
The avenue begins in the city's centre.

Prior to the avenue's construction, an Inca road passed through its route, continued to the north by what is currently Túpac Amaru Avenue.

In 1858, President Ramón Castilla ordered the laying of a railway line that would link Lima with the balneario of Chorrillos, one of the favorites of Lima's high society during the 19th century. Then, in 1868 when President José Balta ordered the demolition of the city walls, the railway line served as a pattern for the laying of a road. With the construction of the Parque de la Exposición, next to this road, the construction of the avenue that would take the name of Paseo de la República was arranged.

The Paseo de la República was, at the time, the widest avenue in the city of Lima and served as a framework for the projection of the working-class neighborhood of La Victoria that José Balta himself built. Subsequently, as a result of the conurbation process that the city experienced during the first decades of the 20th century, the Paseo de la República was uniting successive districts.

In 2022, the restoration of the mural created by the artist Ricardo Wiesse between 1990 and 1991 was inaugurated.

=== First and second stage ===
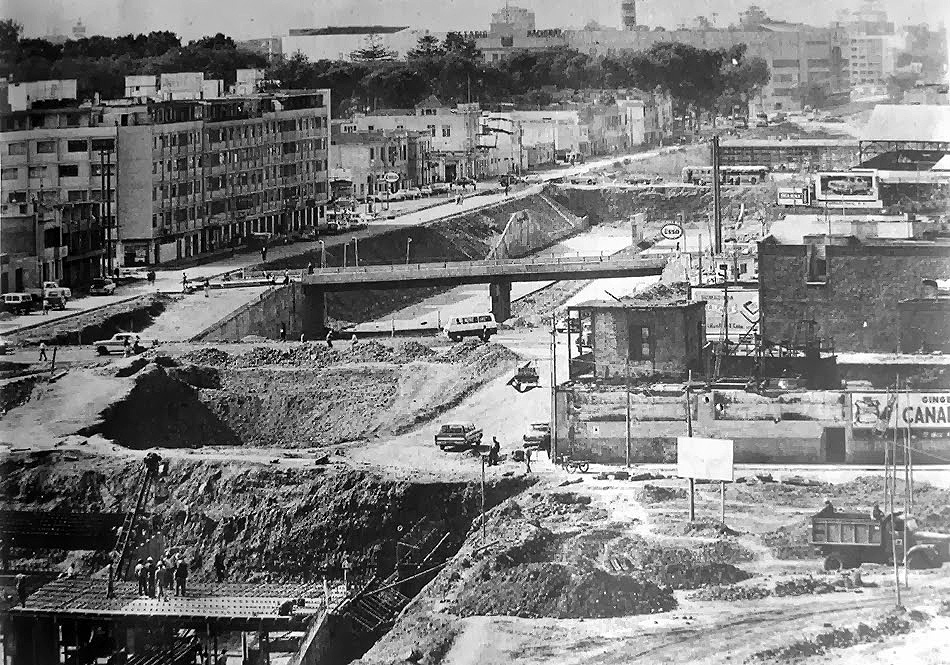
Construction in 1967.

In 1966, then mayor of Lima Luis Bedoya Reyes began the construction of the expressway, an idea by Benjamin Doig. This express road contemplated the construction of an uneven highway (a large "ditch", or zanja in Spanish, for what the members of the Aprista party pejoratively called a zanjón at the beginning due to its poor functionality due to the low number of vehicles, and which later remained as colloquial use) and it is the first express way of the country. However, its level is irregular, so there are areas (such as the one adjacent to the National Stadium where it is at the same height from the ground. Around 1968, the construction of the first stage that included from Plaza Grau to the Av. Javier Prado, ending shortly after where Av. Enrique Canaval y Moreyra is currently. In 1969, the construction of the second stage began and included the remaining section towards the district of Barranco.

During the 1980s, gardens were added to the slopes of the Vía Expresa, which are used as advertising panels through the use of plants and flowers of different colors. Likewise, mosaic-based murals were made, some of which still remain. At one of the exits from the intersection with Av. Javier Prado, there was a mural by the Peruvian artist Fernando de Szyszlo, destroyed in 1999 during the construction of the Interbank Building.

In 2006, the municipality of Lima began the implementation of a bus rapid transit system called the Metropolitano. In 2007, constructions were carried out for 10 months for the new bus stops in the southern corridor. There are 12 stations of this service on the Vía Expresa. This section of the Metropolitano was inaugurated on July 28, 2010.

=== Third stage ===
A third stage through which the Vía Expresa and the avenue itself extended to the San Juan de Miraflores district was planned, but the city's conurbation process truncated the realization of that project, in addition to the fact that this projected route had to cross the area of the Las Palmas Air Base of the Peruvian Air Force located in Santiago de Surco. The project was restarted in 2019.

== See also ==
- Costa Verde (Peru)
