= Basilica and Convent of San Pedro, Lima =

Church in Lima, Peru

Coordinates: 12°02′43.79″S 77°01′38.62″W

Basilica and Convent of Saint Peter
- Basílica y convento de San Pedro
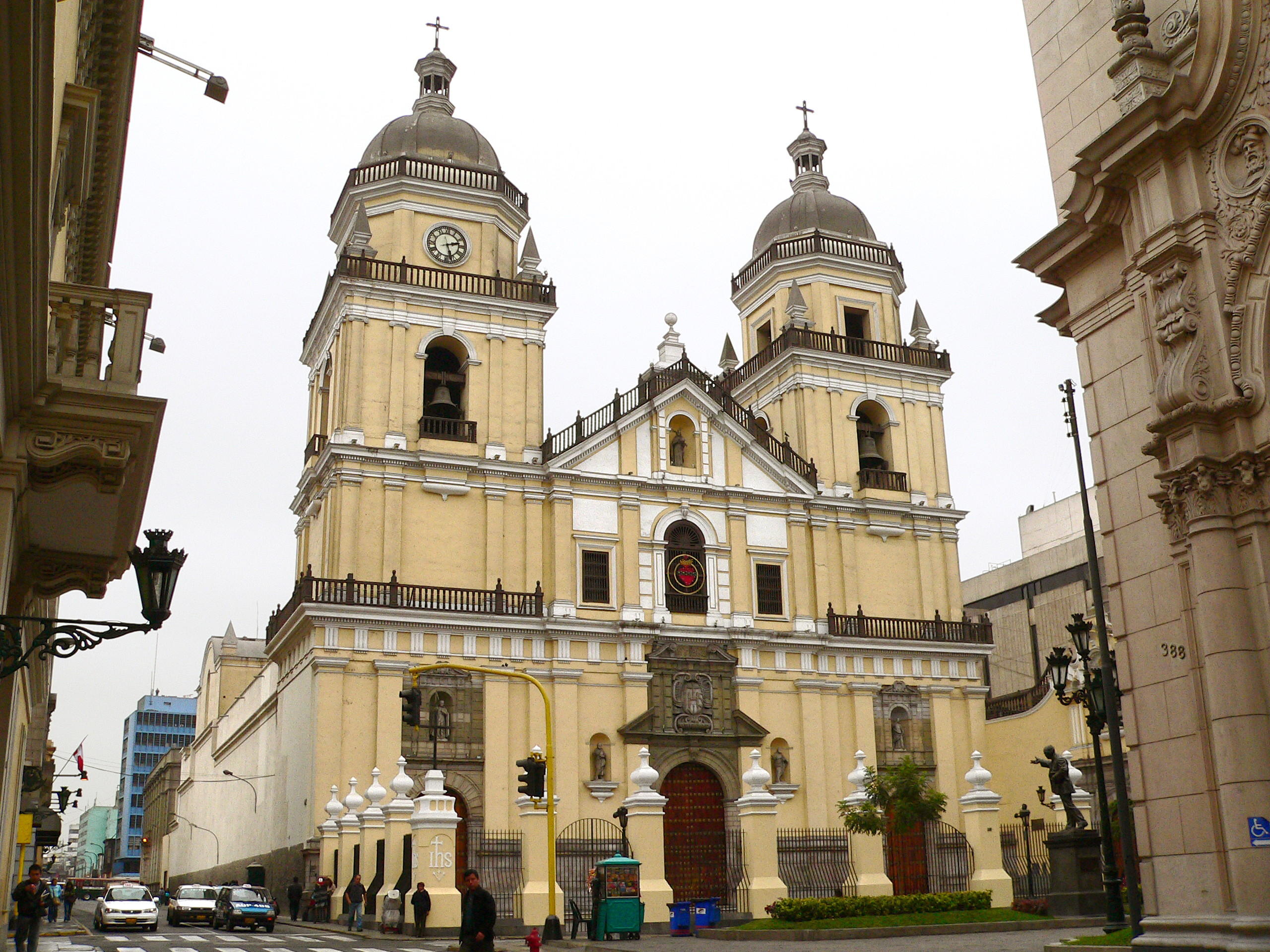
- The church in 2007

Religion
- Affiliation: Catholic
- Governing body: Archdiocese of Lima

Location
- Location: Jr. Azángaro & Ucayali, Lima
- Interactive map of Basilica and Convent of Saint Peter

Architecture
- Style: Neocolonial, Neoclassical
- Completed: 1638

The Basilica and Convent of Saint Peter (Spanish: Basílica y convento de San Pedro), formerly known as Basilica of Saint Paul (Spanish: Basílica de San Pablo de Lima) after the school of the same name, is a Catholic church located in the historic centre of Lima, Peru.

== History ==
Completed in 1638 as part of the former College of Saint Paul (Spanish: Colegio Máximo de San Pablo de Lima), it is administered by the Jesuits and it was created Basilica as part of the Archdiocese of Lima. In this church, Sacred Heart of Jesus is venerated.

Among those interred within the church is the Viceroy of Peru (1796-1801) Ambrosio O'Higgins. The heart of Pedro Antonio Fernández de Castro, 10th Count of Lemos, also a Viceroy of Peru (1667-1672), is located inside the church. It was originally located at the Church of Our Lady of the Forsaken (demolished in 1937), which was the Count's favourite, as he would be commonly seen sweeping the street outside the church with a broom despite his office.

On 16 March 2018 the basilica hosted the royal wedding of Prince Christian of Hanover to Alessandra de Osma.

== See also ==
- Historic Centre of Lima
- Francis Borgia
