= Jirón Carabaya =

Street in Lima, Peru

- Jirón Augusto Wiese
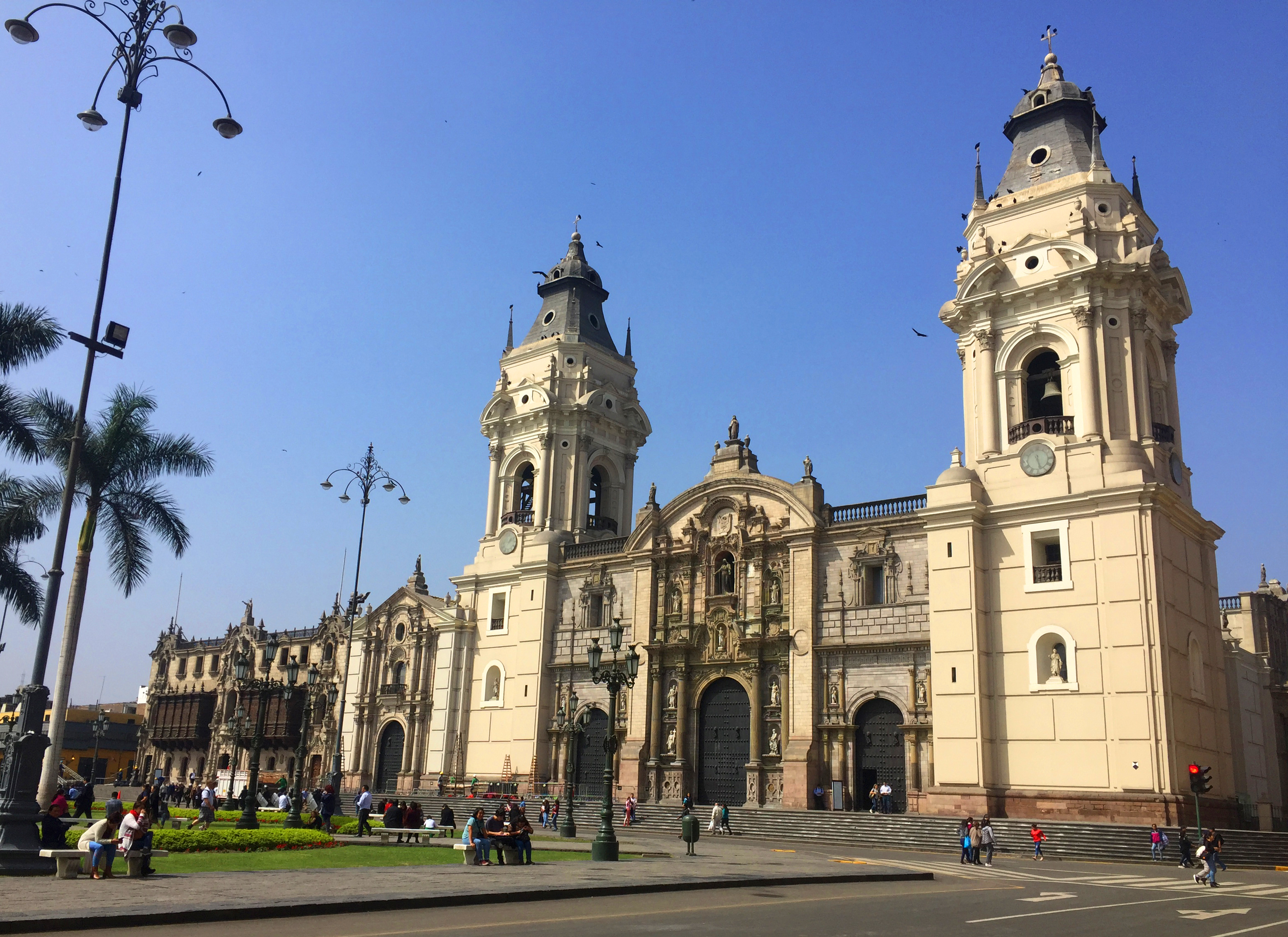
- The Archbishop's Palace and the Cathedral in the street, seen from the Plaza Mayor
- Interactive map of Jirón Carabaya
- Part of: Damero de Pizarro
- Namesake: Carabaya Province
- From: Jirón Áncash
- Major junctions: See list: Jirón Junín; Jirón Huallaga; Jirón Ucayali; Jirón Santa Rosa; Jirón Cuzco; Jirón Puno; Jirón Apurímac; Nicolás de Piérola Avenue; Jirón Lino Cornejo; Jirón Pachitea; Franklin D. Roosevelt Avenue
- To: Paseo de la República

Construction
- Completed: 1535

Carabaya Street (Spanish: Jirón Carabaya) is a major street in the Damero de Pizarro, an area of the historic centre of Lima, Peru. The street starts at its intersection with the Jirón Áncash, and ends at Paseo de la República Avenue.

It runs parallel to Union Street and similarly connects the Plaza Mayor with the Plaza San Martín, ending at the Paseo de los Héroes Navales.

== Name ==
The street's name comes from the project that was ultimately adopted in 1862, which replaced the city's traditional names with names that reflected the country's political geography. The term jirón is a type of street, whose axis is formed from a variety of different, single-block streets. It is named after Carabaya Province, although it also adopted the name Augusto Wiese Street (Spanish: Jirón Augusto Wiese) during the 20th century.

== History ==
In 1862, when a new urban nomenclature was adopted, the road was named jirón Carabaya, after Carabaya Province (it was later renamed during the 20th century, being named after philanthropist Augusto Wiese Eslava). Prior to this renaming, each block (cuadra) had a unique name:

- Block 1: Pescadería, after a fish market that was later demolished.
- Block 2: Gradas de la Catedral/Cruz de Gradas/Covachuelas, after the steps that lead to the Cathedral. Also at one point called Peligro by a foreigner.
- Block 3: Bodegones/de la Requena, the former name coming from the warehouses located in the street.
- Block 4: de Coca, after the family that lived there.
- Block 5: Filipinas/de Doña Leonor de Ampuero/Solisvango, named after a local branch of the Royal Company of the Philippines located in the street; the latter two were due to a woman and a family who resided there, respectively.
- Block 6: Divorciadas, after the divorced women that lived there in a building known as the Casa de Divorciadas.
- Block 7: Pando, after José Antonio de Pando y Riva.

In 1872, a large crowd took over the street, marching towards the Plaza Mayor in response to the attempted coup d'état. During its history, people such as Manuel Candamo, Ramón Castilla and Augusto B. Leguía purchased properties in the street, where they subsequently lived. The latter's property was looted after he was ousted in 1930, being later demolished in the 1960s. Castilla's residence, known as the Casa de Castilla, was in danger of being demolished in 1976, four years after it was declared part of the Cultural heritage of Peru.

Starting in the mid to late 19th century, the traditional architecture of the street became replaced in favour of French-inspired buildings. Under the government of Leguía, a return to traditional architecture started to manifest, taking influences from both Spanish (Colonial Revival) and Indian (Neo-Indigenist/Neo-Peruvian) architecture.

== Transportation ==
The street's first four blocks are restricted to pedestrian use only, while access to its second block is restricted to government officials or invitees in the same capacity.

=== Bus service ===
Between its fifth and sixth blocks, a station of the Metropolitano operates at the street's intersection with Cuzco Street since 2009, forming part of the bus service's Route C. Additionally, the service's Central Station is located under the Promenade of the Naval Heroes, which immediately follows the end of the avenue.

=== Train service ===
Desamparados station, located at the northern end of the street, operates a bi-annual service of the Ferrocarril Central Andino (FCA) during Holy Week and the National Holidays. In 2025, the announced an additional service, coinciding with the celebrations of the Battle of Junín.

As of July 2025, a project for a railway connecting Lima and Chosica is underway, involving Desamparados, as well as nearby Monserrate station.

== See also ==
- Historic Centre of Lima
